= Brage Prize =

Norwegian literary award

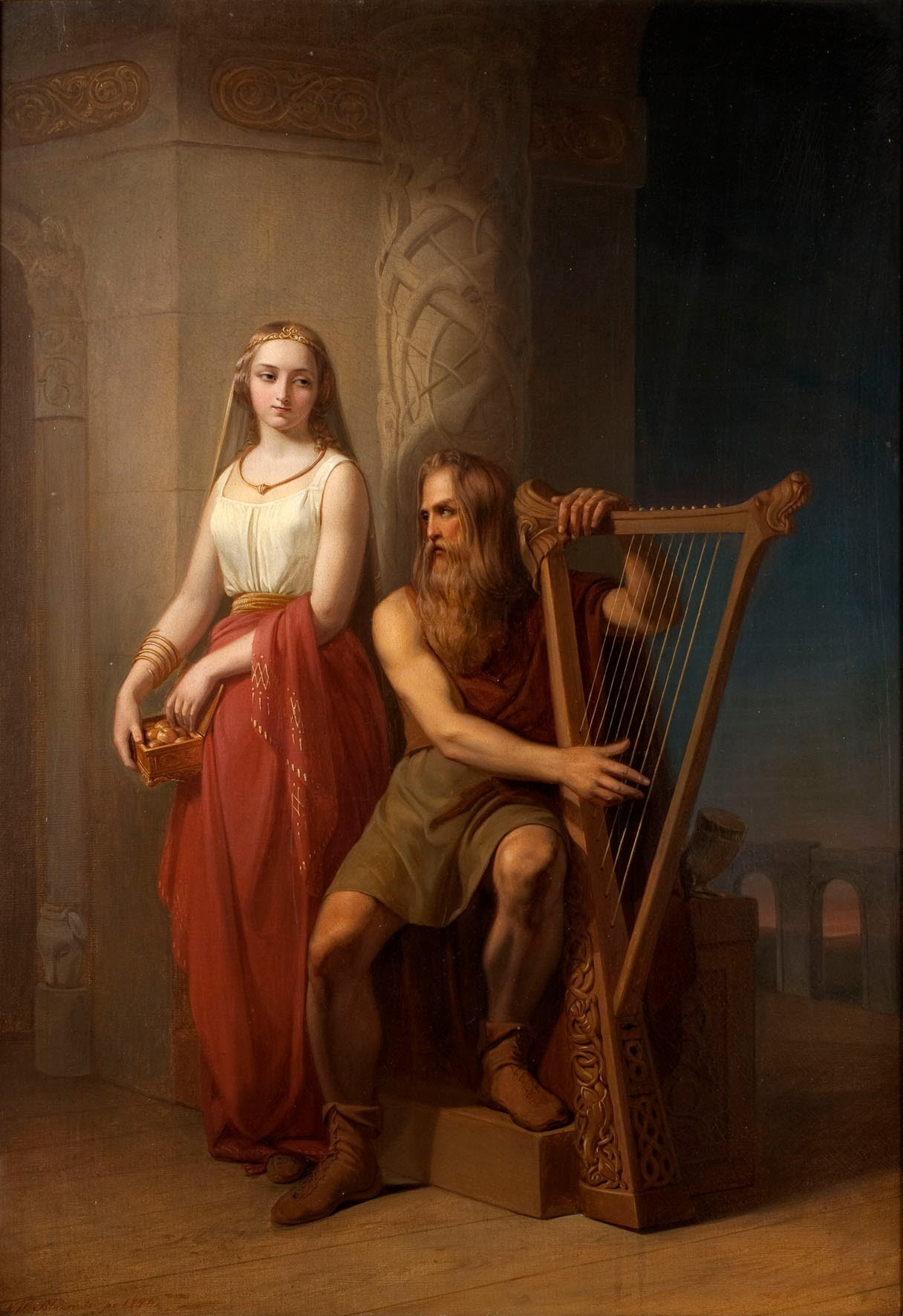
The name of the Norse god of poetry Bragi has been given to the Norwegian literature prize – the Brage Prize.

The Brage Prize (Norwegian: Brageprisen) is a Norwegian literature prize that is awarded annually by the Norwegian Book Prize foundation (Den norske bokprisen). The prize recognizes recently published Norwegian literature.

The Brage Prize has been awarded each fall since 1992 for the following categories:

- Fiction
- Children's literature
- Non-fiction
- Open class – a class which varies each year.

In addition to these classes, during the first several years the prize was also awarded in the following categories:

- Poetry
- Textbooks
- Picture books
- General literature

== Prize winners ==
=== Fiction for adults ===
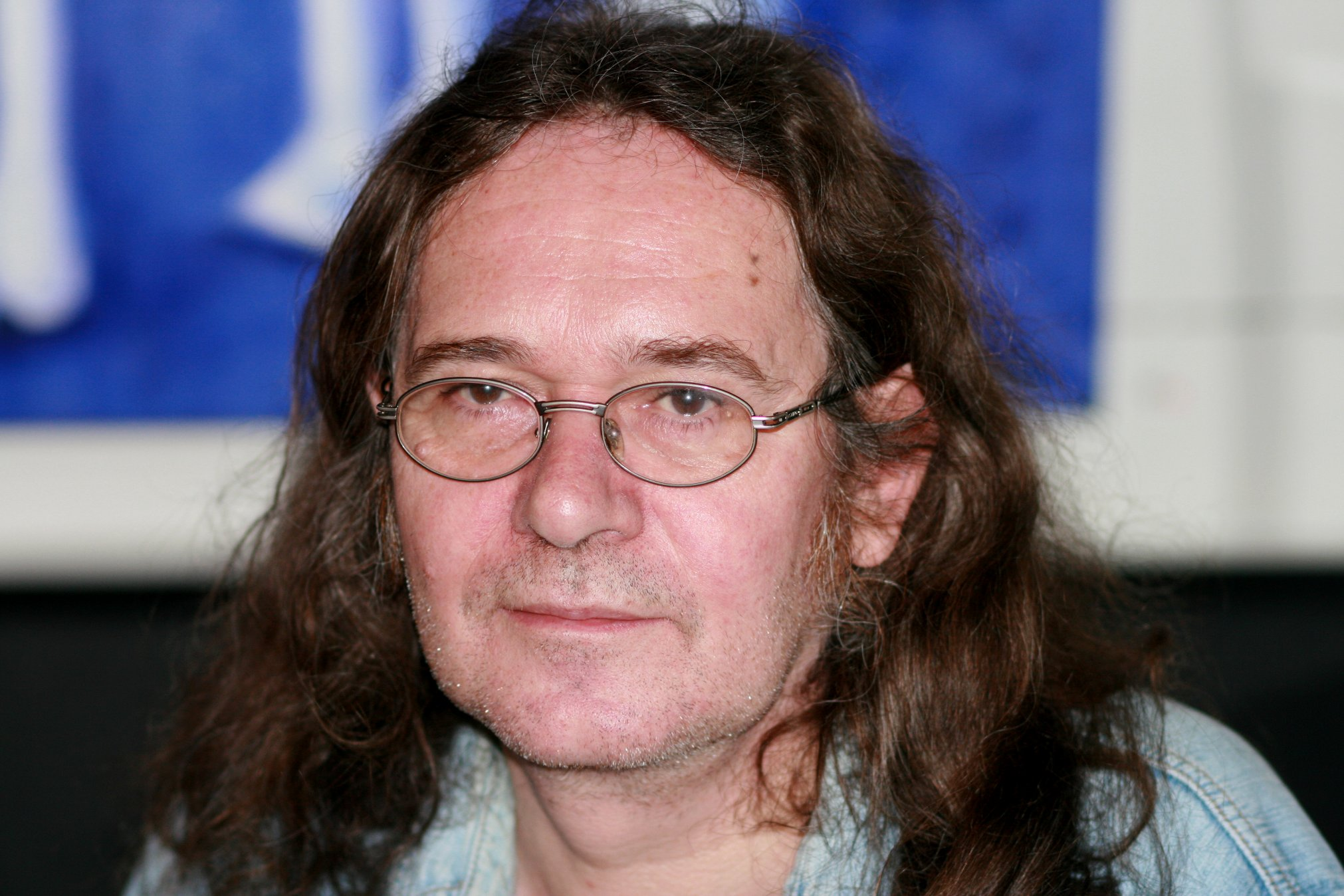
Ingvar Ambjørnsen was awarded the prize in 1995

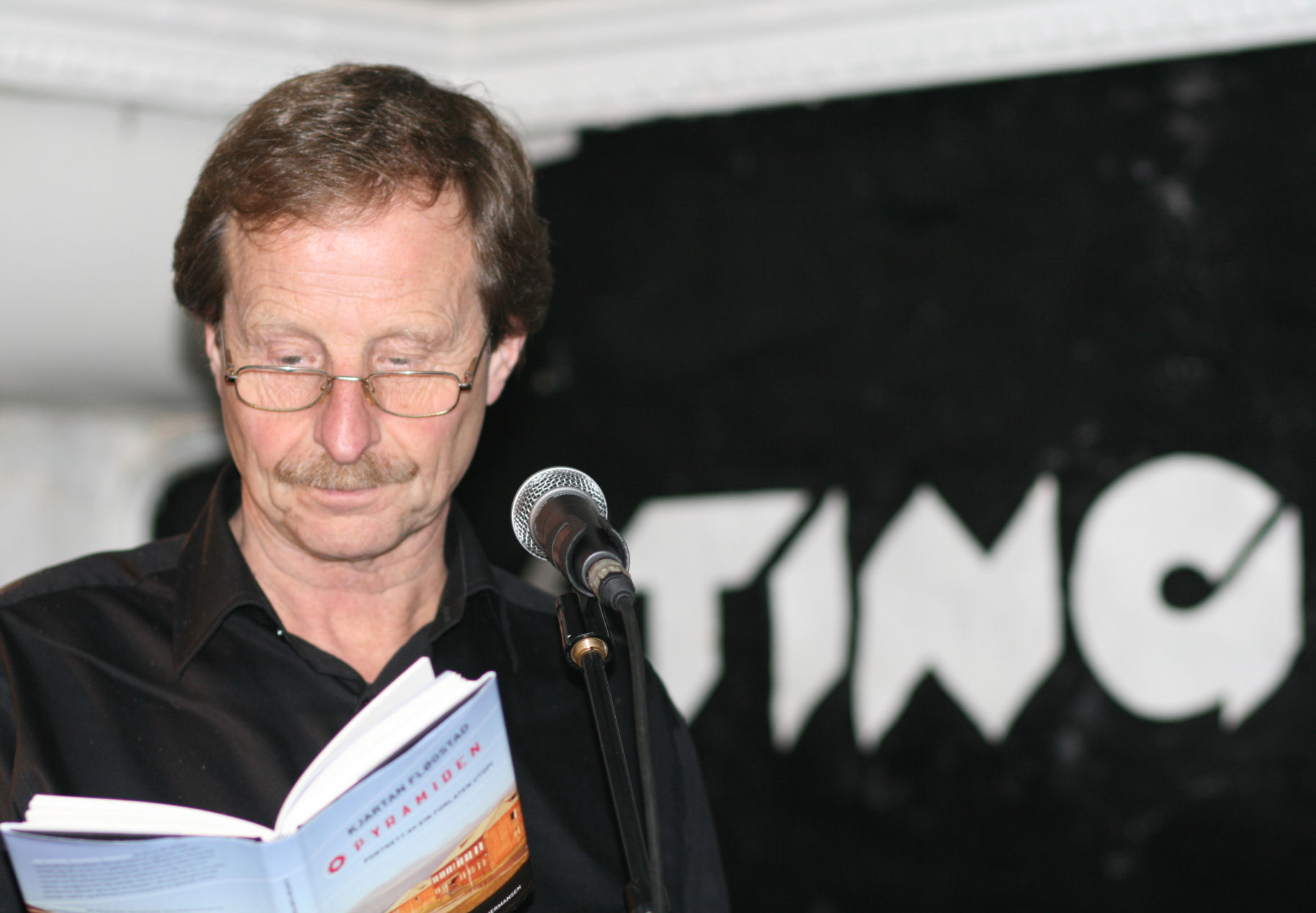
Kjartan Fløgstad was awarded the prize in 1998

- 1992 – Karsten Alnæs, for Trollbyen.
- 1993 – Øystein Lønn, for Thranes metode.
- 1994 – Sigmund Mjelve, for Område aldri fastlagt.
- 1995 – Ingvar Ambjørnsen, for Fugledansen.
- 1996 – Bergljot Hobæk Haff, for Skammen.
- 1997 – Liv Køltzow, for Verden forsvinner.
- 1998 – Kjartan Fløgstad, for Kron og mynt.
- 1999 – Frode Grytten, for Bikubesong.
- 2000 – Per Petterson, for I kjølvannet.
- 2001 – Lars Saabye Christensen, for Halvbroren.
- 2002 – Niels Fredrik Dahl, for På vei til en venn.
- 2003 – Inger Elisabeth Hansen, for Trask.
- 2004 – Hanne Ørstavik, for Presten.
- 2005 – Marita Fossum, for Forestill deg.
- 2006 – Dag Solstad, for Armand V. Fotnoter til en uutgravd roman.
- 2007 – Carl Frode Tiller, for Innsirkling.
- 2008 – Per Petterson, for Jeg forbanner tidens elv.
- 2009 – Karl Ove Knausgård, for Min Kamp. Første bind.
- 2010 - Gaute Heivoll for Før jeg brenner ned.
- 2011 - Tomas Espedal for Imot naturen.
- 2012 - Lars Amund Vaage for Syngja.
- 2013 - Ruth Lillegraven for Urd.
- 2014 - Rune Christiansen for Ensomheten i Lydia Ernemans liv.
- 2015 - Lars Saabye Christensen for Magnet.
- 2016 – Monica Isakstuen for Vær snill med dyrene.
- 2017 – Olaug Nilssen for Tung tids tale.
- 2018 – Tore Kvæven for Når landet mørknar.
- 2019 – Nina Lykke for Full spredning.
- 2020 – Beate Grimsrud for Jeg foreslår at vi våkner.
- 2021 – Jon Fosse for Eit nytt namn (Septologien VI-VII).
- 2022 – Ingeborg Arvola for Kniven i ilden. Ruijan rannalla – Sanger fra Ishavet.
- 2023 – Frode Grytten for Den dagen Nils Vik døde.
- 2024 – Kathrine Nedrejord for Sameproblemet.

=== Children's and young adult literature ===
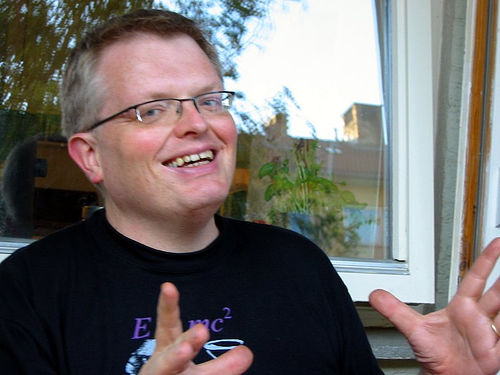
Eirik Newth was awarded the prize in 1996 for Jakten på sannheten.

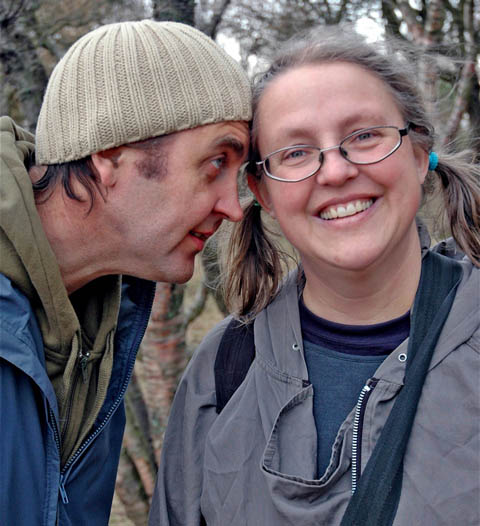
Gro Dahle and illustrator Svein Nyhus were awarded the prize in 2002

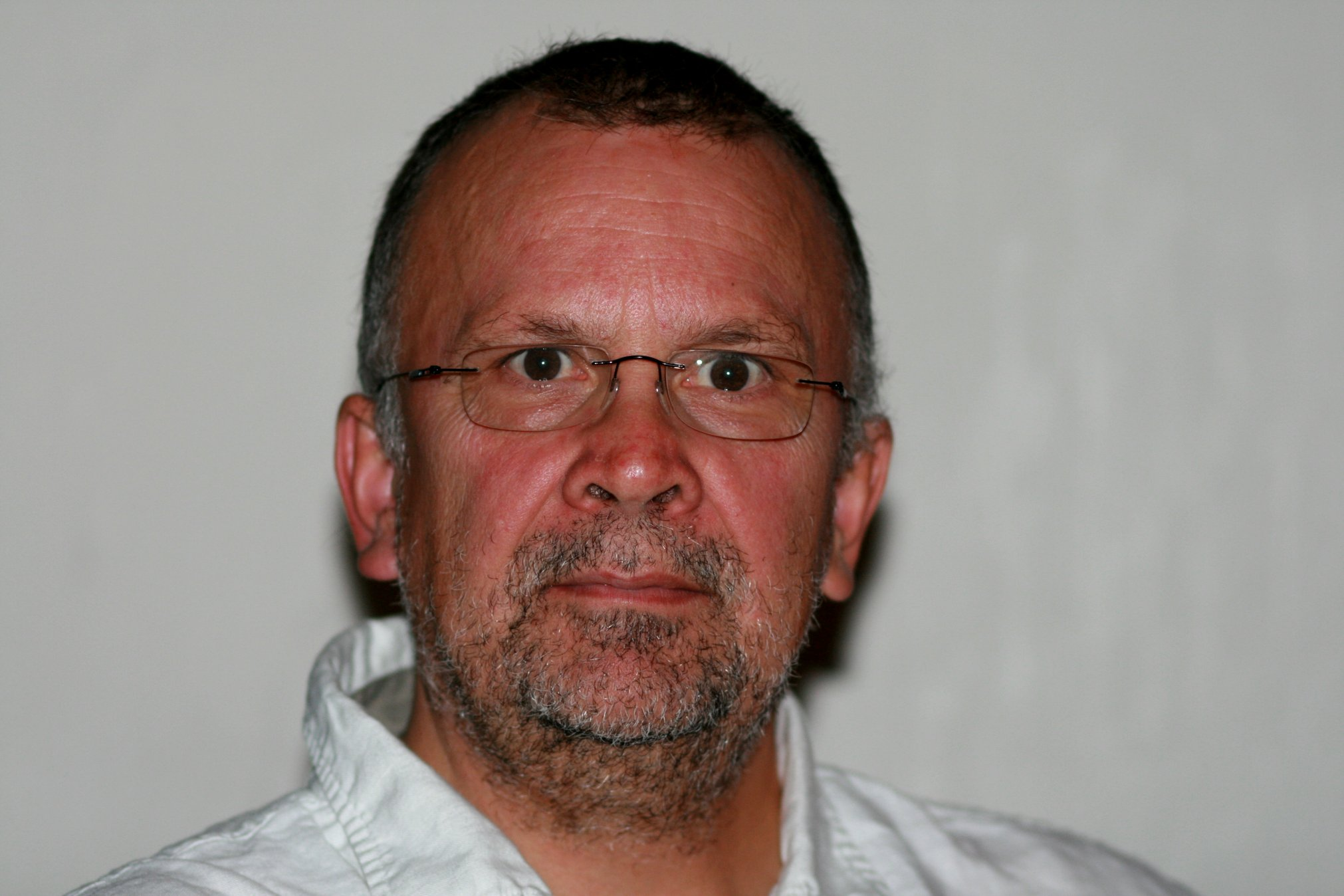
Rune Belsvik was awarded the prize in 2000

- 1992 – Ragnar Hovland, for Ein motorsykkel i natta
- 1993 – Torill Eide, for Skjulte ærend
- 1994 – Klaus Hagerup, for Markus og Diana. Lyset fra Sirius
- 1995 – Liv Marie Austrem and Akin Düzakin, for Tvillingbror
- 1996 – Eirik Newth, for Jakten på sannheten
- 1997 – Harald Rosenløw Eeg, for Vrengt
- 1998 – Stein Erik Lunde, for Eggg
- 1999 – Erna Osland, for Salamanderryttaren
- 2000 – Rune Belsvik, for Ein naken gut
- 2001 – Anne B. Ragde, for Biografien om Sigrid Undset. Ogsaa en ung Pige
- 2002 – Gro Dahle and Svein Nyhus, for Snill
- 2003 – Helga Gunerius Eriksen and Gry Moursund, for Flugepapir
- 2004 – Harald Rosenløw Eeg, for Yatzy
- 2005 – Arne Svingen, for Svart elfenben
- 2006 – Stian Hole, for Garmanns sommer
- 2007 – Linn T. Sunne, for Happy
- 2008 – Johan Harstad, for Darlah - 172 timer på månen
- 2009 – Maria Parr, for Tonje Glimmerdal
- 2010 – Hilde Kvalvaag, for Fengsla
- 2011 – Inga Sætre, for Fallteknikk
- 2012 - Kari Stai for Jakob og Neikob. Tjuven slår tilbake
- 2013 - Brynjulf Jung Tjønn for Så vakker du er
- 2014 - Annette Münch for Badboy: Steroid
- 2015 - Torun Lian and Øyvind Torseter for Reserveprinsesse Andersen
- 2016 – Anders N. Kvammen for Ungdomsskolen
- 2017 – Maria Parr for Keeperen og havet
- 2018 – Anna Fiske for Elven
- 2019 – Ane Barmen for Draumar betyr ingenting.
- 2020 – Jenny Jordahl for Hva skjedde egentlig med deg?.
- 2021 – Erlend Skjetne for Eit anna blikk.
- 2022 – Julia Kahrs for Familien Brattbakk.
- 2023 – Maria Parr/Åshild Irgens for Oskar og eg.

=== Non-fiction ===
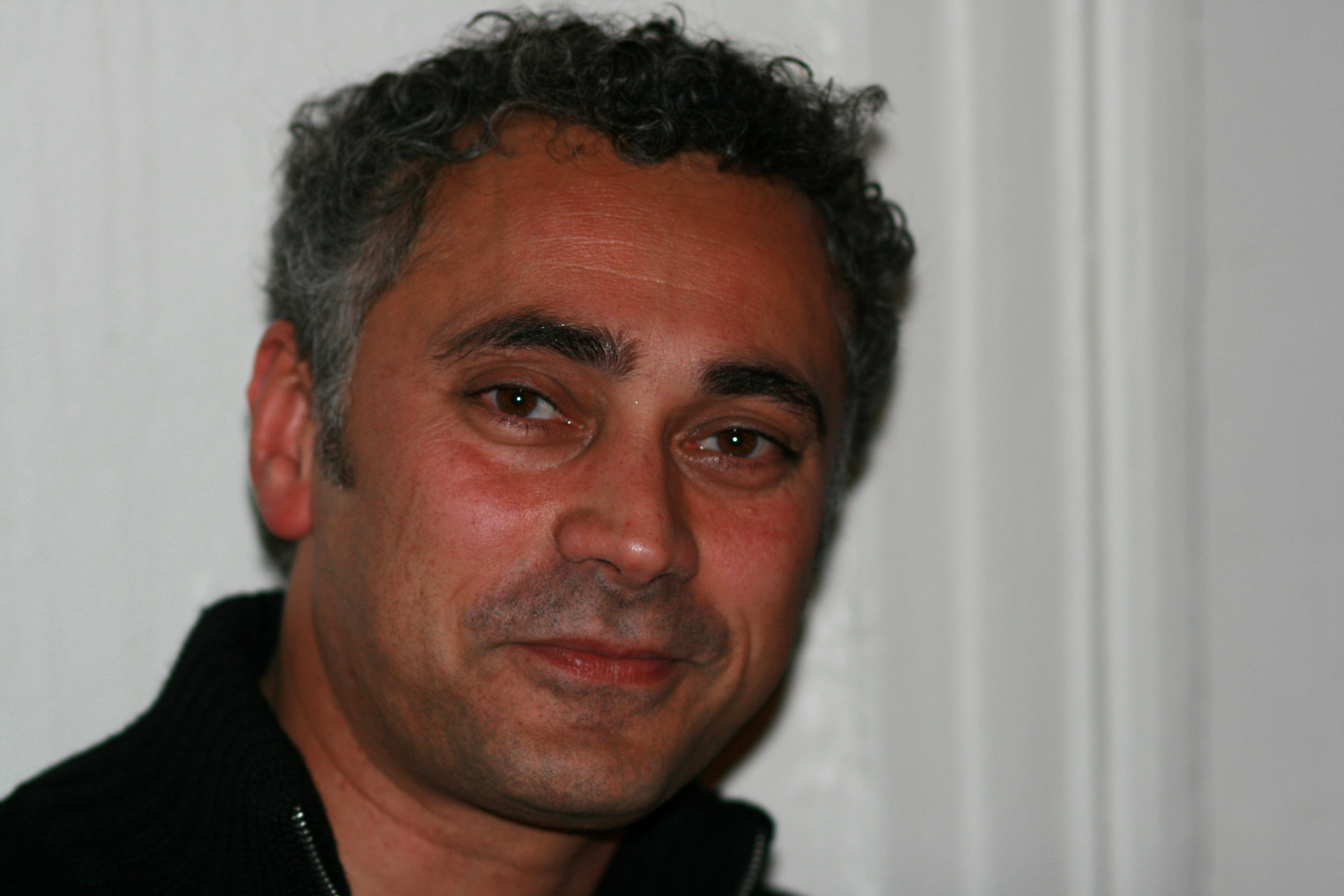
Ivo de Figueiredo was awarded the prize in 2002

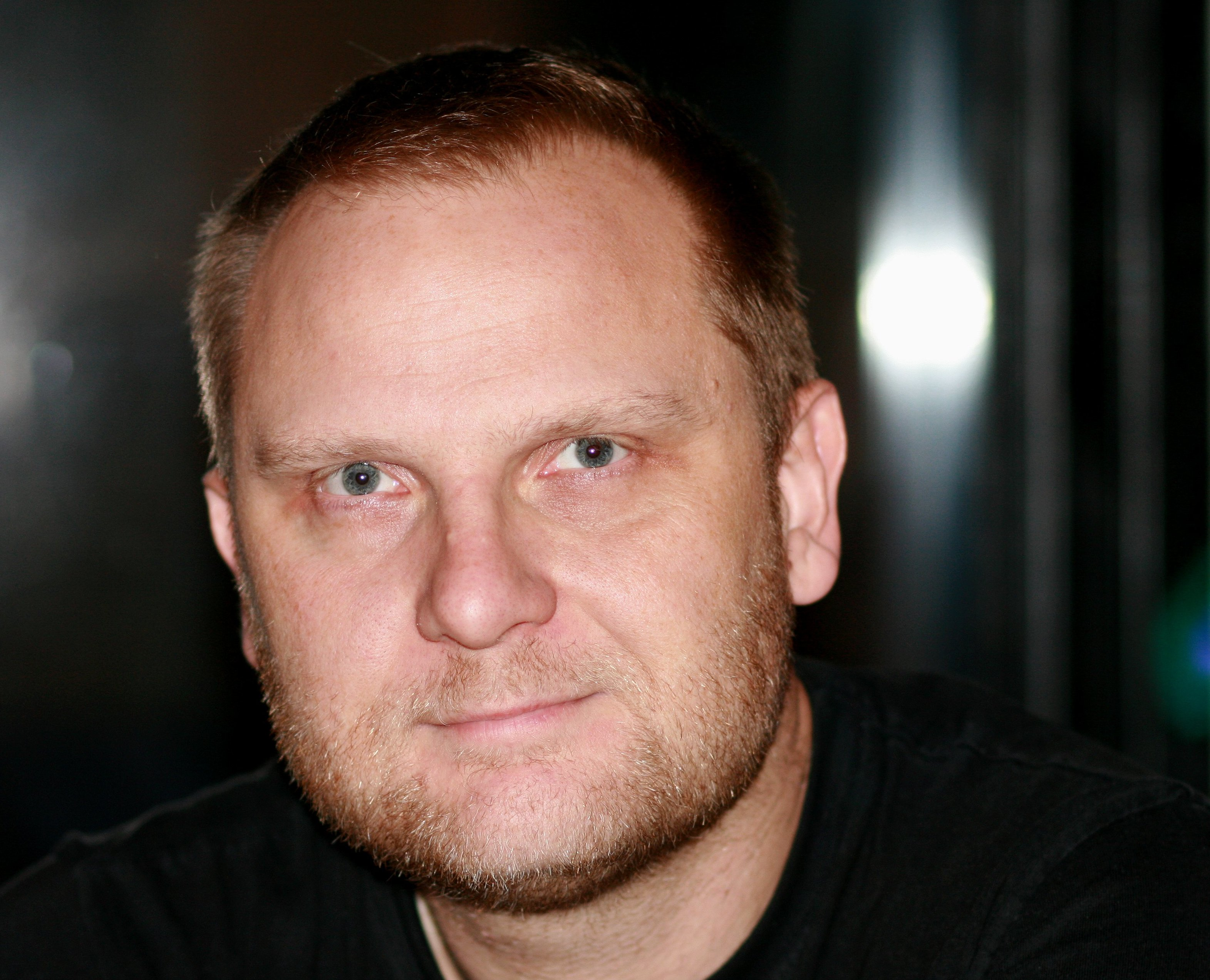
Frank Rossavik was awarded the prize in 2007

- 1992 – Arne Forsgren, for Rockleksikon
- 1993 – Trond Berg Eriksen, for Reisen gjennom helvete. Dantes inferno
- 1994 – Einar-Arne Drivenes, Marit Anne Hauan and Helge A. Wold, for Nordnorsk kulturhistorie
- 1995 – Espen Dietrichs and Leif Gjerstad, for Vår fantastiske hjerne
- 1996 – Arild Stubhaug, for Et foranskutt lyn. Niels Henrik Abel og hans tid
- 1997 – Anne Wichstrøm, for Kvinneliv, kunstnerliv. Kvinnelige malere i Nørge før 1900
- 1998 – Leif Ryvarden/Klaus Høiland, for Er det liv, er det sopp
- 1999 – Torbjørn Færøvik, for India – Stevnemøte med skjebnen
- 2000 – Johan Galtung, for Johan uten land. På fredsveien gjennom verden
- 2001 – Atle Næss, for Da jorden stod stille – Galileo Galilei og hans tid
- 2002 – Ivo de Figueiredo, for Fri mann: Johan Bernhard Hjort — en dannelsesreise
- 2003 – Knut Kjeldstadli (editor), for Norsk innvandringshistorie I–III'
- 2004 – Tor Bomann-Larsen, for Folket. Haakon & Maud II
- 2005 – Odd Karsten Tveit, for Krig og diplomati. Oslo–Jerusalem 1978–1996
- 2006 – Bent Sofus Tranøy, for Markedets makt over sinnene
- 2007 – Frank Rossavik, for Stikk i strid. Ein biografi om Einar Førde
- 2008 – Bjørn Westlie, for Fars krig
- 2009 – Kjetil Stensvik Østli, for Politi og røver
- 2010 – Tone Huse, for Tøyengata - et nyriktstykke Norge
- 2011 – Simen Ekern, for Roma. Nye fascister, røde terrorister og drømmen om det søte liv
- 2012 – Torbjørn Færøvik, for Maos rike. En lidelseshistorie
- 2013 - Steffen Kværneland for Munch
- 2014 - Marte Michelet for Den største forbrytelsen
- 2015 - Morten Strøknsnes for Havboka
- 2016 – Åsne Seierstad for To søstre
- 2017 – Thomas Reinertsen Berg for Verdensteater
- 2018 – Helene Uri for Hvem sa hva?
- 2019 – Torgrim Eggen for Axel. Fra smokken til Ovnen.
- 2020 – Dag O. Hessen for Verden på vippepunktet.
- 2021 – Lena Lindgren for Ekko – et essay om algoritmer og begjær.
- 2022 – Trygve Riiser Gundersen for Haugianerne.
- 2023 - Inga Strümke for Maskiner som tenker

=== Open class ===
- 1996 – Sven Kærup Bjørneboe, for the essay "Jerusalem, en sentimental reise" (Jeruslam, a Sentimental Journey)
- 1997 – Liv Marie Austrem and Akin Düzakin, for a children's picturebook "Tvillingsøster" (Twin Sisters)
- 1998 – Christian Rugstad, for translation of The Year of the Death of Ricardo Reis by José Saramago
- 1999 – Anders Heger, for the biography "Mykle. Et diktet liv" (Mykle. The Poetry Life)
- 2000 – Karin Fossum, for the crime novel "Elskede Poona" (Calling Out for You)
- 2001 – Annie Riis, for poetry "Himmel av stål" (Heaven of Steel)
- 2002 – Synne Sun Løes, for a children's book "Å spise blomster til frokost" (Eating Flowers for Breakfast)
- 2003 – Torbjørn Færøvik, for travel literature "Kina. En reise på livets elv" (China. A Voyage on the River of Life)
- 2004 – Arne Lygre, for the collection of short stories "Tid inne" (In Time)
- 2005 – John Arne Sæterøy (who signs his work as "Jason"), for the comic "La meg vise deg noe…" (Let Me Show You Something...)
- 2006 – Kathinka Blichfeldt, Tor Gunnar Heggem and Ellen Larsen, for a textbook "Kontekst. Basisbok i norsk for ungdomstrinnet" (Context. A Foundation in Norwegian for Secondary Schools)
- 2007 – Jon Ewo and Bjørn Ousland, for a case study for children "Fortellingen om et mulig drap" (The Story About a Possible Murder)
- 2008 – Øyvind Rimbereid, for the poetry collection Herbarium
- 2009 – Bjørn Alex Herrman, for his translation of Moby-Dick by Herman Melville
- 2010 – Stian Hole, for the picture book Garmanns hemmelighet (Garmann's Secret)
- 2011 – Arnhild Skre, for her biographical work Hulda Garborg. Nasjonal strateg (Hulda Garborg. National Strategist)
- 2012 – Linn T. Sunne, for her young adult novel Lille Ekorn (Little Squirrel)
- 2013 - Yann de Caprona for his fact book for adults Norsk etymologisk ordbok
- 2014 - Ingvild H. Rishøi for her collection of short stories Vinternoveller
- 2015 - Kjell Ola Dahl for his crime novel Kureren
- 2016 – Gudny Ingebjørg Hagen and Malgorzata Piotrowska (ill.) for Fest og feiring
- 2017 – Cecilie Løveid for Vandreutstillinger
- 2018 – Anja Røyne for Menneskets grunnstoffer
- 2019 – Martin Ernstsen for Sult.
- 2020 – Thomas Horne for Den store klimaguiden.
- 2021 – Mariangela Di Fiore and Cathrine Trønnes Lie for Søstre. Min historie etter Utøya.
- 2022 – Ida Larmo for Rigel. Urettens ekko.

=== Honorary Award ===
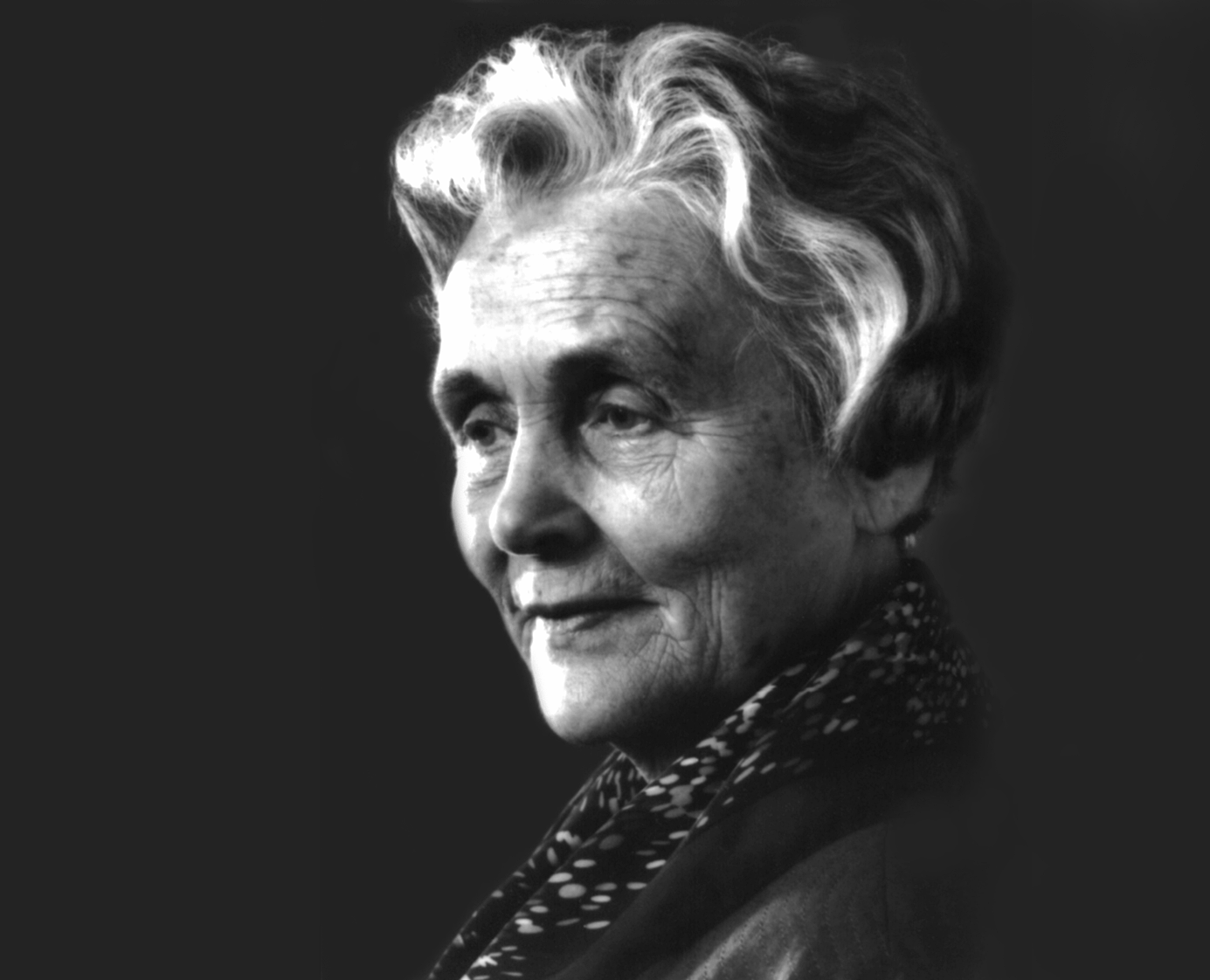
Poet Halldis Moren Vesaas won in 1994

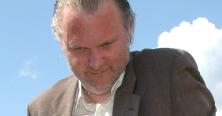
Playwiright Jon Fosse won in 2005

- 1992 – Sigmund Skard
- 1993 – N/A
- 1994 – Halldis Moren Vesaas
- 1995 – Anne-Cath. Vestly
- 1996 – Kjell Askildsen
- 1997 – Jan Erik Vold
- 1998 – Dag Solstad
- 1999 – Kjell Aukrust
- 2000 – Eldrid Lunden
- 2001 – Jon Bing
- 2002 – Jostein Gaarder
- 2003 – Karsten Alnæs
- 2004 – NORLA – center for Norwegian fiction and nonfiction in foreign countries.
- 2005 – Jon Fosse
- 2006 – Kari and Kjell Risvik
- 2007 – Guri Vesaas
- 2008 – Kjartan Fløgstad
- 2009 – Tor Åge Bringsværd
- 2010 – Herbjørg Wassmo
- 2011 – Kolbein Falkeid
- 2012 – Knut Faldbakken
- 2013 - The Norwegian Public Libraries
- 2014 - Vigdis Hjorth
- 2015 - Einar Økland
- 2016 – Elisabeth Aasen
- 2017 – Kari Grossmann
- 2018 – Klaus Hagerup
- 2019 – Edvard Hoem
- 2020 – Dag O. Hessen
- 2021 – Liv Køltzow
- 2022 – Gro Dahle
- 2023 – Ingvar Ambjørnsen
- 2024 – Lars Saabye Christensen
- 2025 – Anna Fiske

== Previous categories ==
=== Textbooks ===
- 1992 – Askeland m.fl., for Soria Moria
- 1993 – Tore Linné Eriksen, for Norge og verden fra 1850–1940
- 1994 – Benestad m.fl., for Tallenes tale – Matematikk for 5 timers grunnkurs
- 1995 – Astrid Carlson, Svein Olav Drangeid og Truls Lind, for Humanbiologi

=== Poetry ===
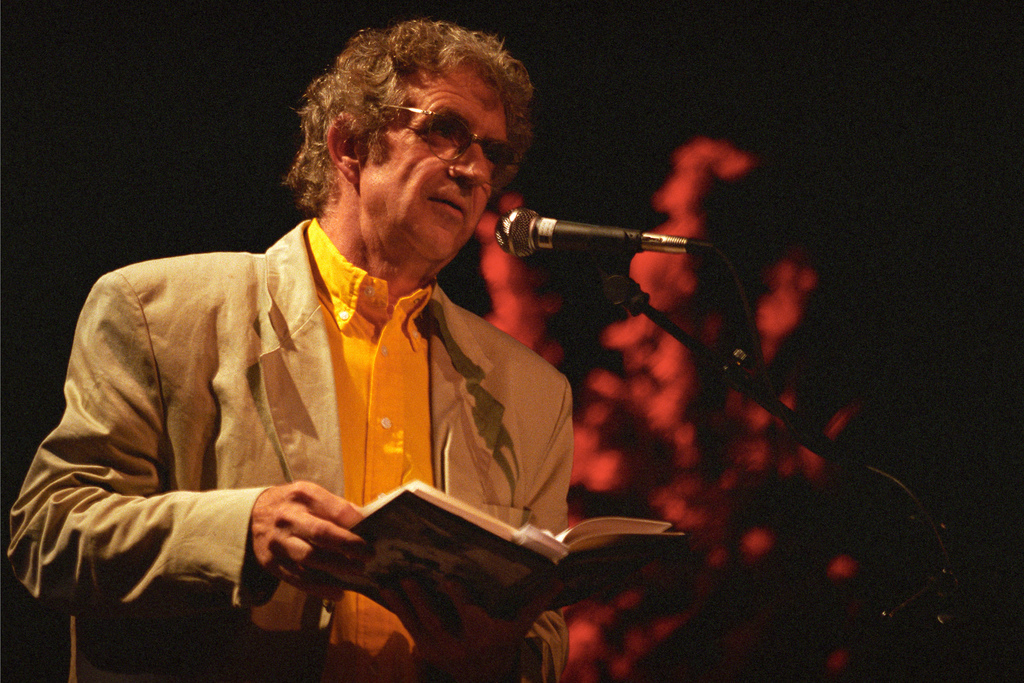
Poet Jan Erik Vold won the prize for IKKE in 1993.

- 1992 – Paal-Helge Haugen, for Sone 0
- 1993 – Jan Erik Vold, for IKKE
- 1995 – Øyvind Berg, for Forskjellig

=== Picture books ===
- 1992 – Sissel Solbjørg Bjugn and Fam Ekman, for Jente i bitar
- 1993 – Else Færden and Sissel Gjersum, for Garnnøstet som forsvant

=== General literature ===
- 1992 – Ida Blom m.fl., for Cappelens kvinnehistorie
- 1993 – Tordis Ørjasæter, for Menneskenes hjerte. Sigrid Undset - en
