= Ingvild H. Rishøi =

Norwegian writer and journalist

- Born: 24 August 1978 (age 46); Oslo, Norway
- Occupation: Novelist, short story writer Journalist
- Genre: Literary fiction, children's
- Notable works: Vinternoveller (2014)
- Notable awards: Norwegian Critics Prize (2014); Dobloug Prize (2024)

Website
- www.rishoi.no

Ingvild Hedemann Rishøi (born 24 August 1978) is a Norwegian writer and journalist.

She won the Sult Prize in 2012, and both the Brage Prize (open class) and the Norwegian Critics Prize for Literature in 2014 for Vinternoveller. She was awarded the Dobloug Prize in 2024.

== Life work ==
As a journalist she has worked for Dagbladet and Dagens Næringsliv, particularly within feature journalism.

She has published the children's books Unbrakomonsteret – Ikea om natten (2007) and Pling i bollen – fine og ufine barnerim (2012) with Cappelen Damm. Her short story collections La stå (2007), Historien om Fru Berg (2011), and Vinternoveller (2014), and the novel Stargate – en julefortelling (2021) were published by Gyldendal Norsk Forlag.

Her work appeared in Dial.

== Awards ==
Year	Work	Award	Category	Result	Ref
2012	?	Sult Prize	—	Won	
2014	Vinternoveller	Brage Prize	Open class	Won	
2014	Vinternoveller	Norwegian Critics Prize for Literature	Adult	Won	
2024	—	Dobloug Prize	Norwegian	Won	

== Bibliography ==
=== Novels ===
- Stargate – en julefortelling (2021)
  - Rishøi, Ingvild (2024). Brightly Shining. Translated by Caroline Waight. New York: Grove Press. ISBN 978-0-8021-6349-3.

=== Children's books ===
- Unbrakomonsteret – Ikea om natten (2007)
- Pling i bollen – fine og ufine barnerim (2012)

=== Short story collections ===
- La stå (2007)
- Historien om Fru Berg (2011)
- Vinternoveller (2014)

== External ==
- Official website

Awards
Preceded by Gaute Heivoll	Recipient of the Sult Prize; 2012	Succeeded by Eirik Ingebrigtsen
Preceded by Yann de Caprona	Recipient of the Brage Prize, open class 2014	Succeeded by Kjell Ola Dahl
Preceded by Øyvind Rimbereid	Recipient of the Norwegian Critics Prize for Literature; 2014	Succeeded by Inger Elisabeth Hansen
