= Åshild Irgens =

Norwegian illustrator (born 1976)

Åshild Anita Irgens (born 7 February 1976) is a Norwegian illustrator. She has illustrated several children's books for the publishers Aschehoug, Damm, Samlaget and Gyldendal, among them the novel Tonje Glimmerdal by Maria Parr, a recipient of the Brage Prize.

== Illustrations ==
Authors/books Irgens has illustrated for:

- 2005: Kjersti Scheen: Øyenvitnet
- 2006: Marianne Viermyr: Bølla Britt og Rita Rapp
- 2006: Kjersti Scheen: Linnea og kastanjeprinsen
- 2007: Rasmus Løland: Gutar
- 2007: Rasmus Løland: Kvitebjørnen
- 2007: Rita Løvseth Sandnes: Lovise flytter
- 2007: Tone Kjærnli: Oldefars øye
- 2008: Bjørg Øygarden: Askeladden og de nye hjelperne
- 2008: Naja Marie Aidt: Huset
- 2008: Rita Løvseth Sandnes: Lovise får en venn
- 2009: Camilla Dahle Otterlei: Klara og verdens fineste Pekal
- 2009: Hans Sande: Er du blind i dag, Elise?
- 2009: Maria Parr: Tonje Glimmerdal
- 2009: Rita Løvseth Sandnes: Lovise og de førti røverne
- 2009: Tone Kjærnli: Dummedagen
- 2009: Prinsessen som ikke ville leke i Den store hvite prinsesseboka
- 2010: Hans Sande: Hopp i havet, Elise!
- 2010: Åse Ombustvedt: Jo og Gjedda
- 2010: Camilla Dahle Otterlei: Klara og gangsterklubbe
- 2010: Mari Sager: Monster-Frida
- 2010: Mari Sager: Doktor-Frida
- 2010: Signe Olaug Pedersen: Sprett i håret - sug i magen
- 2011: Mari Sager: Stjele-Frida
- 2011: Sonya Hartnett: Sølveselet
- 2011: Mari Sager: Pannekake-Frida
- 2011: Inger Marie Kjølstadmyr: Henrik og badesvampen - bildebok
- 2011: Sigrid Merethe Hanssen: Detektiv Smartbart og sabotasjen på badet
- 2011: Karin Kinge Lindboe: Helt på trynet forelska
- 2012: René Zografos: Stinke og stanken - bildebok
- 2012: Mari Sager: Spion-Frida
- 2012: Erna Osland: Hør!
- 2013: Mari Sager: Skremme-Frida
- 2013: Charlotte Glaser Munch: Kinaputten
- 2014: Charlotte Glaser Munch: Monsterbakken
- 2014: Birte Svatun: Tenkeboka
- 2014: Birgitta Nilsson: Fikenvulkanen
- 2014: Laura Djupvik: God dag, herr Jul
- 2014: Mari Kjetun: Kattekameratene
- 2015: Ingvild Bjerkeland: Monsterbølger – bildebok
- 2015: Mina Lystad: Alfred må lese høyt
- 2016: Jørn Roeim: Den store, sprø dyreboka – gjennomillustrert vitsebok
- 2016: Ingeborg Eliassen: Snarveien – bildebok
- 2016: Johan B. Mjønes: Sov godt, Lukas – bildebok
- 2016: Mina Lystad: Helmer og Matilda - Aksjon Bestevenn
- 2017: Johan B. Mjønes: Hva gjør du, Lukas – bildebok
- 2018: Ingelin Røssland: Stjålet venn
- 2018: Johan B. Mjønes: Lukas og spurven – bildebok
- 2018: Bjørn Ingvaldsen: Natt
