= Julia Kahrs =

Julia Lossius Kahrs (born 1985) is a Norwegian children's writer.

== Career ==
She made her literary debut with Sølvrevene, published by Gyldendal Norsk Forlag in 2009. She followed with Øst for Dunkelpiggen (2012), Billie Ve (2014), Gresshoppens sang (2019) and Familien Brattbakk (2022), all on Gyldendal. The latter earned her a Brage Prize for children's and young adult literature in 2022. Familien Brattbakk was also nominated for the Ark children's literature prize.

In 2023 she was awarded a statens kunstnerstipend grant that allowed her to write full-time. She followed with more children's books on Gyldendal, Noor og miniatyren (2023) and Noor og mysterieklubben (2024).

== Personal life ==
She hails from Son. She is married to Heidi Bruvik Kahrs; they resided in Grünerløkka before relocating to Son in 2020.

Awards
Preceded by Erlend Skjetne	Recipient of the Brage Prize for children's and young adult literature 2022	Succeeded by Maria Parr
