= Hauan =

Hauan is a surname of Norwegian origin.

== People with the surname ==
- Anne Grethe Hauan (born 1966), Norwegian politician
- Åshild Hauan (1941–2017), Norwegian politician
- Haakon Hauan (1871–1961), Norwegian politician
- Jakop Janssønn Hauan (born 1986), Norwegian jazz musician
- Marit Anne Hauan (born 1955), Norwegian folklorist, museum leader and non-fiction writer
- Nicolai Hauan, Norwegian singer from the rock band Postgirobygget

== See also ==
- Hauran
