= Steffen Kverneland =

Norwegian illustrator and comics writer (born 1963)

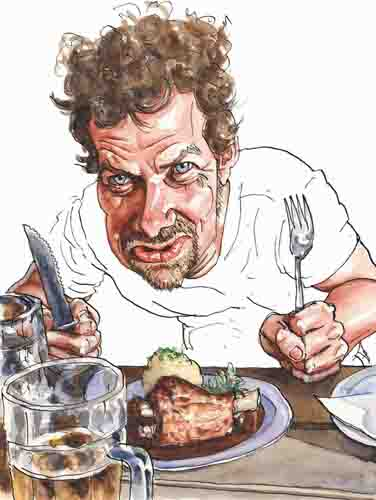
- Steffen Kverneland, self portrait
- Born: 14 January 1963 (age 63); Haugesund, Norway
- Occupations: Illustrator and comics writer
- Awards: Sproing Award; Urhunden; Brage Prize for non-fiction

Steffen Kverneland (born 14 January 1963) is a Norwegian illustrator and comics writer. He was born in Haugesund, and settled in Oslo from 1987. He has specialized on creating comics series based on classical literature. Among his early albums are De knyttede never from 1993 based on a novel by Øvre Richter Frich, and four volumes of Amputerte klassikere.

He was awarded the Brage Prize for non-fiction in 2013, for the biography Munch, a collection of his albums based on the life of painter Edvard Munch. Munch has been translated into several languages, including French, Dutch, German, Polish, Danish and Korean, supported by Norla, the foundation for Norwegian Literature Abroad.

== Early publications ==
Kverneland published the comics strip Peer Grynt in the magazine Konk in 1980, when he was sixteen years old. In 1982 his strip Den moderne Odysseen, with the character "Karsten Zarathustra", was published in the magazine Brage, under pen name "S. Susej". During the period 1989-1991 he published various comics strips in the magazine Norsk MAD. Among these were Rotta Rolf, Ynglinge Saga, and Trikkekonduktøren. He also contributed to the newspapers Dagbladet and Dag og Tid, and to the magazines Vagant and Inside Data.

== Adaptation of literary works ==
Among Kverneland's specialties is the adaptation of classical literary texts into comics strips or albums. His album De knyttede never was awarded the Sproing Award in 1993. Further, he developed a series of "amputated classics", from 1994 onwards.

=== The clenched fists ===
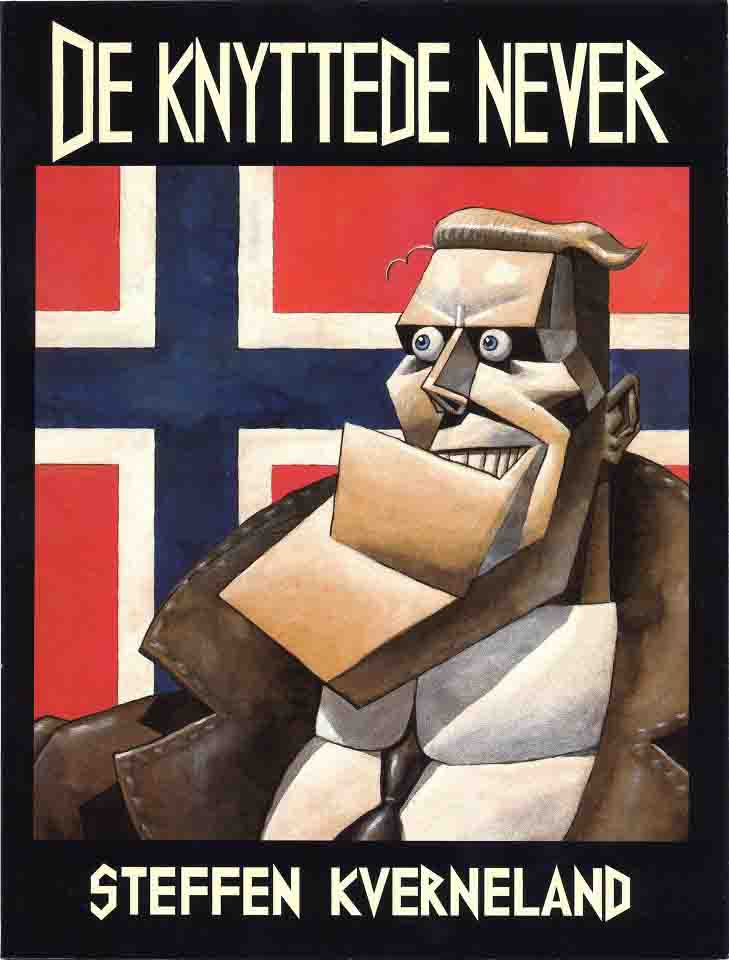
Front cover of the comics album De knyttede never from 1993.

De knyttede never (English: The clenched fists) is an action novel from 1911, written by Øvre Richter Frich. It is the first of a series of 21 novels about the character "Jonas Fjeld", an athletic physician and adventurer. Kverneland had the first pages of his adaptation published in the magazine TEGN in 1991. The album was issued in 1993, and earned him the Sproing Award for best Norwegian comics series in 1993.

During the creation process Kverneland had to do some historical research in order to get buildings, interior, clothing, historical setting etc. as correct as possible. He visited Bank of Norway to prepare for the bank robbery scene, and studied photos of old trains for the scenes from the recently opened Bergen Line. The "new" City hall, location for a reception held for the South Pole Expedition described in the novel, was pure fictional, as there was no new City Hall in Oslo in 1911.

=== Amputated classics ===
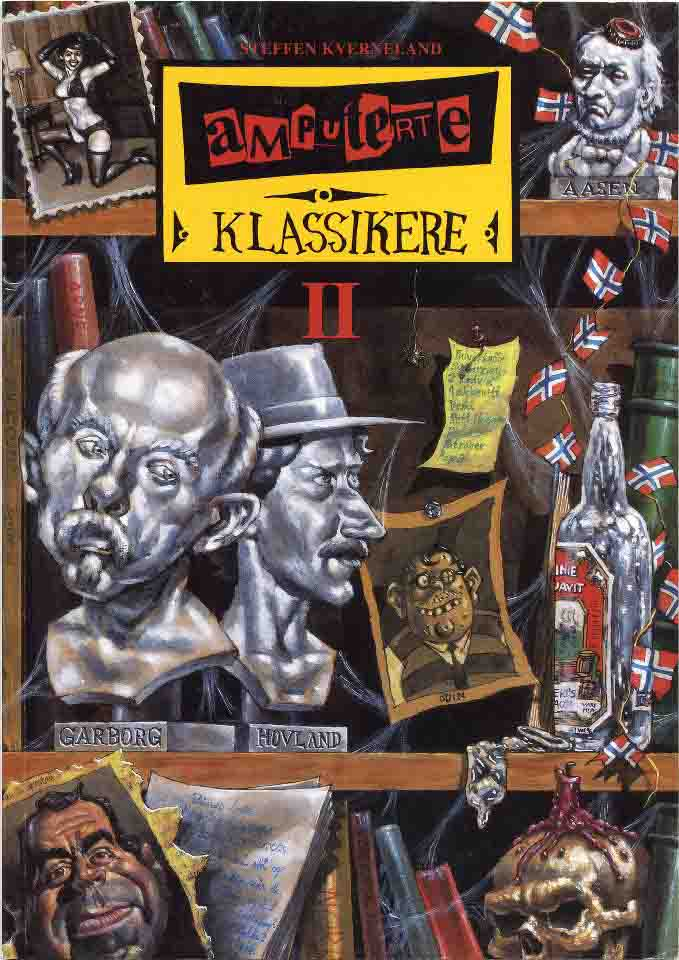
Front cover of the comics album Amputerte klassikere II from 1996.

- Amputerte klassikere (album, 1994)
- Amputerte klassikere II (album, 1996)
- Amputerte klassikere III (album, 1999)
- Garborg & co (2001)
- Amputerte klassikere IV (album, 2001)

== Comics biographies ==
Kverneland received a two years public grant in 2003.

=== Olaf Gulbransson ===
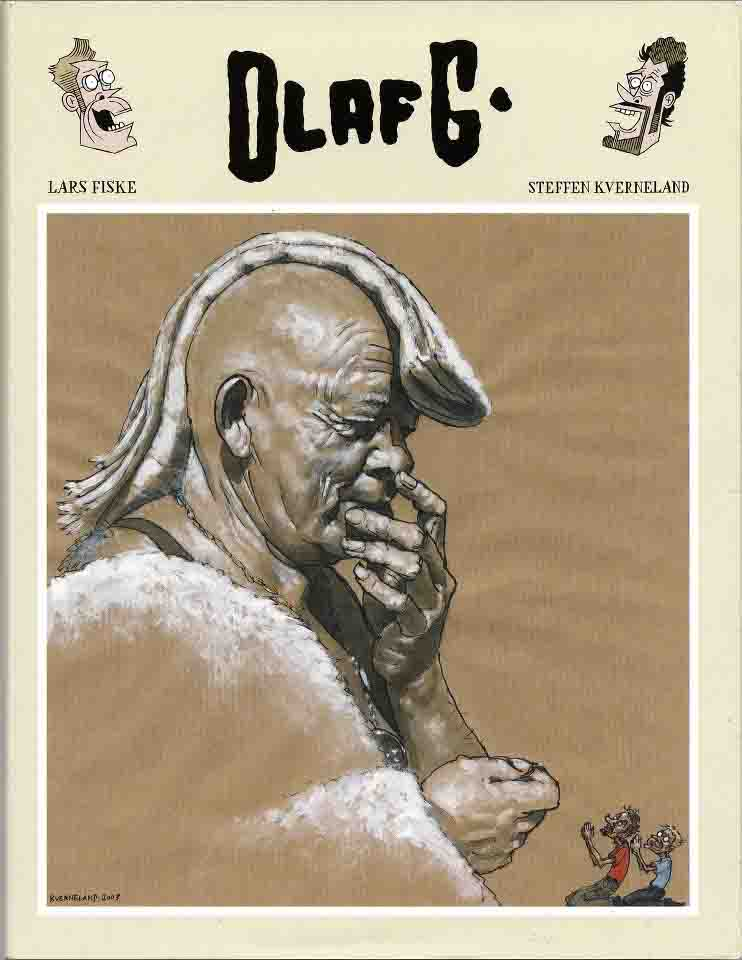
Front cover of the comics album Olaf G. from 2004.

He published the album Olaf G. in 2004, a cooperation with Lars Fiske. The album is an adaptation of the biography of illustrator and cartoonist Olaf Gulbransson, and won the Sproing Award for 2004, in addition to other prizes. It was translated into German language, and the translation into Swedish resulted in the comics award Urhunden in 2008.

=== Edvard Munch ===
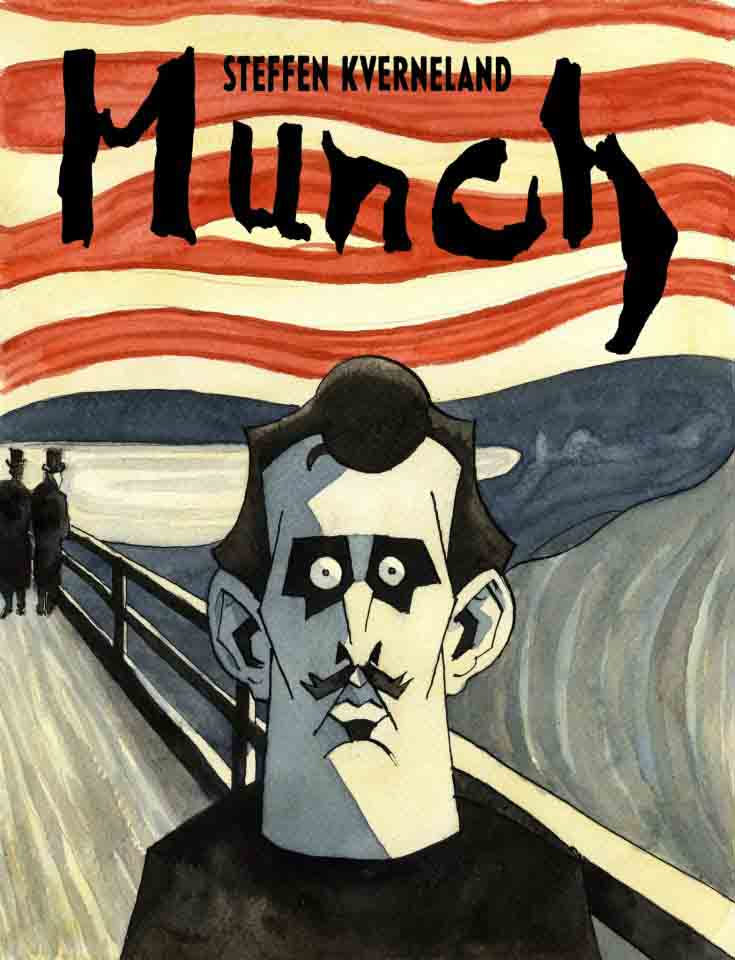
Front cover of the comics biography Munch from 2013.

The album series Kanon from 2006 onwards was again a cooperation between Fiske and Kverneland, where they made comics biographies of the painters Kurt Schwitters and Edvard Munch. The album Kanon 3 earned them the Sproing Award in 2009. The biographical book Munch from 2013, based on the Kanon albums, was awarded the Brage Prize.

Awards
Preceded by Torbjørn Færøvik	Recipient of the Brage Prize for prose 2013	Succeeded by Marte Michelet
