= Else Færden =

Norwegian writer (born 1952)

Else Birgitte Færden (born 4 May 1952) is a Norwegian children's writer.

== Personal life ==
A daughter of Wilhelm and Birgitt Færden, her mother was Danish. In March 1985, Else Færden married author Tor Åge Bringsværd. They resided in Hølen.

== Career ==
She made her literary debut as a playwright with Speiltrollet in 1985. Garnnøstet som forsvant earned her a Brage Prize for picture books in 1993. The subcategory was later discontinued. In 1998 she won the Riksmål Society children's book award for Vingefolket.

She also released several children's books on Cappelen; Anna og pandabjørn (1996), Den usynlige damen (1997), Anna får en katt (1999), Verdens beste bamse (2001) and En stjerne i natten (2002). In 2005 she released H. C. Andersen - den modige andungen which was a dramatic account of H. C. Andersen's early life, and in 2008 she released a biography for children about Henrik Wergeland, Henrik Wergeland - dikter og villstyring, She has also released other factual books for children, including a book on gardening, Alle barns hagebok. She has released one non-fiction book for adults, Norges minste by - en vandring i Hølen med Helge Holter, about the former town of Hølen.

Awards
Preceded by Sissel Solbjørg Bjugn; Fam Ekman	Recipient of the Brage Prize for picture books 1993 (with Sissel Gjersum)	Succeeded by award discontinued
