= Torbjørn Færøvik =

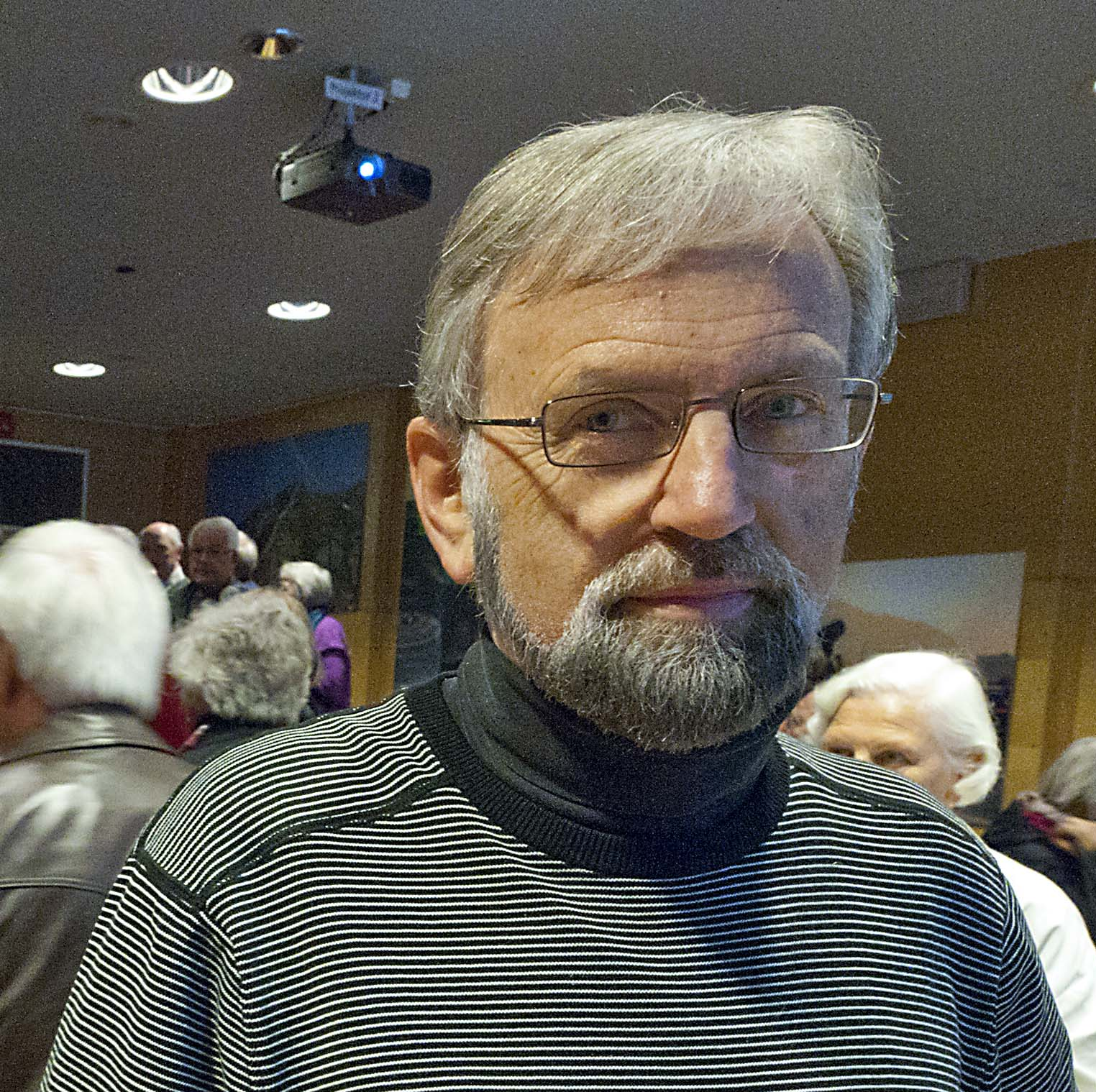
- Torbjørn Færøvik in 2012
- Born: 8 June 1948 (age 77)
- Occupations: Historian, journalist, non-fiction writer
- Awards: Brage Prize (1999, 2003, 2006); Cappelen Prize

Torbjørn Færøvik (born 8 June 1948) is a Norwegian historian, journalist and non-fiction writer.

He is a three-time recipient of the Brage Prize, and also the last recipient of the Cappelen Prize.

Awards
Preceded by Leif Ryvarden; Klaus Høiland	Recipient of the Brage Prize for prose 1999	Succeeded by Johan Galtung
Preceded by Synne Sun Løes	Recipient of the Brage Prize, open class 2003	Succeeded by Arne Lygre
Preceded by none in 2005	Recipient of the Cappelen Prize; 2006 (with Erik Fosnes Hansen)	Succeeded by discontinued
Preceded by Simen Ekern	Recipient of the Brage Prize for prose 2012	Succeeded by Steffen Kverneland
