= Karl Grossmann =

Karl Grossmann may refer to:

- Karl Grossman, American professor of journalism
- Carl Großmann (1863–1922), German serial killer
- Karol Grossmann (1864–1929), Austro-Hungarian film pioneer

== See also ==
- Karl Rossmann
- Kari Grossmann
