= Anja Røyne =

Norwegian physicist and popular science writer (born 1981)

Anja Røyne (born 1981) is a Norwegian physicist and popular science writer.

She graduated with a bachelor's degree from the Norwegian University of Life Sciences in 2003, a master's degree in physics from the University of Sydney in 2005, and a PhD at the University of Oslo in 2011. She was hired as a lecturer at the University of Oslo, teaching physics and science communication.

Having kept a science blog, she made her non-fiction writing debut with Menneskets grunnstoffer, a popular science book about the elements present in humans, published by Kagge Forlag in 2018. The book earned her a Brage Prize in the open class.

She followed with the book Varm klode, kaldt hode. Løsninger på klimakrisen (2020) about solutions to the climate crisis, as well as the physics textbooks Fysikk - enkelt forklart (2020) and Klimaendringer - enkelt forklart (2023), both on Universitetsforlaget. Varm klode, kaldt hode received positive reviews.

Awards
Preceded by Cecilie Løveid	Recipient of the Brage Prize, open class 2018	Succeeded by Martin Ernstsen
