= Annette Münch =

Norwegian writer

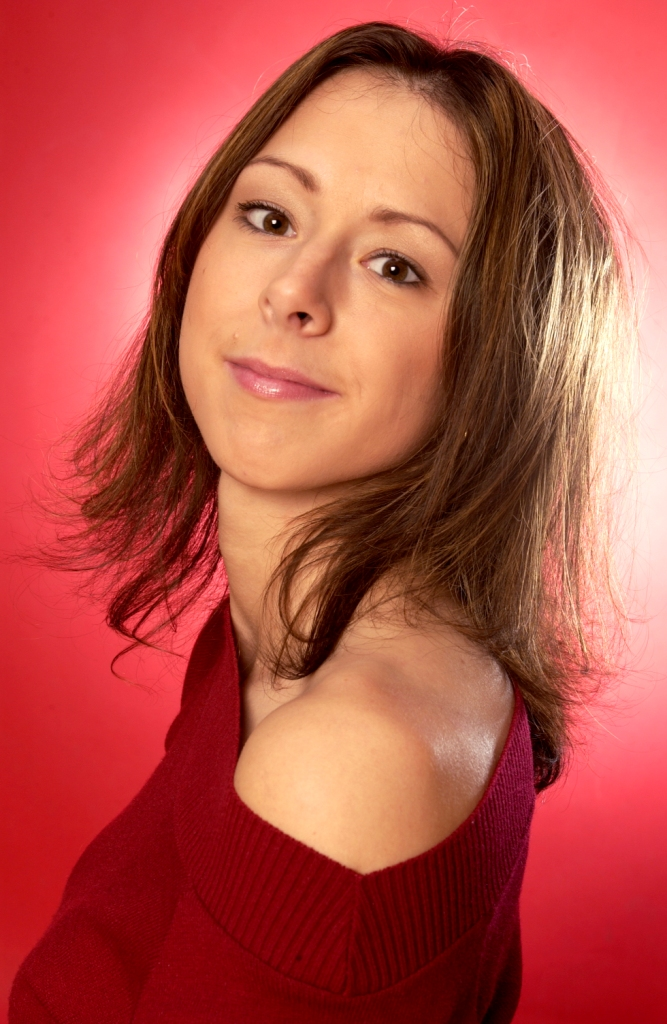
- Münch c.2006
- Born: 10 January 1981 (age 45); Oslo, Norway
- Occupations: children's writer, playwright and non-fiction writer
- Awards: Brage Prize (2014)

Annette Münch (born 10 January 1981) is a Norwegian children's writer, playwright and non-fiction writer.

== Biography ==
Born in Oslo on 10 January 1981, Münch made her literary debut in 2006 with Kaoskrigeren. Further books are Jenteloven from 2009, and Badboy Steroid from 2014. A 2nd dan black belt in taekwondo, she is cowriter of the instruction book Den ultimate guiden til kampsport from 2012.

She was awarded the Brage Prize in 2014 for the young adult's book Badboy Steroid.

== Selected works ==
- Kaoskrigeren. 2006. (young adult's book)
- Jenteloven. 2009. (young adult's book)
- Kampsport. 2012. (non-fiction)
- Drop Out. 2012. (play, staged at Lillestrøm Kulturscene)
- Badboy Steroid. 2014. (young adult's book)
