= Marita Fossum =

Norwegian writer (born 1965)

- Born: 14 March 1965 (age 61)
- Occupation: Writer
- Awards: Brage Prize (2005)

Marita Fossum (born 14 March 1965) is a Norwegian writer.

== Life and career ==
Fossum was born on 14 March 1965. Her literary debut was the novel Verden utenfor from 2002. Her novel Å drepe en drage (2004) deals with the tragedy of losing a child. She was awarded the Brage Prize in 2005 for the novel Forestill deg. In 2006 she wrote the childhood story Kjære Gjetergutt.

== Awards ==
- Tanums Kvinnestipend 2005
- Brage Prize 2005
