= Monica Isakstuen =

Norwegian writer from Fredrikstad

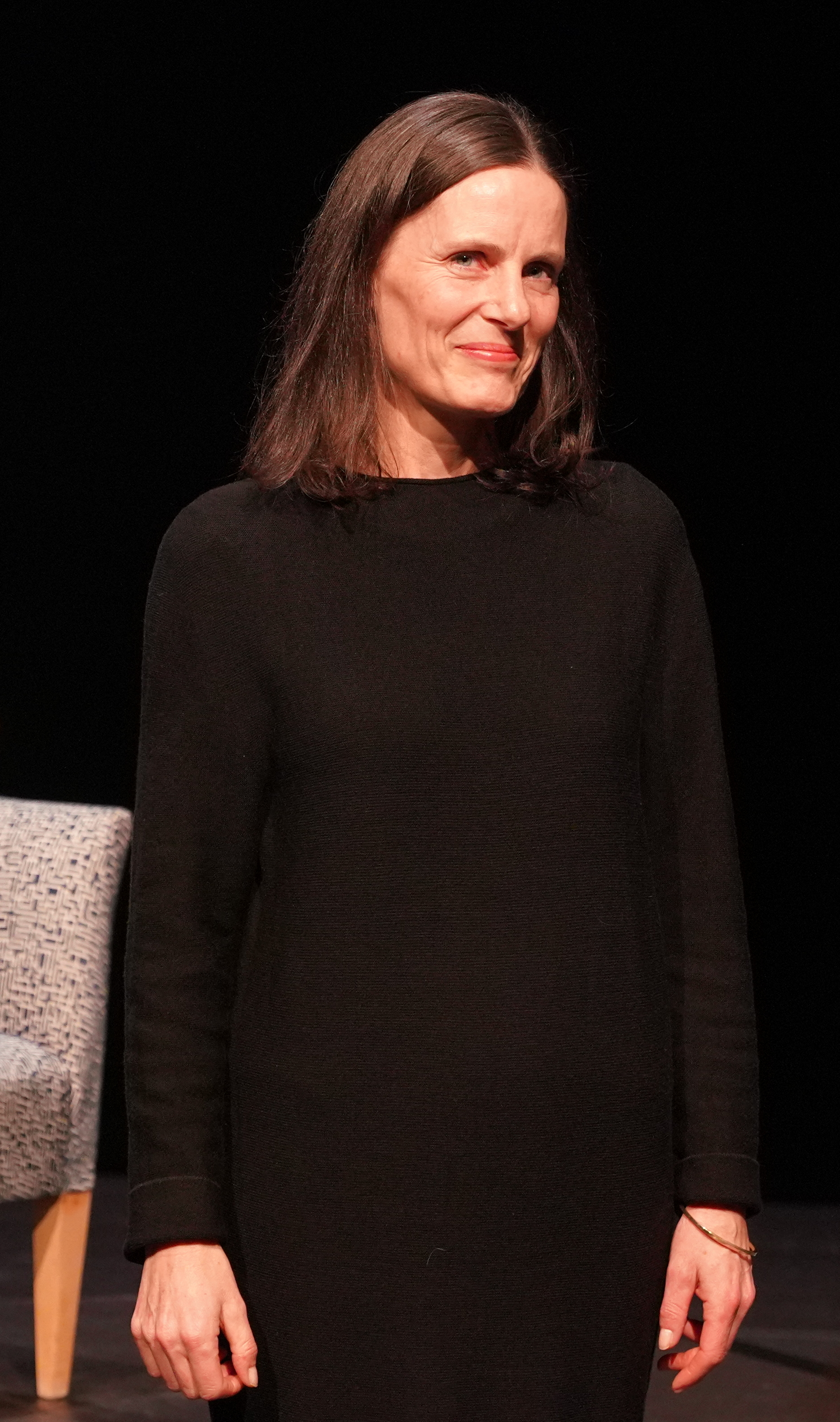
- 2025.
- Born: 19 October 1976 (age 49)
- Occupation: Poet; Novelist; Playwright
- Awards: Brage Prize (2016)

Monica Isakstuen (born 19 October 1976) is a Norwegian writer from Fredrikstad. She made her literary debut in 2008 with the poetry collection Sånn, borte (English: "Like that, gone"). In 2009 she released her first novel, Avstand ("Distance"), in 2011 the poetry collection Alltid nyheter ("Always news"), and in 2014 the novel Om igjen ("About again"). She was awarded the Brage Prize for 2016, for her novel Vær snill med dyrene ("Be kind to the animals"). In 2018 she released the play Se på meg når jeg snakker til deg. Her later novels are Rase (2018), and Mine venner (2021).
