= Linn T. Sunne =

Norwegian children's writer (born 1971)

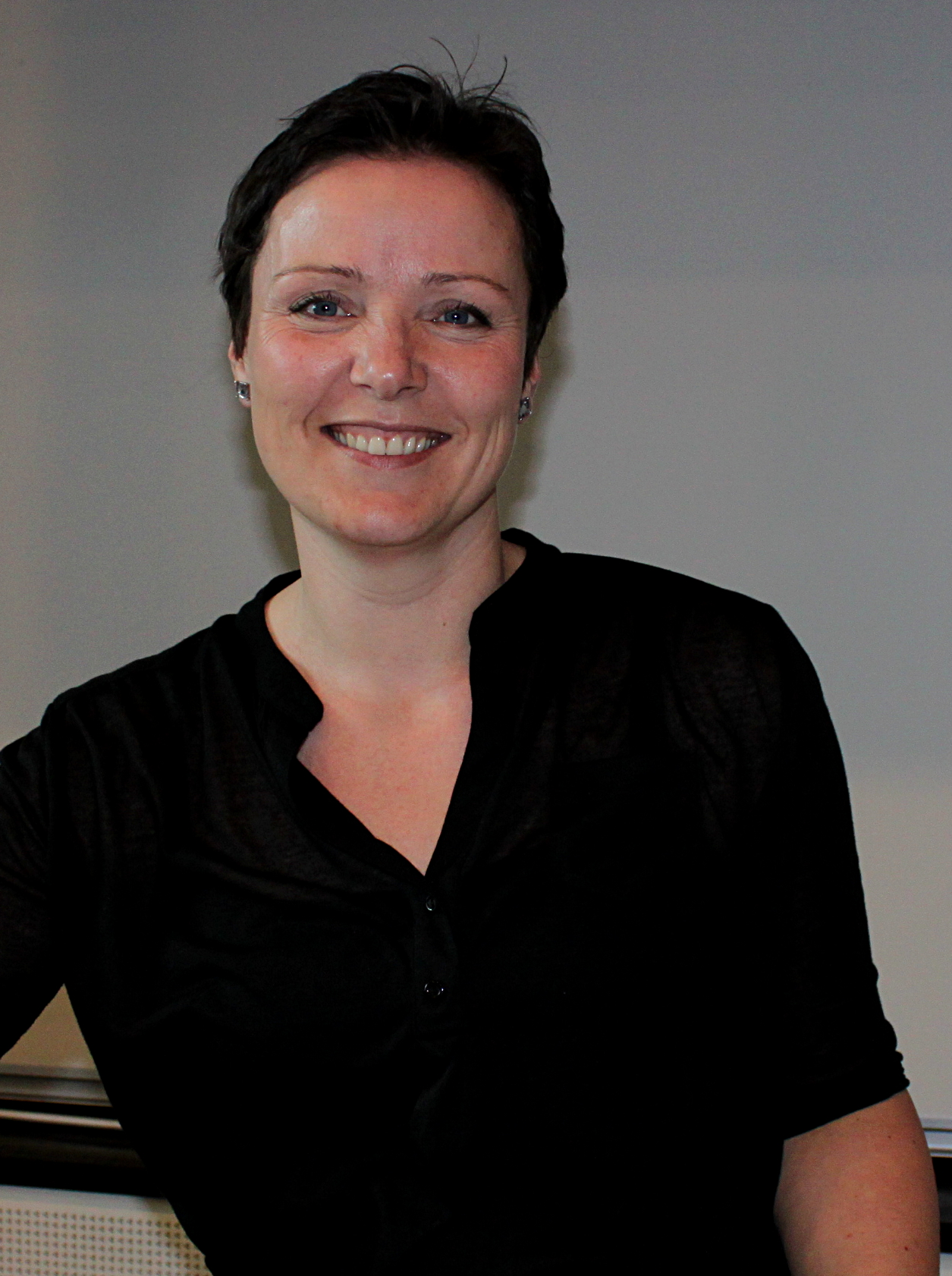
- Sunne in 2012
- Born: Linn Tormodsdatter Grøndahl Sunne; 2 December 1971 (age 53); Kongsberg, Norway
- Education: Schoolteacher
- Occupation: children's writer
- Awards: Brage Prize (2007, 2012)

Linn Tormodsdatter Grøndahl Sunne (born 2 December 1971) is a Norwegian children's writer, schoolteacher and local politician. She won the Brage Prize in 2007 and 2012.

== Career ==
Born in Kongsberg Municipality on 2 December 1971, Sunne resides in Dokka. She made her literary debut in 2000. She was awarded the Brage Prize in 2007 for the children's book Happy. In 2012 she again received the Brage Prize, for the children's book Lille ekorn.

Sunne was educated as a teacher at Oslo University College in 1995, and spent the next eleven years as a lower secondary school teacher. She was also a screenwriter for Hotel Cæsar between 2003 and 2005. Becoming involved in politics for the Labour Party, she was elected to the municipal council for Nordre Land Municipality and served as deputy mayor from 2019. In 2024 she left the Labour Party as a protest against the party's proposal of closing down several schools in her county.
