= Arne Lygre =

Norwegian novelist and playwright (born 1968)

- Born: 6 February 1968 (age 58); Bergen, Norway
- Occupation: Writer
- Awards: Brage Prize (2004)

Arne Lygre (born 6 February 1968) is a Norwegian novelist and playwright. Among his plays are Mamma og meg og menn from 1998, staged at Rogaland Teater, and Brått og evig from 1999, first staged at the National Theatre (Oslo). He was awarded the Brage Prize in 2004 for the short story collection Tid inne. His first novel was Et siste ansikt in 2006. From 2014 to 2016 he is the in-house playwright at the National Theatre.

He was awarded the Dobloug Prize in 2025.

Awards
Preceded by Torbjørn Færøvik	Recipient of the Brage Prize, open class 2004	Succeeded by Jason
