= Annie Riis =

Norwegian writer (1927–2020)

Annie Riis (29 October 1927 – 26 February 2020) was a Norwegian poet, novelist and children's writer.

She made her literary debut in 1975 with the poetry collection Satura. Among her other collections are Mellom høye trær from 1979 and Satirens tid from 1994. She was awarded the Brage Prize (open class) in 2001 for the poetry collection Himmel av stål and the Herman Wildenvey Poetry Award in 2002.

Among her novels are Azoras hus from 1988 and Fridafrank from 1991. She wrote several children's books.

She died in February 2020 at the age of 92.

Awards
Preceded by Karin Fossum	Recipient of the Brage Prize, open class 2001	Succeeded by Synne Sun Løes
