= Gaute Heivoll =

Norwegian writer (b. 1978)

- Born: 13 March 1978 (age 48)
- Occupation: Writer
- Awards: Brage Prize (2010)

Gaute Heivoll (born 13 March 1978) is a Norwegian poet, novelist, playwright and short story writer.

He made his literary debut in 2002 with the short story collection Liten dansende gutt. Among his novels are Omars siste dager from 2003 and Ungdomssangen from 2005.

He was awarded the Brage Prize in 2010 for the novel Før jeg brenner ned, translated into English as Before I Burn, and praised highly by Charles Larson in CounterPunch.

His novel Himmelens krystall earned him the award Lytternes romanpris for 2025. The novel is set at the countryside of Aust-Agder in the late 1800s and early 1900s and deals with the ordinary life of a rural postman.

Awards
Preceded by Karl Ove Knausgård	Recipient of the Brage Prize for fiction 2010	Succeeded by Tomas Espedal
