= Frank Rossavik =

Norwegian journalist and writer (born 1965)

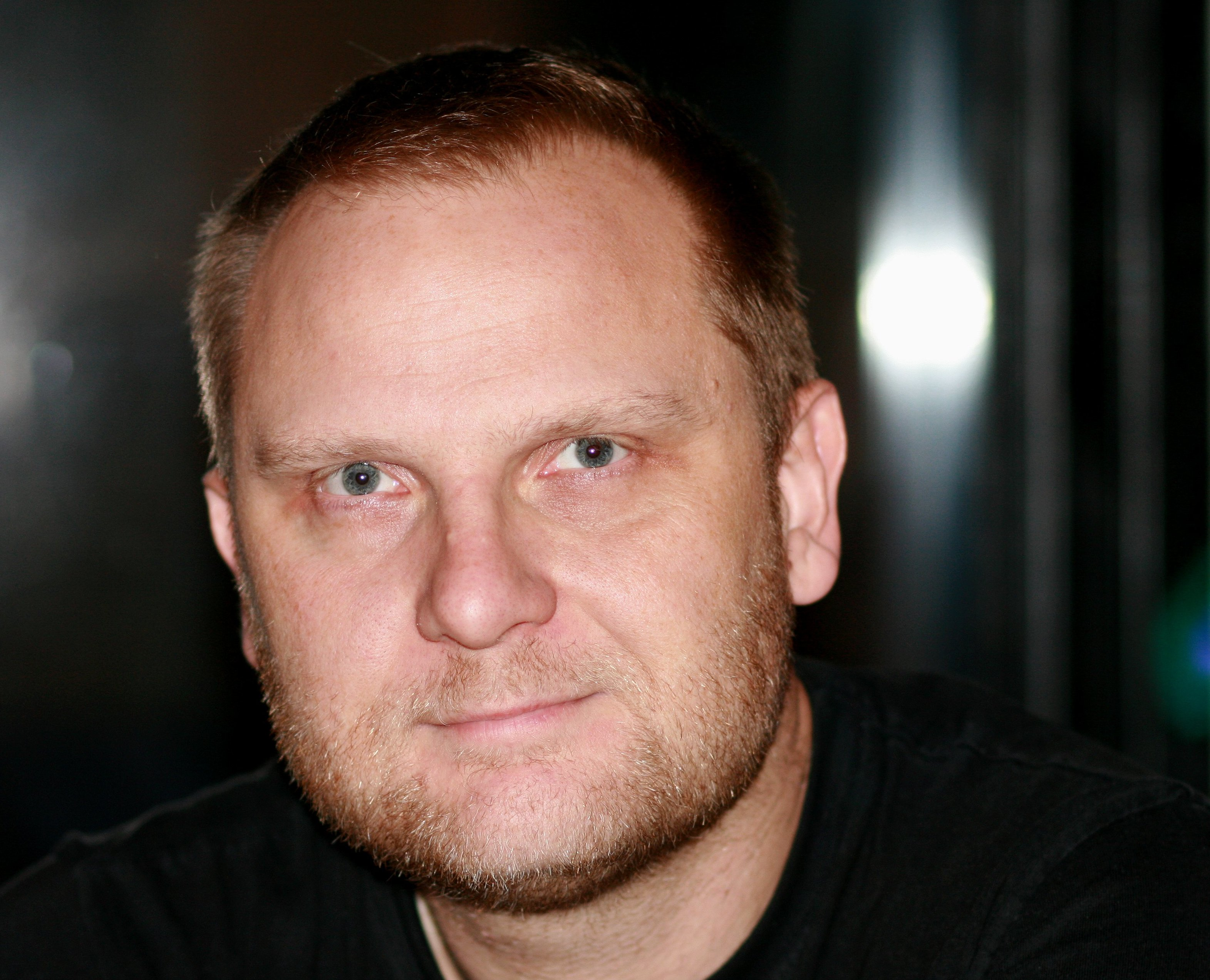
Frank Rossavik, 2007.

Frank Rossavik (born 21 December 1965) is a Norwegian journalist and writer.

Rossavik graduated from the University of Bergen in 1986 with a bachelor's degree in comparative politics. In 2004 he took the master's degree in international politics from the Centre Européen de Recherches Internationales et Stratégiques. He worked as a journalist in Rogalands Avis from 1987 to 1988, before being hired as press secretary for the Socialist Left Party. He left in 1990. He worked as a journalist in Bladet Tromsø in 1990 and Vårt Land from 1991 to 1992, and then as information director in the European Movement Norway from 1992 to 1995 and information consultant in Gambit the next year. He worked as a journalist in Bergens Tidende from 1996 to 2009, and then became an editor in Morgenbladet. In 2012 he returned to Bergens Tidende, where he became political editor i 2013. Since 1 January 2016 he works as a chief foreign affairs commentator for Aftenposten.

He has written eleven books, including the 2007 biography on Einar Førde for which he won the Brage Prize.

In May 2026, Rossavik wrote an opinion piece in Aftenposten about Indian Prime Minister Narendra Modi that was accompanied by a cartoon portraying Modi as a snake charmer. The cartoon and article prompted backlash on social media and in Indian media, where commentators and politicians accused Rossavik and Aftenposten of racism and of using colonial‑era stereotypes in its depiction of Modi and India. Aftenposten defended the publication as political satire and an example of press freedom, while critics argued that such imagery would not be acceptable if used against Western leaders or minorities.

Awards
Preceded by Bent Sofus Tranøy	Recipient of the Brage Prize for prose 2007	Succeeded by Bjørn Westlie
