= Hunger (graphic novel) =

Graphic novel by Martin Ernstsen

Hunger (Sult)
- Date: 2019
- Page count: 224 pages
- Publisher: Minuskel forlag

Creative team
- Writer: Martin Ernstsen, based on Hunger by Knut Hamsun
- Artist: Martin Ernstsen
- ISBN: 9788292796702

Hunger (Norwegian: Sult) is a graphic novel by Martin Ernstsen, based on the novel Hunger by Knut Hamsun. It is about a struggling and starving artist who wanders the streets of late 19th-century Christiania. The comic book was published in Norwegian by Minuskel forlag in 2019. It was well received by critics and received the Brage Prize in the open class.
