= Martin Ernstsen =

Norwegian comics artist

Martin Ernstsen (born 16 August 1982) is a Norwegian comics artist.

He issued his first comic on Jippi Comics in 2007, publishing seven titles until 2014. He then penned two children's books on Cappelen Damm, Hvor er Albert? (2013) and Filip flipper ut (2015). In 2019 he issued the graphic novel Sult (English: Hunger), an adaptation of Knut Hamsun's Hunger. For this he won the Brage Prize, open class, the same year.

Awards
Preceded by Anja Røyne	Recipient of the Brage Prize, open class 2019	Succeeded by Thomas Horne
