= Ivo de Figueiredo =

Norwegian historian and biographer (born 1966)

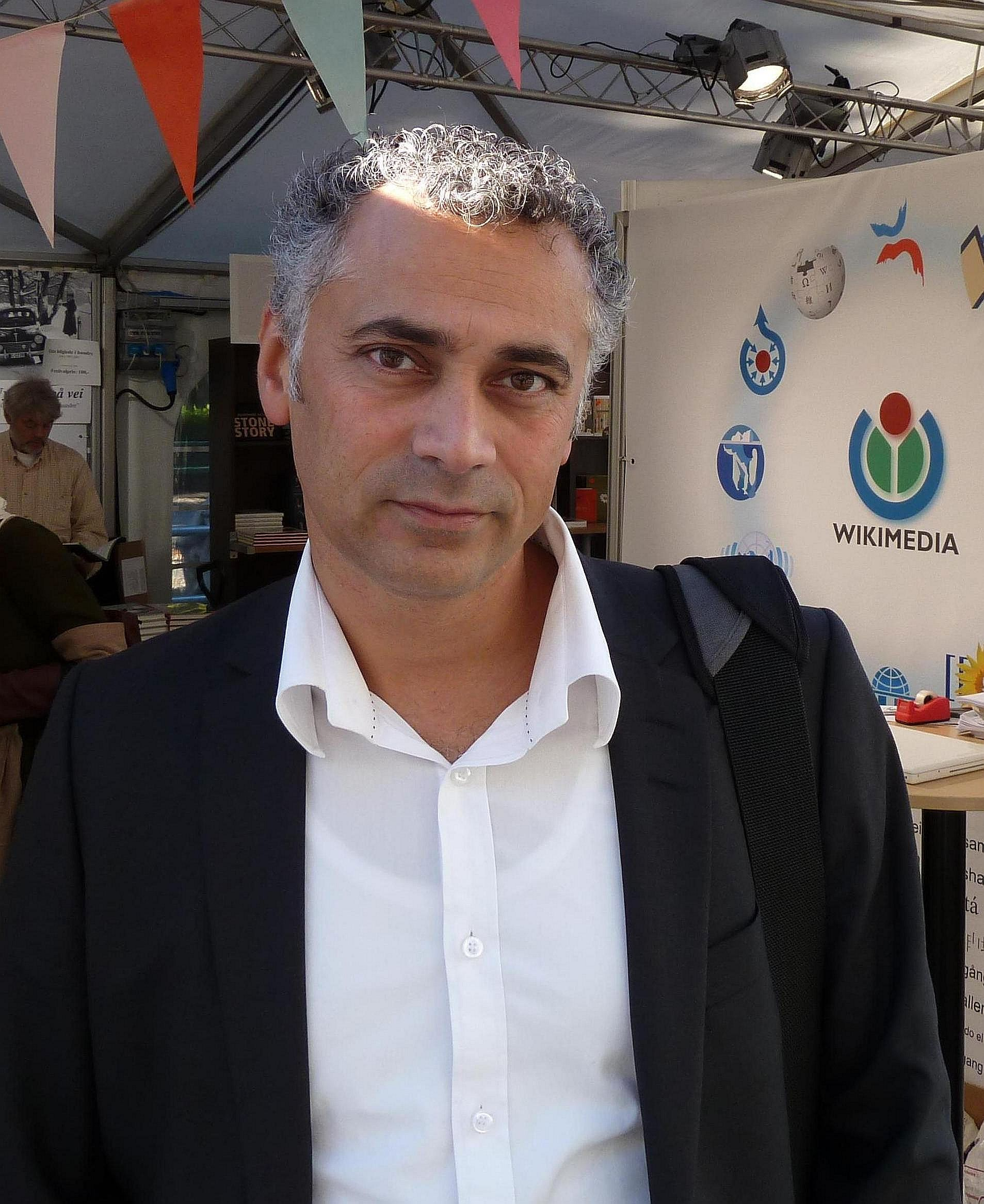
- De Figueiredo in 2010
- Born: 30 April 1966 (age 60)
- Education: University of Oslo (cand.philol.)
- Occupations: Historian; biographer; literary critic
- Awards: Brage Prize (2002)

Ivo de Figueiredo (born 30 April 1966) is a Norwegian historian, biographer and literary critic. He is the recipient of the Brage Prize in 2002 for his biography on Johan Hjort.

== Education ==
De Figueiredo graduated as cand.philol. from the University of Oslo in 1994.

== Career ==
De Figueiredo was awarded the Brage Prize in 2002, for a biography of supreme court lawyer Johan Bernhard Hjort. He has written several books on playwright and theatre director Henrik Ibsen and his works. Ibsen scholar Ellen Rees describes de Figueiredo's two-volume biography of the Norwegian playwright as a "groundbreaking" work which spearheaded a "revolution in historical and biographical research into Ibsen's life". The work was published in English translation in one volume under the title Henrik Ibsen: The Man and the Mask in 2019.

In 2023, de Figueiredo published the book Stormen I, the first volume of a biography of the painter Edvard Munch.

== Personal life ==
De Figueiredo hails from Langesund, Norway. He is of Goan descent.
