= Karsten Alnæs =

Norwegian novelist

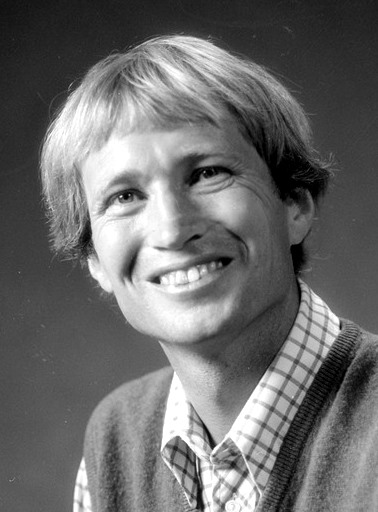
- Born: 29 May 1938 (age 88); Hønefoss, Norway
- Education: University of Oslo
- Occupations: Historian, journalist and literary scholar
- Awards: Brage Prize (1992); Dobloug Prize (1998)

Karsten Alnæs (born 29 May 1938) is a Norwegian author, historian, and journalist, who has dual degrees in history and literature from the University of Oslo. He worked as a journalist and taught at the Norwegian School of Journalism. His bibliography includes 15 novels, 3 children’s books, a collection of novellas, and a number of non–fiction works.

Alnæs was awarded the Brage Prize in 1992 for the novel Trollbyen, and the honorary prize in 2003 for the cultural impact of his literary work. He received the Dobloug Prize in 1998.

His series The History of Norway (5 volumes; 1996–2000) received the Sverre Steen Prize of the Norwegian Historical Society and topped the bestseller list for non–fiction in Norway. It became the basis of a TV-series, with Alnæs as host and director. His book series The History of Europe (4 volumes; 2003–2006) has been translated into several languages.

Alnæs was twice elected president of the Norwegian Authors' Association 1985–1987 and 1999–2001, and has been active in PEN International. He is a speaker on the international lecture circuit and serves as the lone representative for the Scandinavian countries on the European Cultural Parliament.

He was born in Hønefoss, and is a cand.philol. by education.

== Bibliography ==
- 1971 Roles and Patterns in Mass Media. Non–Fiction. Journalism. [Roller og mønstre in massemedia]*
- 1971 On Access to Language. Non–Fiction. Journalism. [Om språklig tilgjengelighet]
- 1973 Language and Mass Media. Non–Fiction. [Språk og massemedier]
- 1975 Wasps. Short Stories. [Veps – noveller]
- 1976 The Campaign. Historical Novel. [Felttoget]
- 1977 Gaia. Novel.
- 1978 Lord of the Ocean, Serf of the Sea. Historical Novel. [Havherre og sjøtrell]
- 1981 Big Bang and Blue Days. Novel. Kjempesmell og blå dager - roman
- 1982 The Retinue of Fleeing Kings. Novel [Flyktende kongers følge]
- 1983 Come Love. Novel. [Kom kjærlighet]
- 1984 The History of Norway and the World Before 1850. Non–Fiction. Textbook for upper secondary school. [Norges- og verdenshistorie før 1850.]
- 1985 Island. Novel. [Øy]
- 1986 The Sea Monster. A Narrative. [Sjøgossen]
- 1986 The Green Land. Children’s book. [Det grøne landet]
- 1989 The Boy From Duck River. Historical Novel. [Even 1814]
- 1992 The Magic City. Novel. [Trollbyen]
- 1993 A Peculiar City. Non–Fiction. Coauthor of Anthology on Oslo. [Den forunderlige by]
- 1994 Sabina. Novel.
- 1996 There is a Land. The History of Norway. Vol. 1. [Det ligger et land. Historien om Norge 1]
- 1997 Under Foreign Rule. The History of Norway. Vol. 2. [Under fremmed styre. Historien om Norge 2]
- 1998 Toward Modern Times. The History of Norway. Vol. 3. [Mot moderne tider. Historien om Norge 3]
- 1999 Toward a New Working Day. The History of Norway. Vol. 4. [En ny arbeidsdag. Historien om Norge 4]
- 2000 Barcelona. A Catalan Fireworks. A Cultural Guide. [Barcelona. Et katalansk fyrverkeri]
- 2000 Fifty Rich Years. The History of Norway. Vol. 5. [Femti rike år. Historien om Norge]
- 2001 The History of Norway in Story and Picture. [Historien om Norge i bilder og fortellinger]
- 2002 Lisbon. A Travel Diary.
- 2002 A Stranger. Novel. [En fremmed]
- 2003 The History of Norway. An Instructional Guide. [Historien om Norge – spørrebok]
- 2003 The History of Europe I, 1300–1600. [Historien om Europa 1 (1300–1600)]
- 2004 The History of Europe II, 1600–1800. [Historien om Europa 2 (1600–1800)]
- 2005 The History of Europe III, 1800–1900. [Historien om Europa 3 (1800–1900)]
- 2006 The History of Europe IV, 1900–1945. [Historien om Europa 4 (1900–1945)]
- 2007 Strapping My Skis. Cultural History. [Jeg spenner mine ski]
- 2008 Back Behind All Colors. Novel. [Bakenfor all farger]
- 2009 Sophie, Don’t Die! Historical Novel. [Ikke dø, Sophie!]

Note: Norwegian titles are given in brackets

== Awards ==
- 1992 The Brage Prize for The Magic City [Trollbyen].
- 1992 The Norwegian Booksellers' Prize for The Magic City.
- 1998 The Dobloug Prize.
- 2000 The Sverre Steen Prize of the Norwegian Historical Association.
- 2003 The Honorary Brage Prize.

Cultural offices
Preceded by Johannes Heggland	Chair of the Norwegian Authors' Union; 1985–1987	Succeeded by Toril Brekke
Preceded by Inger Elisabeth Hansen	Chair of the Norwegian Authors' Union; 1999–2001	Succeeded by Geir Pollen
