= Synne Sun Løes =

Norwegian novelist and children's writer (born 1975)

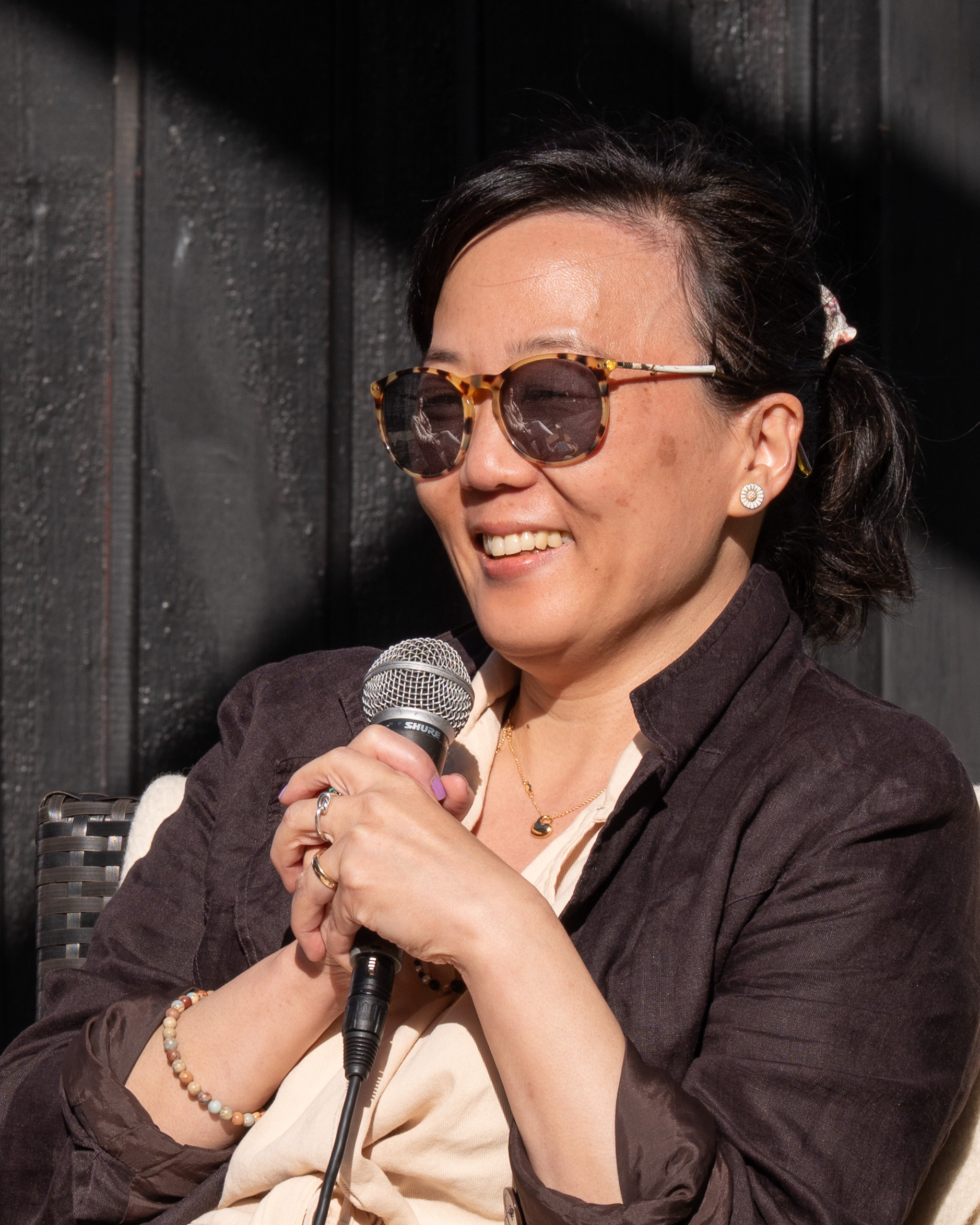
- Synne Sun Løes (2022)
- Born: 30 May 1975 (age 51); South Korea
- Occupations: novelist and children's writer
- Awards: Brage Prize (2002)

Synne Sun Løes (born 30 May 1975) is a Norwegian novelist and children's writer. She made her literary debut in 1999 with the novel Yoko er alene. She was awarded the Brage Prize in 2002 for the children's book Å spise blomster til frokost.

Awards
Preceded by Annie Riis	Recipient of the Brage Prize, open class 2002	Succeeded by Torbjørn Færøvik
