= Arne Svingen =

Norwegian writer

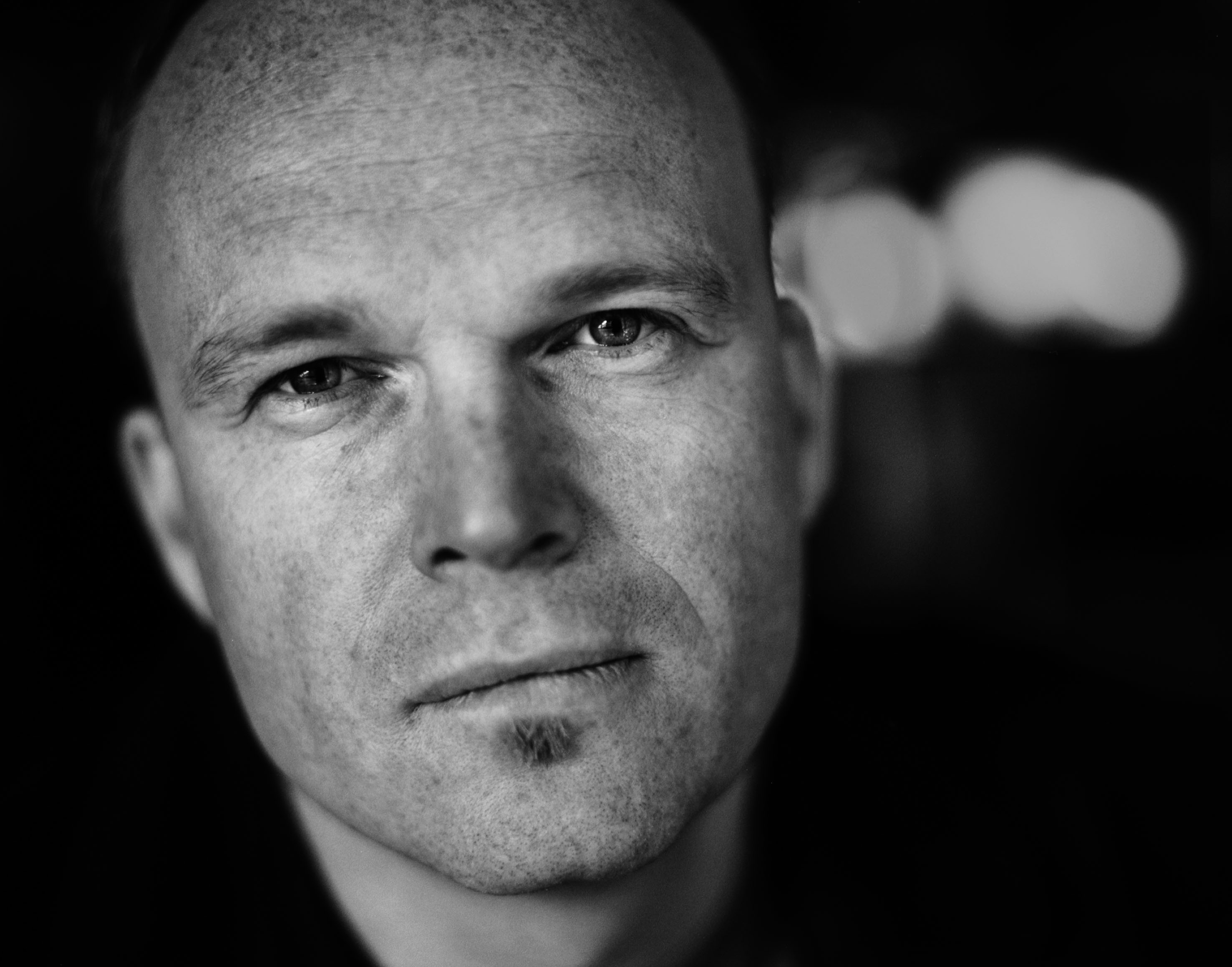
Arne Svingen

Arne Svingen (born 10 July 1967) is a Norwegian writer of children's books. He also writes adult fiction and books for young adults and adults. He has published over a hundred titles and his works have been translated into more than 25 languages.

Svingen hails from Grorud and was a journalist before becoming a full-time children's writer in 1997.

Svingen is the International Secretary in PEN International (elected for 2024-2029).

His most noted books are:

- Svart elfenben, winner of the Brageprisen in 2005
- Sangen om en brukket nese, winner of the Kulturdepartementets litteraturpris in 2012, Prix Libbylit Romans Ados in 2015, and the Batchelder Honor Book Award in 2017
- Man dør litt hver dag, winner of the Østfoldungdommens kritikerpris in 2017
- podcast Svingens barnebokverden, winner of the NBU-prisen in 2018
- En himmel full av skyer, winner of the Bokslukerprisen in 2019/20

== Bibliometrics ==
Throughout his career, Arne Svingen has published:

- 1999: 2 books
- 2000: 3 books
- 2001: 4 books
- 2002: 4 books
- 2003: 1 book
- 2004: 4 books
- 2005: 5 books
- 2006: 3 books
- 2007: 3 books
- 2008: 1 book
- 2009: 2 books
- 2010: 4 books
- 2011: 5 books
- 2012: 9 books
- 2013: 9 books
- 2014: 5 books
- 2015: 6 books
- 2016: 7 books
- 2017: 9 books
- 2018: 6 books
- 2019: 5 books and 1 anthology
- 2020: 7 books
- 2021: 8 books
- 2022: 6 books
- 2023: 7 books

The vast majority of the books are published by Gyldendal Norsk Forlag, some by Cappelen Damm (formerly Damm) as well as three in his early career by Solum.
