= Rune Christiansen =

Norwegian poet and novelist (born 1963)

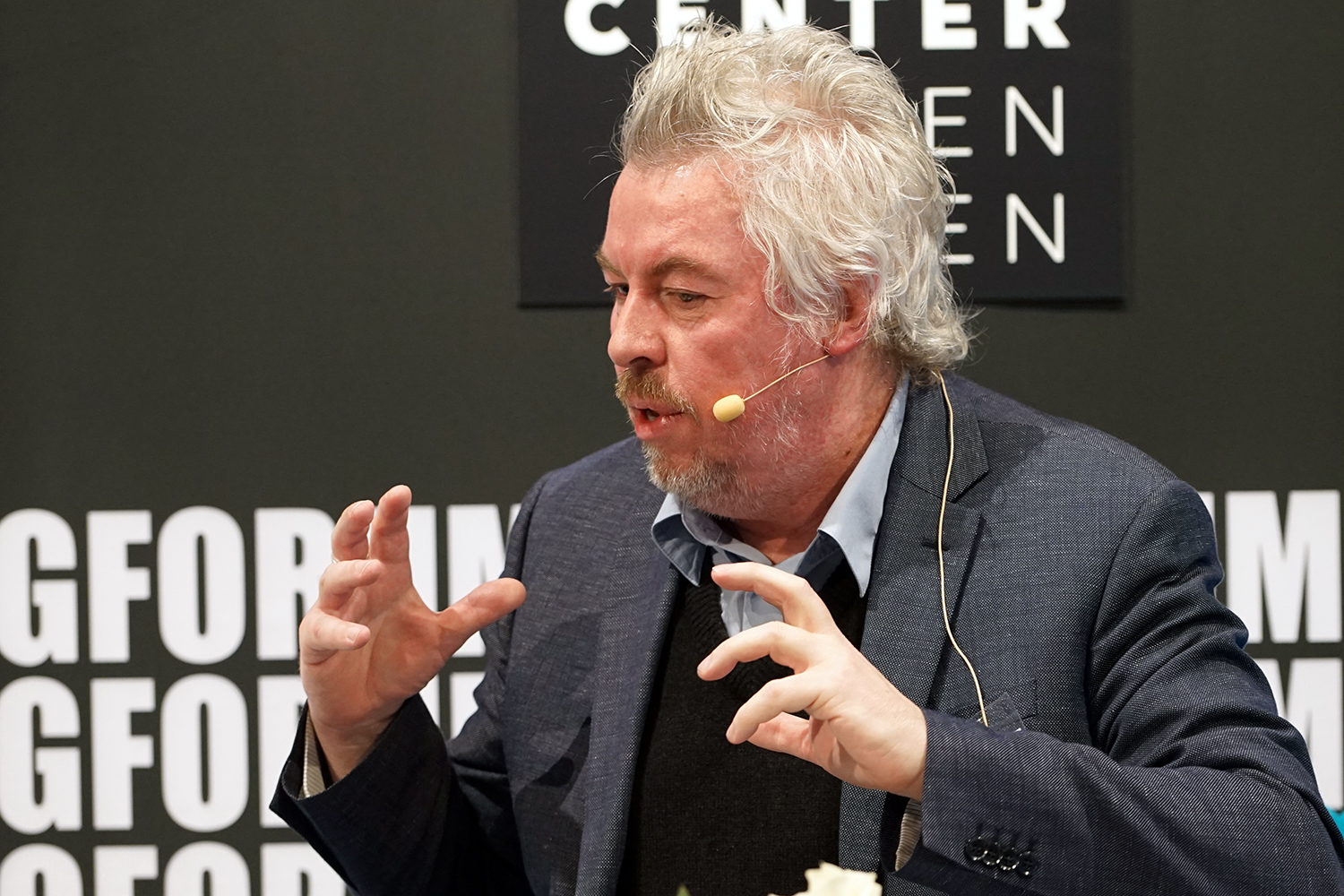
Rune Christiansen (2015)

Rune Christiansen (born 10 April 1963 in Bergen) is a Norwegian poet and novelist. He is a professor of creative writing at Telemark University College. He won the Brage Prize in 2014 and the Gyldendal lifetime award in 2015.

Rune Christiansen debuted as a poet in 1986. Since then, he has written twelve collections of poems, and nine novels. He has also translated Alain Bosquet, Eugenio Montale, Frank Kuppner and Edmond Jabès.

He grew up at Østerås and resides in Vestfossen.

== Bibliography ==
- 1986: Hvor toget forlater havet, poem
- 1987: Sanger fra måneraketten, poem
- 1989: I dødvanne, poem
- 1990: Hvalene i Glasgow, novel
- 1991: Skilpaddedøgn, poem
- 1992: Dypt mørke, novel
- 1993: En følsom tid, poem
- 1994: Motormelkeveien, poem
- 1996: Anticamera, poem (ed. it. AntiCamera, Lavìs 2015)
- 1997: Steve McQueen er død, novel
- 1999: Etter alltid, poem
- 2000: På ditt aller vakreste, novel
- 2002: Om trær som vokser seg skakke i trange skyggefulle hager, men som likevel (eller nettopp derfor) gjør inntrykk og som man husker livet ut, poem
- 2002: 25 February , essay
- 2003: Intimiteten, novel.
- 2007: Fraværet av musikk, novel
- 2009: Krysantemum, novel
- 2014: Ensomheten i Lydia Ernemans liv, novel

=== Collections ===
- 1998: Lett ferd: Dikt i utvalg, poem
- 2004: Samlede dikt, poem
