= Øvre Richter Frich =

Norwegian reporter, newspaper editor and crime fiction writer

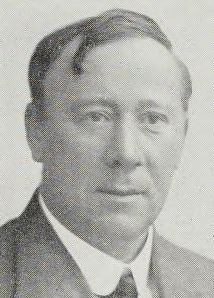
- Born: 24 March 1872; Byneset Municipality, Norway
- Died: 13 May 1945 (aged 73)
- Occupations: reporter, newspaper editor and crime fiction writer

Gjert Øvre Richter Frich (24 March 1872 – 13 May 1945) was a Norwegian reporter, newspaper editor and crime fiction writer. He was one of the most popular writers of crime fiction in Norway during the interwar period.

== Early and personal life ==
Frich was born in Byneset Municipality in Søndre Trondhjem county, Norway. He was the son of parish priest David Christopher Frich and Emilie Christine Richter. He started studying law and later medicine, but did not complete his studies. As a student he excelled as athlete, in boxing, wrestling and rowing. He moved to Kristiania in 1895, and married Olga Marie Hansen in 1897. They had three children. He then left family life, divorced, and married actress and boheme Ida Ajagela Basilier-Magelssen in 1907. Both Frich and his new wife were part of a colorful group of people at the Grand Café in Kristiania. He later spent twenty years travelling around the world, to exotic places like Spitsbergen and South America. He spent his last fifteen years in Sweden, and died in Södertälje in May 1945.

== Journalist ==
Frich was a reporter for Aftenposten from 1895 to 1910. As a reporter he covered the Ålesund Fire in 1904 and the dissolution of the union between Norway and Sweden in 1905, and is, in retrospect, regarded as a renewer of the genre in Norway. He was editor-in-chief for Verdens Gang from 1910 to 1911, and edited Bergens Aftenblad from 1913 to 1914.

== Crime writer ==
Frich made his literary debut in 1911 with the adventurous novel De knyttede næver, the first in a series of books about the hero, Jonas Fjeld. This book was a great success, and from 1913 Frich started travelling around the world, while he continued his writings. He wrote a total of about seventy books, including 21 novels about Jonas Fjeld's adventures. He also issued the documentary Boken om tobakk ("The Tobacco Book", 1934) and several books on wine in Norwegian and Swedish from 1929 to 1938.

His books were translated into nine different languages, and Frich sold at least two million copies of his books.

== See also ==
- Portrayal of Jews in books by Frich
