= Marianne Viermyr =

Norwegian children's author (born 1947)

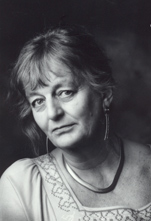

Marianne Viermyr (born 14 January 1947 in Oslo) is a Norwegian children's author. She debuted as an author in 1976 and has written full-time since 1988. She won the Damm Prize in 1989 for Sviktet. She lived in the Østfold for 18 years before she settled in Bærum in 1989.

== Works ==
- Kråkebollen - Aschehoug 1976
- Anne opp og Anne ned - Eide. 1987
- Det hemmelige rommet -Eide. 1988
- Sviktet - Ungdomsbok Damm. 1989
- Sin egen fange - Gyldendal. 1989
- Gjøkungen - Gyldendal. 1991
- En fløyte full av toner - Billedbok Damm. (medforfatter) 1992
- Tro på det umulige! - Gyldendal. 1993
- Dragens Dør - Gyldendal. 1994
- Fløy en liten blåfugl - og en grønn. - Gyldendal. 1995
- Hysj-hysj! - Damm. 1998
- Hjerte-smerte - Damm. 2000
- Jungel - rim og regler - Damm. 2000
- Blodig alvor - - Damm 2002
- Bølla Britt og lille meg - - Damm 2003
- Tusenkunstneren Thorbjørn Egner - - Damm 2003
- Bølla Britt og Rita Rapp - Damm 2006
- Fy katte! - Cappelen 2006
