= Marit Anne Hauan =

Norwegian folklorist and museum leader

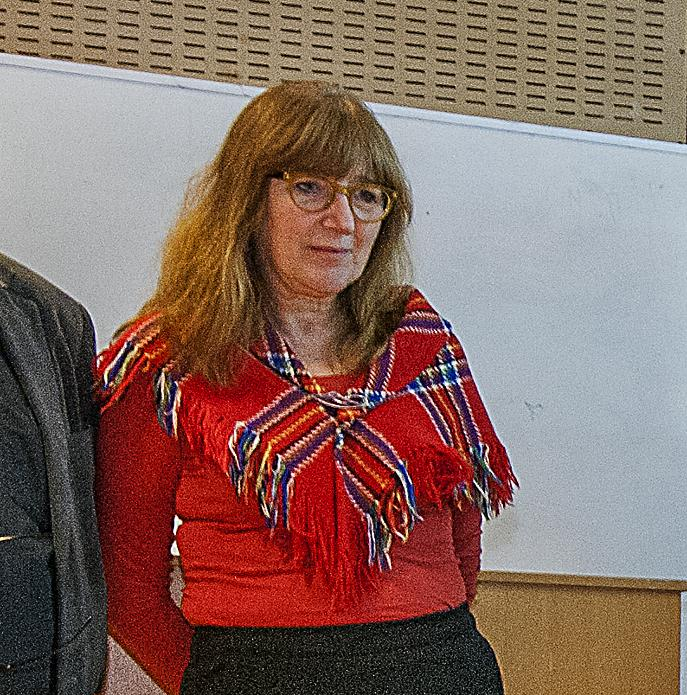
- Born: 1955 (age 70–71)
- Education: Folklorist
- Occupation: Museum leader
- Employer: Tromsø University Museum
- Awards: Brage Prize (1994)

Marit Anne Hauan (born 1955) is a Norwegian folklorist, museum leader and non-fiction writer.

== Life and career ==
Hauan was assigned to the Tromsø Museum from 1985, and was director of the museum from 2005 to 2017. She later assumed a scientific position at Polarmuseet, a branch if Tromsø Museum and part of The Arctic University of Norway. Her research included subjects such as folklore, hunting and cultural identity.

She was awarded the Brage Prize for non-fiction in 1994, for the two-volume work Nordnorsk kulturhistorie jointly with Einar-Arne Drivenes and Helge A. Wold. She issued Polare maskuliniteter. Fra oppdagelsen av Svalbard til heltetidas siste time in 2021.

She is of Sami descent.
