= Dag Olav Hessen =

Norwegian writer and biologist (born 1956)

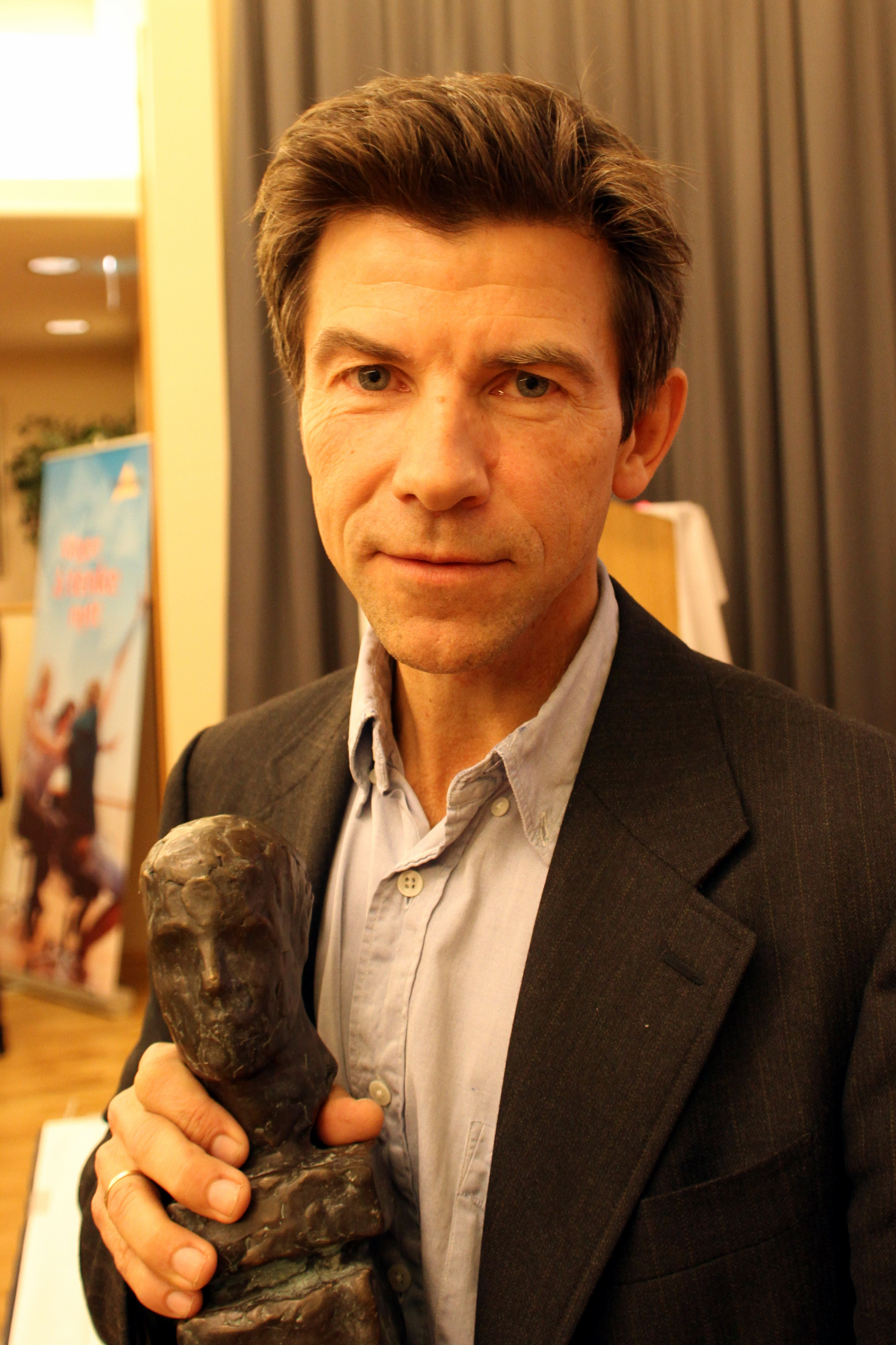
Dag Olav Hessen

Dag Olav Hessen (born 6 July 1956) is a Norwegian writer and biologist, known for his work in the field of ecology.

He is a member of the Norwegian Academy of Science and Letters. He was awarded the Riksmål Society Literature Prize in 2008, and the Fritt Ord Honorary Award in 2010.
