= Simen Ekern =

Norwegian writer and journalist

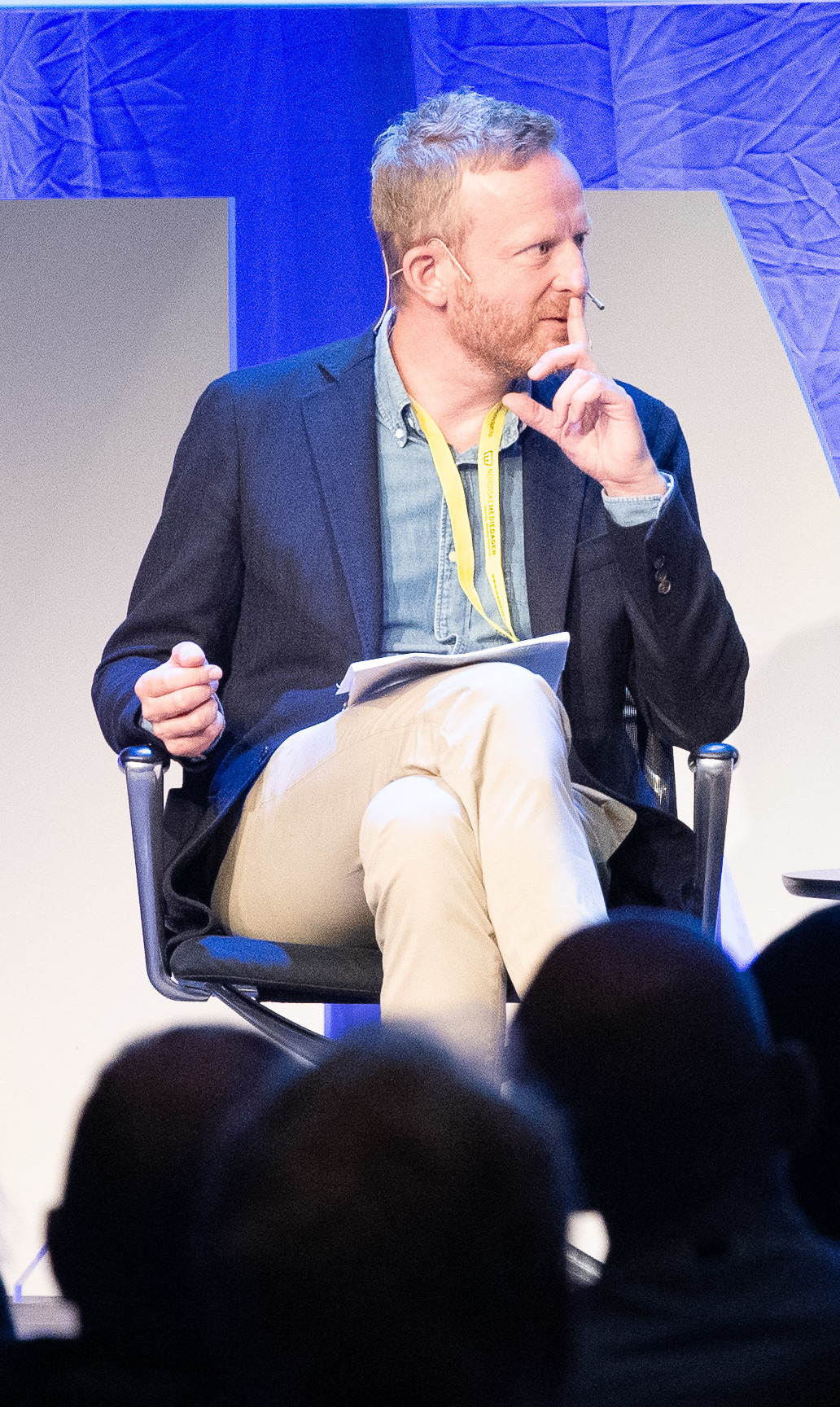
- Born: 1975 (age 50–51)
- Occupations: Journalist, non-fiction writer
- Employer: Dagens Næringsliv
- Awards: Brage Prize (2011)

Simen Ekern (born 1975) is a Norwegian journalist and non-fiction writer. He was awarded the Brage Prize in 2011. Since 2024 he works for the trade magazine Dagens Næringsliv in Oslo.

== Career ==
Educated as historian of ideas, Ekern worked as freelance journalist for various newspapers, including Aftenposten, Verdens Gang, Dagens Næringsliv and Dagbladet. He was subseauently freelancer for the television channel TV 2 and for Morgenbladet.

He made his literary debut in 2006 with the book Berlusconis Italia, about the Italian society. His second book Roma from 2011, treats subcultures in the Italian capital Rome. For this book he was awarded the Brage Prize in 2011. In 2015 he wrote the book Europeere. In 2017 he issued the book Folket det er meg, about populism in Europe.

In 2020 he was appointed as foreign correspondent for NRK in Brussels, succeeding Philip Lote. He left this job in 2024 to begin working for Dagens Næringsliv, a trade magazine in Norway.
