= Tomas Espedal =

Norwegian writer (born 1961)

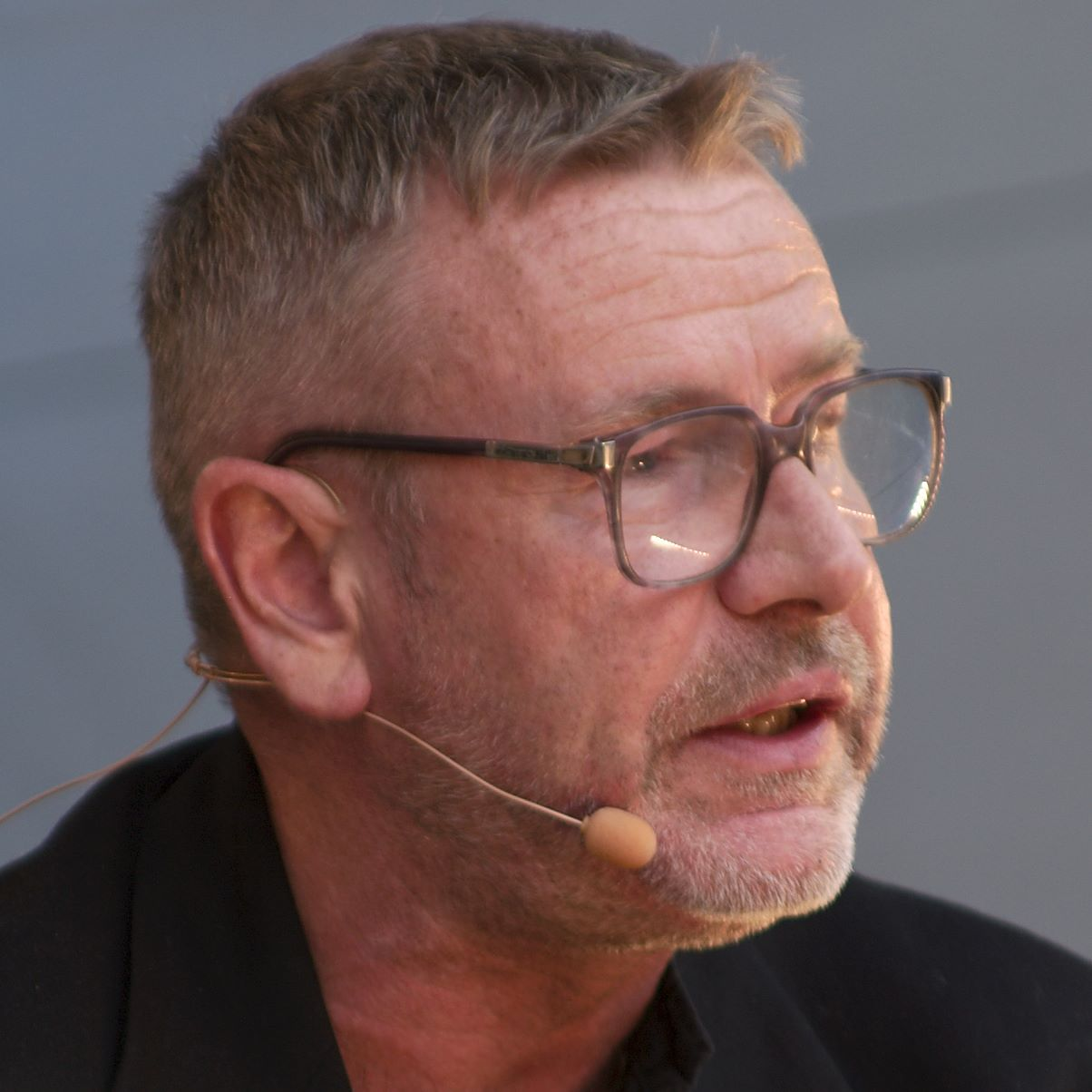
- Tomas Espedal at Oslo bokfestival 2011
- Born: 12 November 1961 (age 64); Bergen, Norway
- Occupation: Writer

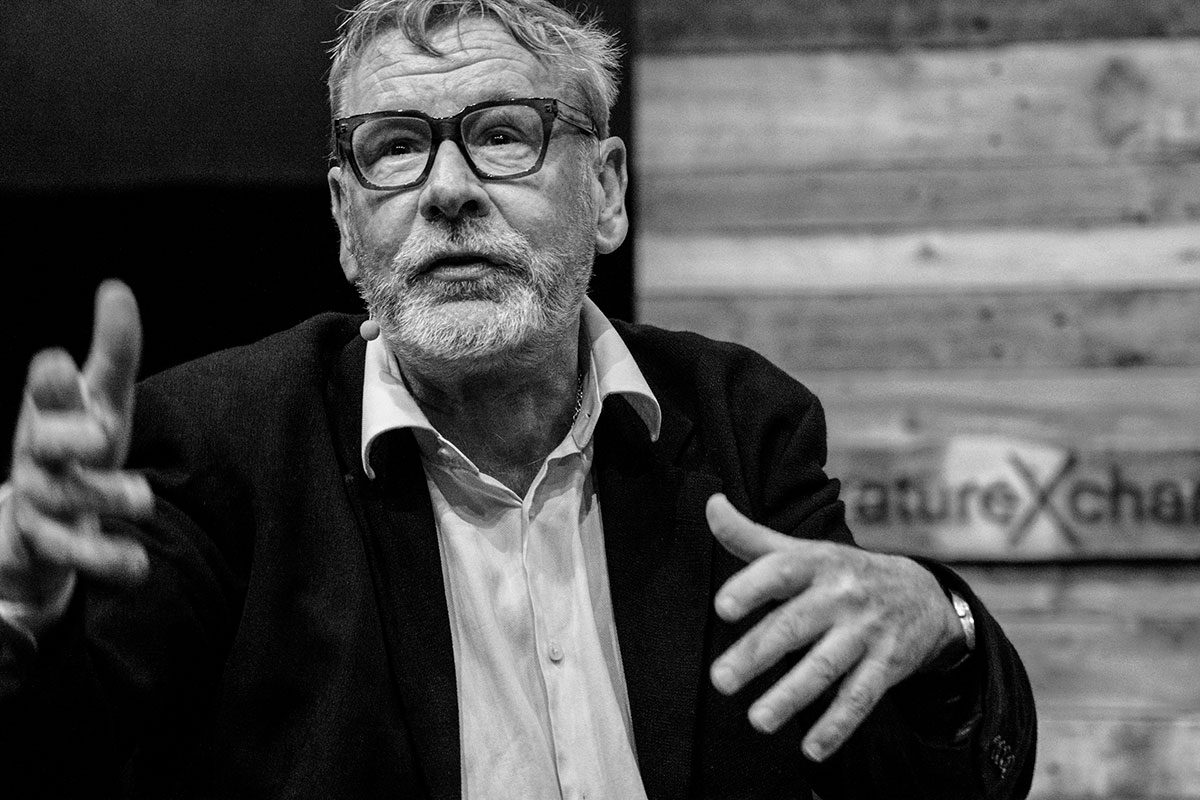
LiteratureXchange Festival Aarhus/Denmark 2022 Hreinn Gudlaugsson

Tomas Espedal (born 12 November 1961) is a Norwegian writer.

Espedal was born in Bergen. He made his literary debut in 1988 with the novel En vill flukt av parfymer. His novel Gå. Eller kunsten å leve et vilt og poetisk liv (English: Go. The Art of Living a Wild and Poetic Life) from 2006 was nominated for the Nordic Council's Literature Prize. He was awarded the Norwegian Critics Prize for Literature for 2009 for his novel Imot kunsten (notatbøkene).

In 2018 he issued the novel Elsken, and he was portrayed in the film Jeg vil bo i mitt navn, directed by Lars Erlend Tubaas Øymo.

== Bibliography ==
- En vill flukt av parfymer. (1988)
- Jeg vil bo i mitt navn. (1990)
- Hun og jeg. (1991)
- Hotel Norge. (1995)
- Blond (erindring). (1996)
- Biografi (glemsel). (1999)
- Dagbok (epitafer). (2003)
- Brev (et forsøk). (2005)
- Gå. Eller kunsten å leve et vilt og poetisk liv. (2006)
- Ly. (2007)
- Imot kunsten. (2009)
- Imot naturen. (2011)
- Bergeners. (2013)
- Mitt privatliv. Liv og kunst. Liv som kunst. (2014)
- Året. (2016)
- Elsken. (2018)

== Awards and nominations ==
- Awarded in the P2/Book Club Novel Competition 1991
- Bergen Prize 2006
- Nominated for the Nordic Council Literature Prize 2006 for "Gå. Kunsten å leve et vilt og poetisk liv" (Go. The Art of Living a Wild and Poetic Life)
- Nominated for the Nordic Council Literature Prize 2009 for "Imot kunsten" (Against Art)
- Critics' Prize 2009, for "Imot kunsten" (Against Art)
- Gyldendal Prize 2009, for "Imot kunsten" (Against Art)
- Brage Prize 2011, for "Imot naturen" (Against Nature)
- Nominated for The International IMPAC Dublin Literary Award 2013
