= Sissel Solbjørg Bjugn =

Norwegian poet and children's writer (1947–2011)

Sissel Solbjørg Bjugn (28 October 1947 – 14 July 2011) was a Norwegian poet and children's writer.

She was born in Bardu Municipality. She made her literary début in 1978 with the book Den første avisa på Lofotveggen, for which she was awarded the Tarjei Vesaas' debutantpris. Her children's book Jente i bitar from 1992 was awarded the Brage Prize.
