= Inger Elisabeth Hansen =

Norwegian poet and translator

Inger Elizabeth Hansen
- Born: 20 April 1950 (age 76); Oslo, Norway
- Occupations: Poet & translator
- Writing career
- Period: 1976–present
- Genres: Poetry; Fiction; Children's books Essays

Inger Elisabeth Hansen (born 20 April 1950) is a Norwegian poet and translator. She has been awarded the Dobloug Prize, the Brage Prize, and the Norwegian Critics Prize for Literature. She was president of the Norwegian Writers' Union from 1997 to 1999.

== Personal life ==
Hansen was born in Oslo on 20 April 1950.

== Literary career ==
Her poetry collection Trask was awarded the Brage Prize in 2003 and nominated for the Nordic Council's Literature Prize in 2004. An extensive selection of her poetry in Spanish will be published by Bartleby in 2010.

In addition to writing her own poetry she has translated Cesar Vallejo, Juan Gelman, Rosario Castellanos and other Spanish and Latin-American poets into Norwegian, as well as Maryam Azimi and Märta Tikkanen. She has also taught Spanish-language literature at the University of Oslo, and served as president of the Norwegian Writers' Union from 1997 to 1999.

She was awarded the Norwegian Critics Prize for Literature in 2015.

== Awards ==
- Gyldendal's Endowment 1986
- Aschehoug Prize 1994
- Dobloug Prize 1994
- Brage Prize 2003

== Works ==
=== Poetry ===
- Det er nå det er like før. Forfatterforlaget Dikt & Datt. 1976.
- Klodedikt. Gyldendal. 1979.
- Hablabaror. Munnenes bok. Gyldendal. 1983.
- Dobbel dame mot løvenes ørken. Gyldendal. 1986.
- I rosen. Aschehoug. 1993.
- Fraværsdokumenter. Aschehoug. 2000.
- Trask. Forflytninger i tidas skitne fylde. Aschehoug. 2003.

=== Fiction ===
- Pinlige historier (short stories). Cappelen. 1991.

=== Essays ===
- Blindsoner - Utvalgte artikler og essays. Aschehoug. 2003.

=== Children's books ===
- Inger Elisabeth Hansen; Torgeir Schjerven (1992). Hugo og treet som forsvant. Cappelen.

Cultural offices
Preceded by Thorvald Steen	Chair of the Norwegian Authors' Union; 1997–1999	Succeeded by Karsten Alnæs
