= Kari Grossmann =

Norwegian artist and children's writer

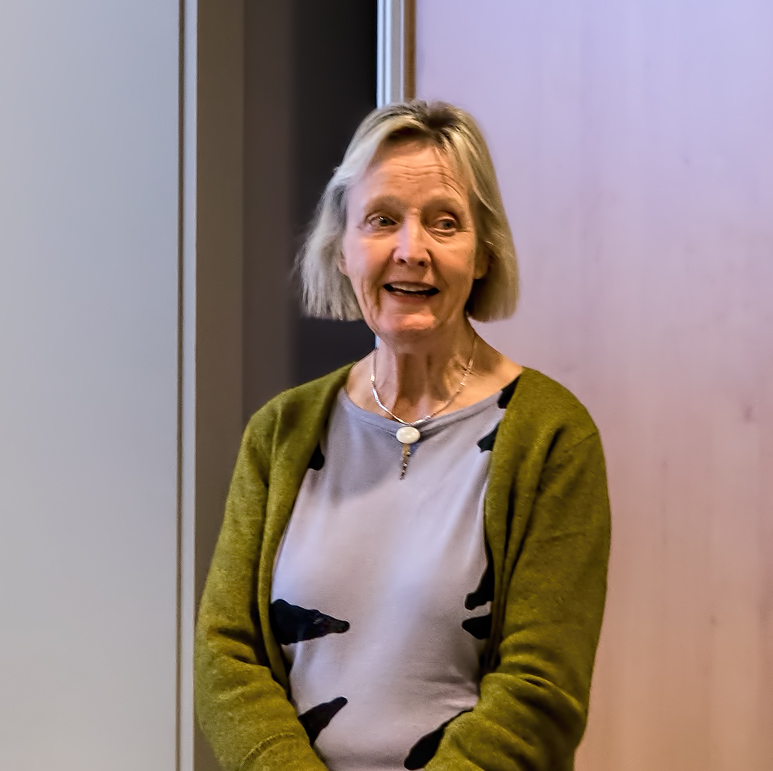
Kari Grossmann in 2016

Kari Grossmann (born 1942) is a Norwegian artist and children's writer. One of Norway's most popular illustrators, she has been called the Queen of Norwegian Everyday Picture Books. Her books in the Lillesøster (Little Sister) series are popular in both Norway and Denmark.
