= Maria Parr =

Norwegian children's writer (born 1981)

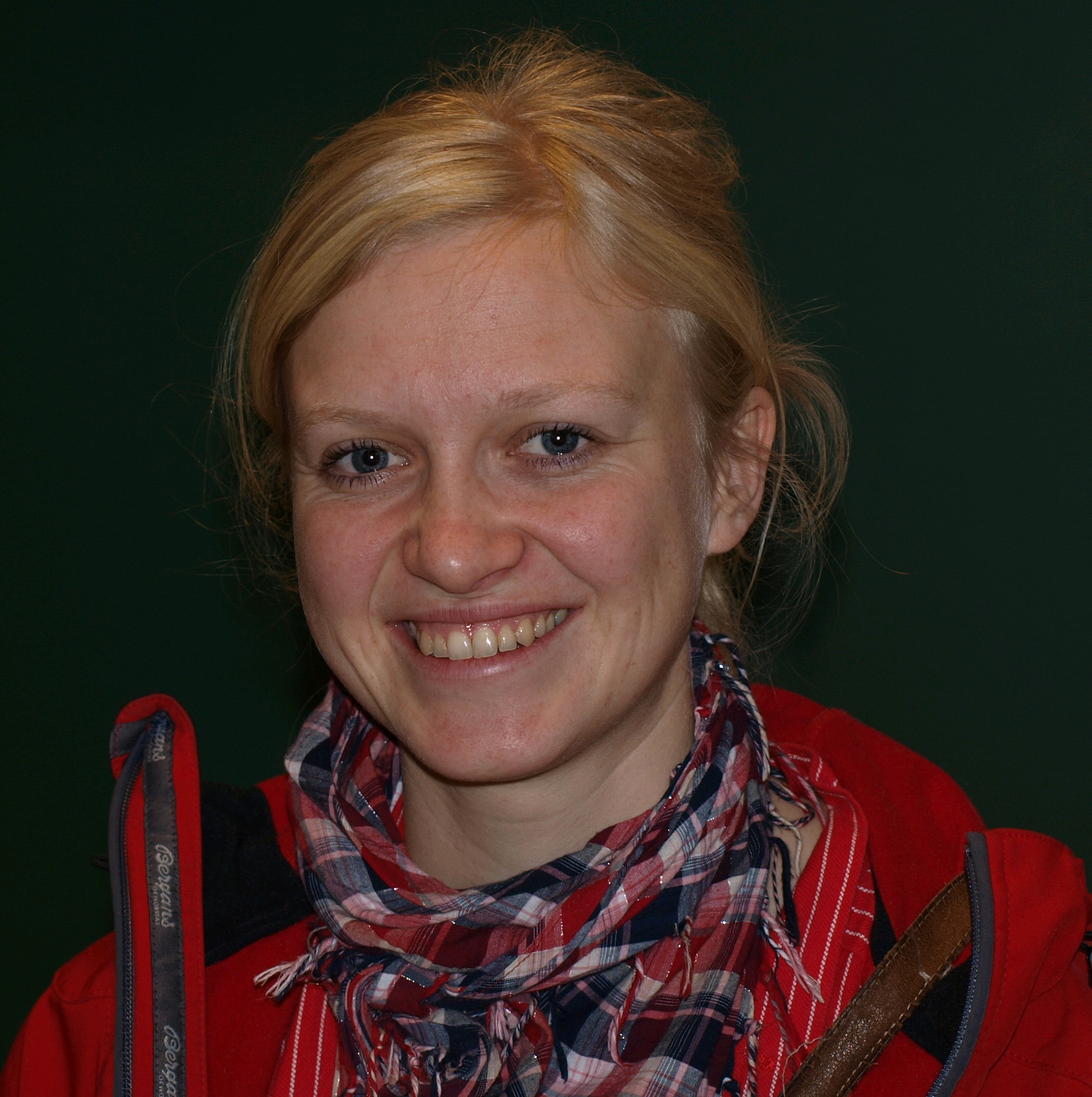
- Maria Parr, 2009.
- Born: 18 January 1981 (age 45); Vanylven Municipality, Norway
- Education: University of Bergen
- Occupation: Children's writer
- Notable work: Waffle Hearts; Astrid the unstoppable Lena, the Sea, and Me
- Awards: Zilveren Griffel (2008); Brage Prize (2009 & 2017); Nynorsk User of the Year (2010)

Maria Parr (born 18 January 1981 in Vanylven Municipality) is a Norwegian children's writer.

She studied Nordic Languages and Literature at the University of Bergen. She currently teaches part-time at the high school in Vanylven.

Her children's books include Vaffelhjarte (2005) (published in English as Waffle Hearts in 2013), Tonje Glimmerdal (2009) (published in English as Astrid the unstoppable in 2018) and Keeperen og havet (2017) (published in English as Lena, the Sea, and Me in 2017), among others. She has won the Brage Prize twice, in 2009 and 2017. She received the Nynorsk User of the Year award in 2010.

== Works ==
- 2005: Vaffelhjarte – translated into English as Waffle Hearts (2013)
- 2009: Tonje Glimmerdal – translated into English as Astrid the unstoppable (2018)
- 2017: Keeperen og havet – translated into English as Lena, the Sea, and Me (2020)
- 2019: Storebror
- 2023: Oskar og eg

== Awards ==
- 2005: Nynorsk Children's Book Award for Waffle Hearts
- 2006: Ole Vig Award for Astrid the unstoppable
- 2009: Brage Prize for Astrid the unstoppable
- 2010: Critics Prize for the year's best children's literature for Astrid the unstoppable
- 2010: Nynorsk User of the Year
- 2013: Sigmund Skard Fellowship
- 2017: Brage Prize for Lena, the Sea, and Me
- 2018: Sultprisen (Sult Award)
- 2018: Norwegian School Librarians Association Literature Award
- 2023: Brage Prize for Oskar and me
