= Herbjørnsrud =

Herbjørnsrud is a Norwegian surname. Notable people with the surname include:

- Dag Herbjørnsrud (born 1971), Norwegian historian and journalist
- Hans Herbjørnsrud (born 1938), Norwegian writer
