= Teji Grover =

Hindi poet and painter (born 1955)

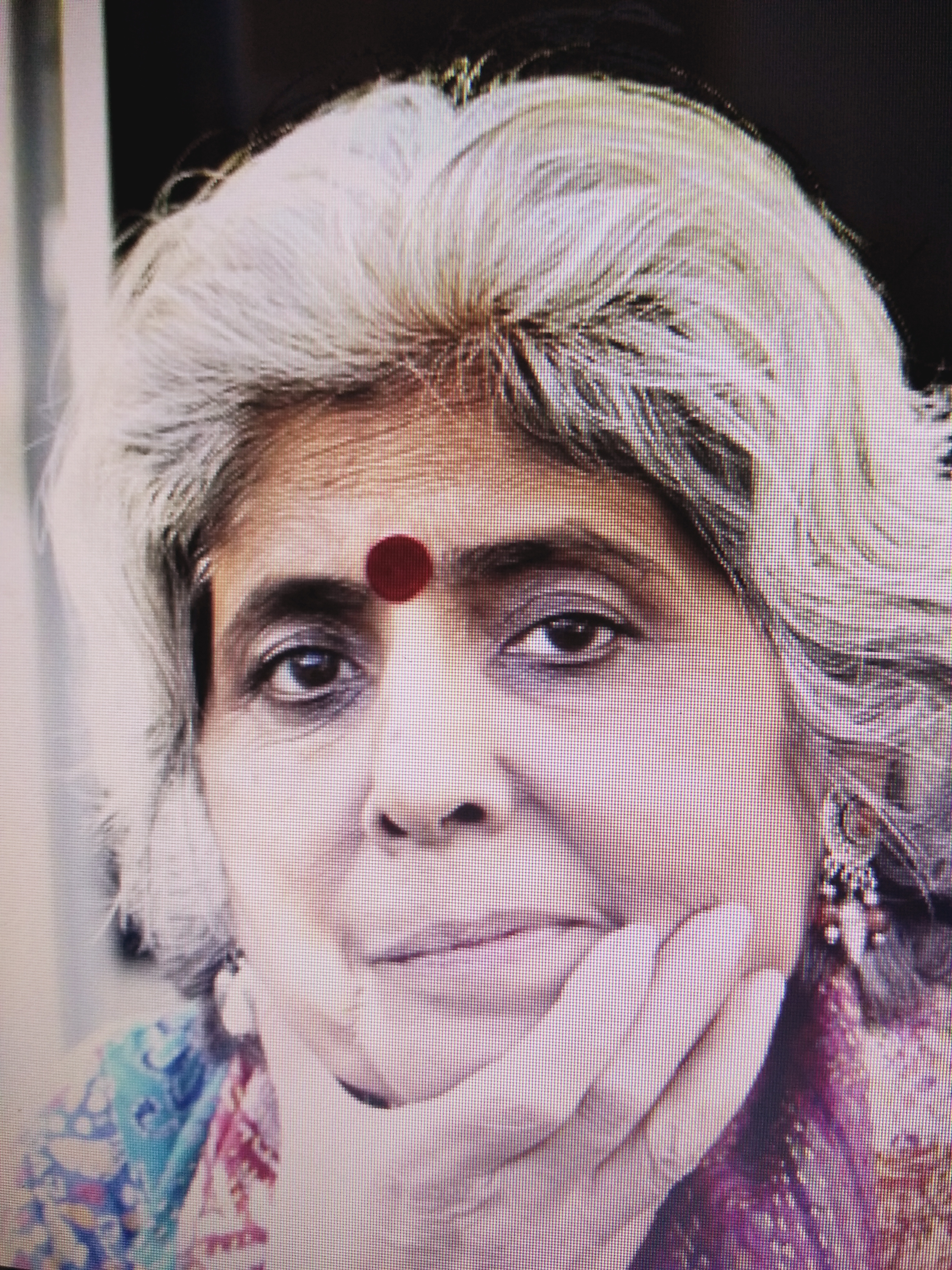
- Grover in 2017
- Born: March 7, 1955 (age 71); Pathankot, Punjab, India
- Occupations: Poet, painter

Teji Grover is a Hindi poet, fiction writer, translator and painter. According to poet and critic Ashok Vajpeyi, "Teji Grover shapes her language away from the prevalent idiom of Hindi poetry. In her poetry language acquires a form which is unique..." Her poems have been translated into many Indian and foreign languages.

Grover's fiction is known for its blending of dream and reality. Polish Hindi scholar Kamila Junik writes about her novel Neela (Blue), "All the characters write. All the events are being written. The existence is being written as well. There is no other world beyond writing."

Through her translations, Teji Grover has introduced modern Scandinavian writers and poets to Hindi readers, such as Knut Hamsun, Tarjei Vesaas, Jon Fosse, Kjell Askildsen, Gunnar Björling, Hans Herbjørnsrud, Lars Amund Vaage, Edith Södergran, Harry Martinson, Tomas Tranströmer, Lars Lundkvist, and Ann Jäderlund, as also the French writer Marguerite Duras.

She is also an abstract painter, using organic and natural colours.

== Life ==
Teji Grover was born on 7 March 1955 at Pathankot in the state of Punjab in India. She taught English literature at MCM DAV College for Women at Chandigarh for over two decades before early retirement in 2003. She is based in Bhopal, Madhya Pradesh.

== Awards and fellowships ==
- Bharat Bhushan Agrawal Award for poetry (1989);
- Writer-in-Residence/Director, Premchand Srijanpeeth, Ujjain (1995–1997);
- Senior Fellow (Literature), Department of Culture, Ministry of Human Resource Development, Government of India, New Delhi (1995–1997); and
- Sayed Haider Raza (S. H. Raza) Award for poetry (2003);
- Fellow, Institute of Advanced Study, Nantes, France (2016–2017).
- Vani Foundation Distinguished Translator Award (2019).
- The Royal Order of the Polar Star, Member 1st Class, by the King and the Queen of Sweden (2019) for promoting literary and cultural relations between India and Sweden.

== Work ==
=== Original work ===
Teji Grover's individual collections of poetry are:

- Yahan Kucch Andheri Aur Tikhi Hai Nadi (Bharati Bhasha Prakashan, Delhi, 1983);
- Lo Kaha Sambari (National Publishing House, New Delhi, 1994; ISBN 81-214-0537-8);
- Ant Ki Kucch Aur Kavitayen (Vani Prakashan, New Delhi, 2000); and
- Maitri (Surya Prakashan Mandir, Bikaner, 2008; ISBN 81-88858-51-X);
- Darpan Abhi Kaanch Hee Thaa (Vani Prakashan, New Delhi, 2019; ISBN 978-93-88684-48-4).

The second edition of the collection Lo Kaha Sambari was published by Vani Prakashan, New Delhi, in 2016 (ISBN 978-93-5229-362-9). The second edition of the collection Maitri was published by Vani Prakashan, New Delhi, in 2020 (ISBN 978-93-89915-25-9).

Her selected poems were published in 2021. The volume is titled Kathputli Kee Aankh: Chuni Hui Kavitaen (Surya Prakashan Mandir, Bikaner, 2021); ISBN 978-93-87252-94-3.

Her poems also figured in the following books:

- Jaise Parampara Sajate Hue (Parag Prakashan, Delhi, 1982), an anthology of poems by three fellow poets; and
- Teji aur Rustam Ki Kavitayen (ISBN 978-81-7223-879-7), a two-in-one, two-sided book of poems published by HarperCollins India in 2009.

The most recent publication of her poems in Hindi was in the online literary magazine Samalochan.

Grover has published two books of fiction:

- a novel Neela (Vani Prakashan, New Delhi, 1999; ISBN 81-7055-668-6); and
- a collection of short stories Sapne Mein Prem Ki Saat Kahanian (Vani Prakashan, New Delhi, 2009; ISBN 9350001136).

The second edition of her novel came out in 2016 (Vani Prakashan, New Delhi; ISBN 978-81-7055-668-8).

Grover has published a collection of essays, memoirs and travelogues, another collection of essays on folktales and a book of autofiction:

- Neela Ghar aur Doosri Yatrayen (Vani Prakashan, New Delhi, 2016; ISBN 978-93-5229-365-0);
- Akam se Puram Tak: Lok Kathaon ka Ghar aur Bahar (Eklavya, Bhopal, 2017; ISBN 978-93-85236-21-1).
- Tooji Sherji Aur Aatmgalp (Sambhavna Prakashan, Hapur, 2025; ISBN 978-93-82673-93-4);

Grover has also published the following book for children:

- Man Mein Khushi Paida Karne Wale Rang (ISBN 978-81-94599-20-3). The book was published by Jugnoo Prakashan, an imprint of Takshila Publication, New Delhi, in 2020.

=== Translations of her work ===
==== Books ====
- In 2009 the Polish translation of Teji Grover's novel Neela by Kamila Junik was published by Ksiegarnia Akademicka, Kraków, under the title Blekit (ISBN 978-83-7638-010-0).
- In 2019 a collection of her selected poems was translated into Swedish and was published by Tranan, a Stockholm-based publisher. The title of the book was HUR SKA JAG SÄGA VAD SOM KOMMER (ISBN 978-91-88253-83-5). The poems were translated by six Swedish poets and translators, namely, Ann Jäderlund, Birgitta Wallin, Lars Andersson, Lars Hermansson, Niclas Nilsson and Staffan Söderblom.
- In 2020 her novel Neela and the collection of her short stories Sapne Mein Prem Ki Saat Kahanian were published together in English translation by Vani Book Company, an imprint of Vani Prakashan Group, under the title Blue and Other Tales of Obsessive Love (ISBN 978-81-948736-4-8). The book was translated by Meena Arora Nayak.

Teji Grover's poems have been translated into Indian and foreign languages including Marathi, English, Swedish, Polish, Norwegian, Catalan and Estonian. English translations of her poems have been included in the following anthologies:

- Penguin New Writing in India, ed. Aditya Behl and David Nicholls (Penguin Books India, New Delhi,1992; ISBN 0-14-023340-7);
- In Their Own Voice, ed. Arlene Zide (Penguin Books India, New Delhi, 1993; ISBN 0140156437 and 9780140156430);
- An Anthology of Modern Hindi Poetry, ed. Kailash Vajpeyi (Rupa & Co., New Delhi, 1998; ISBN 8171674305 and 9788171674305);
- The Tree of Tongues, ed. E. V. Ramakrishnan (Indian Institute of Advanced Study, Shimla, 1999; ISBN 8185952701);
- Love Poems from India, ed. Meena Alexander (Everyman's Library/Knopf, 2005; ISBN 0-14-303264-X);
- Speaking for Myself: An Anthology of Asian Women's Writing, eds. Sukrita Paul Kumar and Malashri Lal (Penguin Books India and India International Center, New Delhi, 2009; ISBN 9780143065333); and
- Home from A Distance, eds. Giriraj Kiradoo and Rahul Soni (Pratilipi Books, Jaipur, 2011; ISBN 9788192066592 ).

Her poems figure in the following anthologies in foreign languages:

- Swedish: Roster fraan Indien, eds. Birgitta Wallin and Tomas Lofstrom (Sveriges Forfattarforbund, Stockholm, 1997; ISBN 91-7448-994-1), and Innan Ganges Flyter In I Natten, eds. Tomas Lofstrom and Birgitta Wallin (Bokforlaget Tranan, Stockholm, 2009; ISBN 978-91-86307-07-3);
- Polish: Cracow Indological Studies, Volume VI, Literatura Indyjska W Przekladzie (Ksiegarnia Akademicka, Kraków, 2004; ISBN 83-7188-778-7);
- Catalan: Com espigues de blat amb vents de l'est, ed. Sameer Rawal (Cafe Central and Emboscall, Tordera in 2011; ISBN 978-84-92563-40-1); and
- Norwegian: Stemmer i Andre Hus, ed. Hanne Bramness (Cappelen Damm, Oslo, 2011; ISBN 978-82-02-36632-2).

Her poems have also appeared in a Marathi anthology of Hindi poetry: Sangini niwadak, Hindi stree kavita, ed. and trans. by Chandrakant Patil (Manovikas Prakashan, 2012; ISBN 9789381636404).

The international literary journals in which the English translations of her poems have appeared include Poetry International Rotterdam, Rhino: The Poetry Forum, Chase Park, Modern Poetry in Translation, Hindi: Language, Discourse, Writing, Indian Literature, Paintbrush, Aufgabe and dialog.

The non-English international journals in which her poems have been published include Lyrikvannen (Swedish), Karavan (Swedish) and Sirp (Estonian).

In 2018 an issue of the Swedish journal Karavan was focused on her writing and her art-work. The issue carried an interview with her, translation of a long poem by her and two articles on her paintings.

Her novel Neela appeared in English translation, by Meena Arora Nayak, in the journal Hindi: Language, Discourse, Writing in 2000.

Two of her short stories, "Bhikshuni" and "Suparna", have also been translated into and published in English.

Her short story "Su" has been translated into Croatian and published in the anthology Lotosi od neona: indijski autori o gradovima i drugim ljubavima edited by Lora Tomas and Marijana Janjic and published by Studio Tim, Rijeka, and Udruga Lotos, Zagreb, in 2017 (ISBN 9789537780661).

=== Translations by Teji Grover ===
Teji Grover has translated into Hindi the following works:

==== From the Norwegian ====
- Pan, a novel by Knut Hamsun, under the title Pāna OCLC 54782311, Vani Prakashan, New Delhi, 2002.
- Sult, a novel by Knut Hamsun, under the title Bhookh (ISBN 81-8143-215-0), Vani Prakashan, New Delhi, 2004.
- Knut Hamsun's memoir Paa Gjengrodde Stier, under the title Ghas Dhanki Pagdandiyan (ISBN 978-93-5072-722-5), Vani Prakashan, New Delhi, 2014.
- Hedda Gabler, a play by Henrik Ibsen (co-translated with Rustam Singh), under the title Hedda Gabler (ISBN 81-8143-622-9), Vani Prakashan, New Delhi, 2006.
- Master Builder, a play by Henrik Ibsen (co-translated with Rustam Singh), under the title Master Builder (ISBN 81-8143-621-0), Vani Prakashan, New Delhi, 2006.
- An anthology of ten contemporary Norwegian short stories, under the title Das Samkaleen Norwigee Kahanian (ISBN 978-81-8143-733-4), Vani Prakashan, New Delhi, 2008.
- Fuglane, a novel by Tarjei Vesaas, under the title Parinde (ISBN 978-93-5072-215-2), Vani Prakashan, New Delhi, 2012.
- Aliss at the Fire, a novel by Jon Fosse, under the title Aag Ke Paas Aliss Hai Yeh (ISBN 978-93-5229-363-6), Vani Prakashan, New Delhi, 2016.
- Mendhak, a story book for children by Hans Sande (ISBN 978-93-91132-33-0), Eklavya, Bhopal, 2021.
- Archimedes Aur Bread Ka Slice, a story book for children by Hans Sande (ISBN 978-93-91132-42-2), Eklavya, Bhopal, 2021.
- Rihai Ka Ek Aakasmik Pal, short stories by Kjell Askildsen (co-translated with Rustam Singh and Abhishek Agarwal) (ISBN 978-81-931217-3-3), Sambhavna Prakashan, Hapur, 2026.

Apart from these books, she translated the following book into English:

- The Plum Tree, a story book for children by Hans Sande (ISBN 978-81-19771-42-4), Eklavya, Bhopal, 2024.

==== From the Swedish ====
- An anthology of 23 Swedish poets, under the title Barf Ki Khushboo (ISBN 81-7055-827-1) (co-edited with Lars Andersson), Vani Prakashan, New Delhi, in 2001.
- A collection of poems by the Swedish poet Lars Lundkvist, under the title Tove Olga Aurora (ISBN 81-8143-301-7), Vani Prakashan, New Delhi, 2006.
- A selection of poems of the Swedish poet Ann Jäderlund, under the title Pheeka Gulabi Rang (ISBN 81-88858-57-9), Surya Prakashan Mandir, Bikaner, 2008.

==== From the French ====
- La maladie de la mort, a novel by Marguerite Duras, under the title Mrityurog (ISBN 978-93-5000-296-4), Vani Prakashan, New Delhi, 2010.

==== From the Latvian ====
- Life-Stories, a collection of short stories by Nora Ikstena, under the title Jeevan-Gathayen (ISBN 978-93-5229-404-6), Vani Prakashan, New Delhi, 2016.

==== From the Estonian ====
- A selection of poems (with Rustam Singh) of the Estonian poet Doris Kareva, under the title Aag Jo Jalati Nahin (ISBN 978-9392757433),

Rajkamal Prakashan, New Delhi, 2021.

=== Essays ===
From among Teji Grover's essays in Hindi, the following two essays have been translated into and published in English: "The Blue House" and "Looking at the Body of a Poem: The Journey of a Hindi Poet".

Further, the following essays were written and published originally in English:

- "A Poet Caged in the Act of Translation";
- "Weak Pink Color: Translating Ann Jäderlund on the Ghats of the Narmada";
- "A Necessary Poem";
- "The Fragrance of Delgadina’s Soul";
- "A Poet Bursting into Color"; and
- "Incessant Search for Languages: Some Thoughts on Hindi Poetry."

From among these essays, "A Necessary Poem", "The Fragrance of Delgadina’s Soul", "Weak Pink Color: Translating Ann Jäderlund on the Ghats of the Narmada" and "A Poet Caged in the Act of Translation" have been translated into and published in Swedish.

Another of her essays, "Song of the Cows: Translating Lars Amund Vaage's 'Cows' into Hindi", has been translated into and published in Norwegian as part of an anthology of essays on the Norwegian author Lars Amund Vaage's work.

=== Books Edited by Teji Grover ===
Teji Grover has edited five books for children in Hindi, all of them published by Eklavya, Bhopal. These are:

- Doodh Jalebi Jaggagga (ISBN 978-81-87171-84-3);
- Kyon Ji Beta Ram Sahay (ISBN 978-81-87171-86-7);
- Apke Japani Haiku (ISBN 978-81-87171-79-9);
- Mann Ke Laddoo (ISBN 978-81-89976-60-6);
- Hau Hau Happ: A collection of Poems for children (ISBN 978-93-85236-81-5).

In addition, she has compiled and edited a collection of ghazals by well known Hindi shayar Harjeet Singh:

- Mujhse Phir Mil (ISBN 978-93-92621-28-4), published by Sambhavna Prakashan, Hapur, in 2023.

=== Poetry readings and cultural visits ===
In 1999, Teji Grover read her poems at Bengt Berg's Book Cafe Heidruns in Torsby, Sweden. In 2008 she read her poems at the Baltic Center for Writers and Translators, Visby, Sweden, at their annual International Poetry Festival. In the same year, she read her poems in the Olav Hauge Centenary Festival at the poet's birthplace, Ulvik, in Norway. In 2011 she had readings of her poetry at Trondheim, Norway, during the IndiaFestival that was being held there. Further, in 2014 she read her poems at the Writers' House at Tallinn, Estonia.

In 1997, Teji Grover visited Sweden as part of a delegation of 10 Indian writers. Subsequently, she was one of the Indian collaborators of the Indo-Swedish Translation Project, 1998–2009. Under the aegis of this project she translated three volumes of poetry from the Swedish into Hindi (see "Translations by Teji Grover" above.) In 2008, she lectured at the Book Fair at Gothenburg on her translation of the Swedish poet Ann Jäderlund's poetry into Hindi.

=== Exhibitions of her paintings ===
Grover has held the following solo shows of her paintings:

- Earth Colors: At Jawahar Kala Kendra, Jaipur, in November 2010;
- Jo Nahin Hai: At Arpana Fine Arts Gallery, New Delhi, in January 2011;
- Maitri: At Bharat Bhavan, Bhopal, in November 2013. and
- The Earth is Blue like an Orange: At the Institute of Advanced Studies, Nantes, France, in March–June, 2017.

Her paintings were also part of the following group shows:

- Palettes of Bhopal: At Jawahar Kala Kendra, Jaipur, in 2011;
- Ensemble: At Kala Academy, Goa, in February 2012.

== See also ==
- List of Indian writers
- Rustam Singh
