= Trude Marstein =

Norwegian author (born 1973)

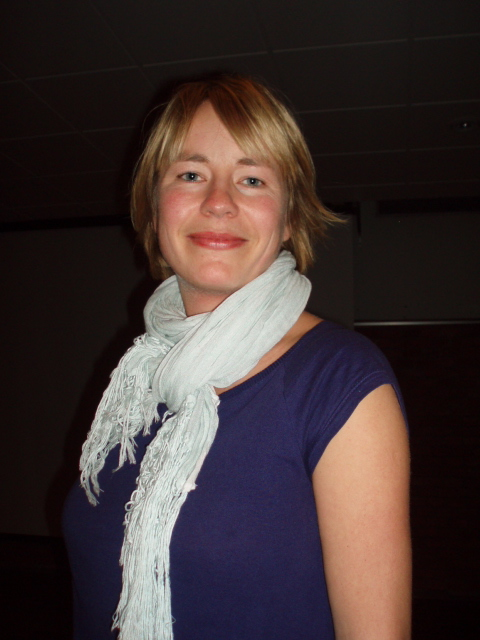
- Born: 18 April 1973 (age 53); Tønsberg, Norway
- Occupation: Author
- Children: Jo Almaas Marstein
- Writing career
- Period: 1998–present
- Genres: Prose collection; Drama; Novels
- Notable awards: Dobloug Prize; Norwegian Critics Prize for Literature; Amalie Skram Prize

Trude Marstein (born 18 April 1973) is a Norwegian author. She attended Telemark University College and studied Creative Writing Studies. At the University of Oslo, she studied pedagogy, psychology, and the history of literature. She debuted in 1998 with a collection of prose, titled Sterk sult, plutselig kvalme, for which she received Tarjei Vesaas' debutantpris. She was awarded the Amalie Skram Prize in 2023.

== Bibliography ==
- Sterk sult, plutselig kvalme, (English title: Strong Hunger, Sudden Nausea) collected prose (1998)
- Plutselig høre noen åpne en dør, (English title: Suddenly Hearing Someone Open a Door) novel (2000)
- Happy Birthday, children's book (2002)
- Elin og Hans, (English title: Elin and Hans) novel (2002)
- Konstruksjon og inderlighet, essay collection (2004)
- Byens ansikt – drama (2005) together with Aasne Linnestå, Rune Christiansen, Gunnar Wærness & John Erik Riley
- Gjøre godt, novel (2006)
- Ingenting a angre pa, novel (2010)
- Hjem til meg, novel (2012)
- Sa mye hadde jeg, novel (2018)

== Awards ==
- Tarjei Vesaas' debutantpris 1998, for Sterk sult, plutselig kvalme
- Sult-prisen 2002
- Vestfolds Litteraturpris 2002
- Dobloug Prize 2004
- Norwegian Critics Prize for Literature 2006, for Gjøre godt
- PO Enquists pris 2007
