= Rustam Singh (poet) =

Indian poet, philosopher, translator and editor

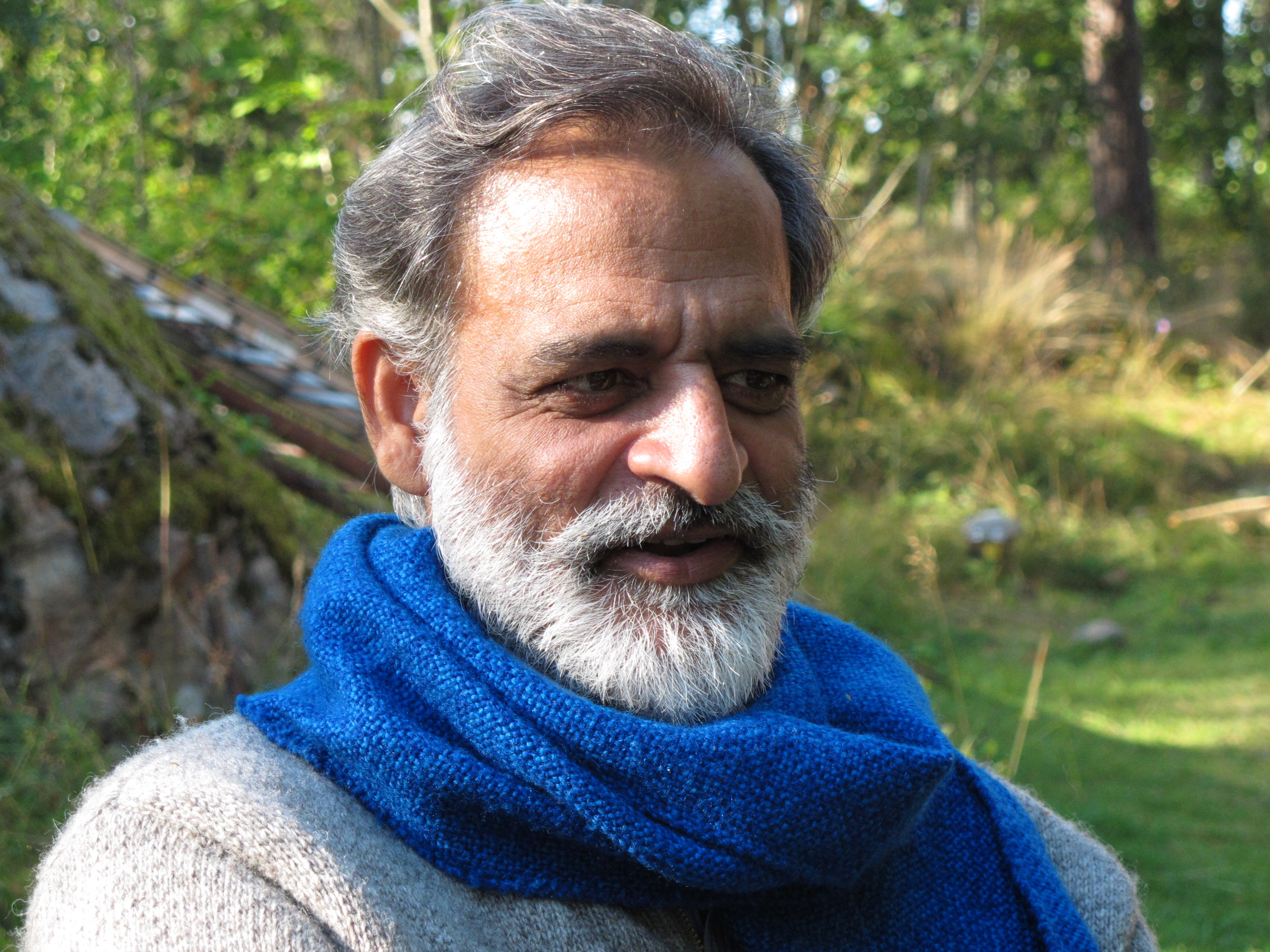
Rustam Singh, poet and philosopher

Rustam Singh (born 16 May 1955) is an Indian poet, philosopher, translator and editor. He writes poetry in Hindi (under the name Rustam) and theoretical and philosophical papers and essays in English. He is regarded as an important Hindi poet of this period. His poems have been translated into many Indian and foreign languages including English, Telugu, Marathi, Malayalam, Panjabi, Swedish, Norwegian and Estonian. Doris Kareva, well known Estonian and European poet, has written about his poetry: "Rustam is a poet with a rare wavelength. His calm, clear and concise sentences create an atmosphere of slightly eerie intensity. His visions tempt one to look over the edge, into the depth of nothingness, sensing distant echoes of Beckett or Chirico." Apart from his books, his poems have appeared in many important literary journals, magazines and blogs, such as Sakshatkaar, Poorvagrah, Bahuvachan, Jansatta, Pratilipi, Indian Literature, International Quarterly, Aufgabe, LyrikVannen, etc. Some of the recent publication of his poems in Hindi was in the online literary magazines Samalochan, Janakipul and Sadaneera.

In his philosophical essays, Rustam Singh dwells on subjects such as love, loss, separation, death, time, being, existence, violence, the self and the other, and on the controversial relation between humans and nonhuman animals and other entities in nature. In the process he throws up a number of new concepts such as dialogicality (which he has redefined), non-dialogicality, the dialogical self, the non-dialogical self, the weight of the self, the selfless-one, the other-than-self, humans-as-monsters and so on. While doing this he displays a variety of writing styles, rare in modern Indian philosophical writing.

== Life and career ==
Rustam Singh was born in Jadla, a village in Nawanshehr district in the state of Punjab, India, where his father had been allotted land after he migrated from Gobindpura in district Gujrat of present-day Pakistan during partition of India in 1947. Later, the family settled in Tohana town in Haryana, where he got his early school and college education. In his teens, he was a mechanic, a lathe operator and a welder for a short period. Later, in his twenties, he was an army officer for five years. He was a Captain when he resigned from the army and got back to the academics.

He holds an M.Phil. (Gold Medal) and a Ph.D. degree in political science and political philosophy, respectively, from Panjab University, Chandigarh. He was awarded the University Grants Commission (UGC) Junior Research Fellowship (October 1986 – September 1988) and then a Senior Research Fellowship (October 1988 – September 1991) to carry out work for his M.Phil. and Ph.D. degrees. The title of his Ph.D. thesis was "Status of Violence in the Marxist Theory of Revolution: From Marx to Mao".

Over the years, Rustam Singh has held the following research and editorial positions, among others:

- Assistant editor of Economic and Political Weekly, Bombay (1993–94);
- Research associate at Centre for the Study of Developing Societies, Delhi (1995–96);
- Fellow at Indian Institute of Advanced Study, Shimla (1996-1999);
- Editor of Summerhill IIAS Review, a journal of Indian Institute of Advanced Study, Shimla (1998-1999);
- Member of the editorial board of Studies in Humanities and Social Sciences, a journal of Indian Institute of Advanced Study, Shimla (1998–1999)
- Founder editor of Hindi: Language, Discourse, Writing (along with Ashok Vajpeyi who was its general editor), a journal of Mahatma Gandhi Antarrashtriya Hindi Vishwavidyalaya (Mahatma Gandhi International Hindi University), then located partly at New Delhi and partly at Wardha (1999-2003);
- Visiting scholar at Centre for Philosophy, Jawaharlal Nehru University, New Delhi (2007).
- Fellow and senior editor at Eklavya Foundation, an NGO working in the field of school education in Madhya Pradesh, India (2005-2007); and
- Senior fellow and senior editor at Eklavya Foundation, Madhya Pradesh, India (2007-2015).

== Work ==
=== Original work ===
==== Books ====
Rustam Singh has published the following collections of poetry:

- Agyanata Se Agyanata Tak (self-published), 1981.
- Rustam Ki Kavitaen, Vani Prakashan, New Delhi, 2003 (ISBN 81-8143-046-8).
- Meri Atma Kanpti Hai, Surya Prakashan Mandir, Bikaner, 2015 (ISBN 978-93-82307-42-6).
- Ped Neela Tha aur Anya Kavitayen, Eklavya, Bhopal, 2016 (ISBN 978-93-85236-15-0). This collection has poems for teenagers.
- Na To Main Kuchh Keh Raha Tha, Surya Prakashan Mandir, Bikaner, 2020 (ISBN 978-93-87252-64-6).
- Jo Hai Aur Jaisa Hai, Surya Prakashan Mandir, Bikaner, 2021 (ISBN 978-93-87252-97-4).
- Sooni Sadkon Par Jab Main Vahan Ghoom Raha Tha, Surya Prakashan Mandir, Bikaner, 2021 (ISBN 978-93-87252-92-9).
- Main Prithvi Se Bichhud Gaya Tha, Sambhavna Prakashan, Hapur, 2024 (ISBN 978-93-81623-22-0).
- Ek Khushboo Vahan Phaili Thee, Surya Prakashan Mandir, Bikaner, 2026 (ISBN 978-81-19874-99-6).

His selected poems were published in 2021. This volume is titled Aur Kash Ki Main Aik Neeli Shila Hota: Chuni Hui Kavitaen, Surya Prakashan Mandir, Bikaner, 2021 (ISBN 978-93-87252-93-6).

His poems also figure in Teji Aur Rustam Ki Kavitaen, HarperCollins India, Noida, 2009 (ISBN 978-81-7223-879-7). This is a two-sided, two-in-one book with independent collections of selected poems by two poets. The other poet in this book is Teji Grover. Some of his poems figure in a collection of poems of fourteen Hindi poets, Bahar Sab Shaant Hai (Aadhar Prakashan, Panchkula, 1991), edited by Desh Nirmohi.

Singh is the author of the following books in English:

- 'Weeping' and Other Essays on Being and Writing, Pratilipi Books, Jaipur, 2011 (ISBN 978-81-920665-0-9);
- A Story of Political Ideas for Young Readers, Volume 1: Socrates, Plato, Aristotle, Machiavelli, Eklavya, Bhopal, 2010 (ISBN 978-81-89976-89-7); and
- Violence and Marxism: Marx to Mao, Aakar Books, New Delhi, 2015 (ISBN 978-93-5002-377-8 (pb) and ISBN 978-93-5002-371-6 (hb));
- Literature, Philosophy, Political Theory: Selected Essays, Aakar Books, New Delhi, 2022 (ISBN 978-9350027592). This book is for sale and distribution in South Asia only. There is also a Routledge edition of this book for sale in the rest of the world, that is, outside South Asia.
- Literature, Philosophy, Political Theory: Selected Essays, Routledge, London and New York, 2026 (ISBN 9781041297628).

==== Papers and essays ====
Rustam Singh's theoretical and philosophical papers and essays include the following:

- "Status of Violence in Marx’s Theory of Revolution", Economic and Political Weekly, Vol. XXIV, No. 4 (January 28, 1989);
- "Restoring Revolutionary Theory: Towards an Understanding of Lenin’s The State and Revolution", Economic and Political Weekly, Vol. XXIV, No. 43 (October 28, 1989);
- "Violence in the Leninist Revolution", Economic and Political Weekly, Vol. XXV, No. 52 (December 29, 1990);
- "Cohen’s Second Coming: Pitfalls of Analytical Interpretation of Marx", Punjab Journal of Politics, Vol. XVII, No. 1 (June 1993);
- "Man, Political Man, Political Theory", Economic and Political Weekly, Vol. XXIX, No. 31 (July 30, 1994);
- "Reflections on a form", Seminar, 440 (April 1996);
- "Ontology of wage labour", Seminar, 452 (April 1997);
- "Feeling Politics: Reinstating the Subjective Self", Economic and Political Weekly, Vol. XXXII, No. 33-34 (August 16–23, 1997);
- "Dialogicality and Being: A Fragment", Studies in Humanities and Social Sciences, Vol. V, No. 1 (Summer 1998), IIAS, Shimla;
- " 'Weeping': For Udayan Vajpeyi", Indian Literature, No. 186 (July–August 1998);
- "Gift, Passivity, Neuter", in Franson Manjali (ed.), Poststructuralism and Cultural Theory: The Linguistic Turn and Beyond, Allied Publishers, New Delhi, 2006 (ISBN 978-8184240207);
- "Useless Thought: Notes on Friedrich Nietzsche", in Franson Manjali (ed.), Nietzsche: Philologist, Philosopher and Cultural Critic, Allied Publishers, New Delhi, 2006 (ISBN 978-8184240214);
- "Self and Time", Pratilipi, April 2008;
- "Death and the Self", Pratilipi, June 2008;
- "To be Regardful of the Earth", Pratilipi, August 2008;
- "To be Fortunate", Pratilipi, June 2010;
- "Beginning an Essay", Pratilipi, November 2010;
- "Simulating: The Heart Breaking", Comparative and Continental Philosophy, Vol. 4, No. 2 (2012);
- "Roots of Violence: Jīva, Life and Other Things", in Saitya Brata Das and Soumyabrata Choudhury (eds.), The Weight of Violence: Religion, Language, Politics, Oxford University Press, New Delhi, 2015 (ISBN 978-0-19-945372-6).
- "Not This, Not That: Maurice Blanchot and Poststructuralism", Comparative and Continental Philosophy, Vol. 8, No. 1 (2016);
- "Not This, Not That: Maurice Blanchot and Poststructuralism", in Franson Manjali and Marc Crepon (eds.), Philosophy, Language and the Political: Poststructuralism in Perspective, Aakar Books, New Delhi, 2018 (ISBN 978-93-5002-484-3); and
- "Visual Objects: Types, Forms and Status", New Horizons: A Multidisciplinary Research Journal, Vol. XV (August 2018).

.

=== Translations of Singh's work ===
Rustam Singh's selected poems in English translation were published in 2026. This volume is titled The Rock Was Turning into Fire: Selected Poems, Red River, New Delhi, 2026 (ISBN 978-81-69092-47-0). A volume of his selected poems in Estonian translation, translated by the Estonian poet Doris Kareva, was also published in 2026. This volume is titledTuhatvarvi Kivi, Allikaarne Publishers, Lelle, 2026 (ISBN 978-9916-9271-6-8).

The other English translations of his poems have appeared in International Quarterly (USA), Indian Literature, and Aufgabe (USA). Apart from English and other Indian languages, Singh's poems have been translated into Swedish, Norwegian and Estonian.The Swedish translations of his poems, by the Swedish poet and novelist Agneta Pleijel, were published in the Swedish poetry magazine LyrikVannen. The translations of his poems in Estonian, by the Estonian poet Doris Kareva, have appeared in the Estonian magazine Sirp. Ingrid Storholmen, the Norwegian poet and novelist, gave several readings of her translations of Singh's poems during the India Festival at Trondheim, Norway, in 2011.

Further, his book A Story of Political Ideas for Young Readers, Volume 1: Socrates, Plato, Aristotle, Machiavelli has been translated into and published in Hindi.

Some of his philosophical essays, for example "Remembering a Century: Mourning a Lack and a Loss of Power", "Ruptured (in) Writing", and "Roots of Violence: Jīva, Life and Other Things", too, have been translated into and published in Hindi.

=== Translations by Rustam Singh ===
Rustam Singh has translated the following books into Hindi:

- (With Teji Grover) Hedda Gabler by Henrik Ibsen, under the title Hedda Gabler, Vani Prakashan, New Delhi, 2006 (ISBN 81-8143-622-9);
- (With Teji Grover) Master Builder by Henrik Ibsen, under the title Master Builder, Vani Prakashan, New Delhi, 2006 (ISBN 81-8143-621-0);
- A selection of poems by the Norwegian poet Olav Hauge, under the title Saat Havayen, Vani Prakashan, New Delhi, 2008 (ISBN 978-81-8143-956-7); and
- A selection of poems by the Norwegian poet and novelist Lars Amund Vaage, under the title Shabd Ke Peechhe Chhaya Hai, Vani Prakashan, New Delhi, 2014 (ISBN 978-93-5072-723-2).
- A selection of poems (with Teji Grover) of the Estonian poet Doris Kareva, under the title Aag Jo Jalati Nahin (ISBN 978-9392757433), Rajkamal Prakashan, New Delhi, 2021.
- A selection of poems of seven Panjabi poets, under the title Saat Panjabi Kavi, Surya

prakashan Mandir, Bikaner, 2023 (ISBN 978-93-92252-34-1).

- A selection of poems of the French poet Annie Deveaux Berthelot, under the title Main Tumhen Patjhad Mein Milne Aoungi (ISBN 978-81-983324-6-2), Des Plumes Press, Faridabad, 2025.
- Raza's Bindu by Ritu Khoda and Vanita Pai, under the title Bindu, published by Eklavya, Bhopal, in 2014 (ISBN 978-93-81300-75-6). It's a book for children on the well-known Indian painter Syed Haider Raza. The book was originally published in English by Scholastic, India.
- Jab Main Ghar Pahuncha To Ghoda Ja Chuka Tha, a story book for children by Hans Sande, published by Eklavya, Bhopal, in 2021 (ISBN 978-93-91132-25-5)
- Aa Jao Ab Raat, a story book for children by Hans Sande, published by Eklavya, Bhopal, in 2021 (ISBN 978-93-91132-26-2).

=== Books Edited by Rustam Singh ===
In 2025 Rustam Singh put together and edited a collection of poems by eighteen Hindi poets. This volume is titled Kuchh Alag Swar: Atharah Samkaleen Hindi Kavi, Surya Prakashan Mandir, Bikaner, 2025 (ISBN 978-81-19874-08-8).

=== Readings ===
Apart from giving readings of his poems in India, Rustam Singh has read his poems in other countries as well. For example, in 2008 he read his poems in the international poetry festival organised by the Baltic Centre for Writers and Translators, Visby, Sweden. The Swedish translations of his poems were read out by Birgitta Wallin, editor of the Swedish cultural magazine Karavan. In the same year, he read his poems at the poetry festival celebrating the birth centenary of the Norwegian poet Olav Hauge at the village of Ulvik in north-western Norway where Hauge had lived all his life. In 2011, he read his poems during the India Festival at Trondheim, Norway. Similarly, in 2014 he read his poems at the Writers House in Tallinn, Estonia, where the Estonian translations of his poems were read out by the Estonian poet Doris Kareva.

== Ideas and arguments ==
=== Dialogicality ===
A key idea of Rustam Singh is his idea of the "dialogicality" of the socio-historical world, laid out primarily in his essay "Dialogicality and Being: A Fragment", but also in "Man, Political Man, Political Theory", published earlier.

According to Singh, the socio-historical being of the world is a "dialogical" being, but the dialogical is merely conflictual. Thus Singh goes against the meaning commonly given to the term dialogical. Because of the perpetually conflict-ridden nature of the dialogical world, this world becomes undesirable for the individual subject. The subject therefore tries to get rid of it by creating or inventing in different ways spheres of existence which are free of the dialogicality of the received world and are as such "non-dialogical".

The phenomenon of imagination plays a crucial role in this process. The dialogicality of the world compels the subject to make an ever-greater and frequent use of imagination to create and take shelter in the non-dialogical.

However, the self that creates or invents the non-dialogical is not one of the socio-historical selves of the subject; rather, it is a separate, non-dialogical self. And while this self comes into existence as a consequence of the received dialogicality of the world, it becomes conscious of its own non-dialogicality and wants to keep it intact.

Singh views love as a typically non-dialogical phenomenon, and loving and the desire to be loved as instances of the attempt by the non-dialogical self to nourish and preserve itself. The process of literary writing and creating works of art illustrates similar behaviour. Singh terms all such forms of behaviour as "non-worldly", by which he means that while these forms are a part of the world in general, they are not located in the socio-historical, that is, the dialogical world.

In tune with the argument above, Singh makes a distinction between "subjecthood" and "subjectivity". As per this distinction, subjecthood inheres in the non-dialogical self of the subject, whereas subjectivity represents his/her this worldly/dialogical/socio-historical/instrumental selves. As a consequence, subjecthood is in perpetual conflict with subjectivity; it struggles to get rid of the latter—the latter being a creature of the (undesirable) dialogical world.

=== Self and 'other' ===
In his essay "To be Fortunate" Singh questions the concept of the other which, along with the concept of the self, is a commonly accepted concept in the Western philosophy and is treated almost as a given. As he puts it, "...there is no other but only a self out there—out of, away from us."

Combining the concept of the self with that of the other, he makes a distinction between, what he calls, "the other self" and "the other-than-self". The former is a self which is different and apart from us. It is "like our own self, but not the same." But it is "a self nevertheless." And it is the selfhood of this self which is the essential thing about it and not the otherness of it. The latter—that is, the other-than-self—comes into existence when we treat the other self as if it lacks a self, or when the other self behaves towards us in a similar manner. To quote Singh, "It is precisely when we conceive the other self...as lacking a self that we lose our own self" and become an other-than-self.

In this essay, Singh introduces another concept related to the self, namely, "the self-less one", which at first look appears to be similar to but is actually very different from the other-than-self. The self-less one is an entity—necessarily with a body and a mind—which has been emptied of the self and does not share any trait with it. Nevertheless, it emerges from the self and is a transformed form of it. It is the result of the desire of a self to lose itself, to transform itself in such a way that it is rid of its worldly character.

To quote Rustam Singh, the self "is an entity of the world, a worldly entity, deeply entrenched in it." Thus it is "caught in a web of relations, in which it can move about but from which it cannot get out." The self-less one, on the other hand, "while it still remains in the world, remains uncoloured by it." "It conducts its daily business, like the self, comes in contact with other entities, indulges in exchange with them when it has to, but does not relate with them, does not strike a relation."

The fuller significance of this concept is shown by the following quote from the essay:

The self-less one has a face and a figure and a shape. It can be recognized and identified. It has an identity but no self.

Does it have a soul? No, it does not, because to have a soul means to have compassion. Yet it is regardful of what is not itself.

It needs to eat and drink and sleep. To walk or sit quietly if it has to.

But it does not accumulate, it does not consume in excess. It is regardful of the earth, too.

=== Existence and self ===
In the essay "To Be Regardful of the Earth" Singh further explores the nature of the self-less one and, in the process, also of the self.

According to him, given its nature the self-less one puts little burden upon the earth and is, as such, closest to the being of the earth. But this is not true about the self. Unlike the self-less one, the self is a burdensome entity. "[T]his burden (this weight) is a constituent of its existence." And it puts this weight not only upon the earth but on other selves as well.

How does the self acquire this weight? To quote Singh: "To have weight, for a thing, means to prop itself on another thing outside of itself. This propping takes place because there is a relation. The relation is there because there is a need for it. This need is created because the thing focuses itself on itself. And this is what this thing called the self does all the time."

For Singh, this is a paradoxical situation. It seems natural to think that if the self remains focused on itself, it would be sufficient in itself. However, on the contrary, due to this self-focusing the self loses its stature and its capacity to endure on its own. Therefore, it tries to "catch hold of all the things around it." But, as Singh puts it, "[T]he self's belief that it will now endure is already an illusion, for in the process of self-focusing, and all that happens as a consequence, the self loses its existence. From now on, it lives as a fiction, as a chimera, as a thing that has blown itself up, but a thing which is visible only to itself. For, so far as existence is concerned, it has already ceased to exist."

According to Singh, "To exist means to have no weight. [Therefore] existence is absolutely weightless." And it is weightless because "it does not focus itself on itself." By doing that it rids itself of the need for relation. Since this need is not there, it does not lean on anything outside of itself.

By focusing itself on itself, on the other hand—and this is a "narcissistic operation"—the self deprives itself of existence.

This leads to a rather novel definition of the self. In Singh's own words: "It becomes possible now to say what the self is. The self is a thing which is constantly away, apart from existence. It is that substance which existence does not carry. It is that extra which is...not taken any account of, is not even noticed by it. As such, the self is utterly insignificant."

However, this is not how the self looks at itself. In fact, it regards itself as the centre of existence. Given its nature as the self, it can only look at itself as something that it believes itself to be. According to Singh, this shows that the vision of the self is tainted by deception. This being so, when the self looks around itself, it "finds only itself there." Therefore, "the more the objects it looks at, the bigger it grows. Its weight is endless."

=== Self and time ===
Singh continues his investigation of the self in two more essays.

In "Self and Time" Singh makes two rather bold assertions: the first, that time does not exist; and the second, that it is the self that creates time. This means that time has no physical reality outside the mind of the self; the only reality it has is inside that mind, in imagination. Further, having thus created time, the self believes that there is actually a thing such as time, and that "it is there, outside its mind."

But why does the self create or imagine time? Why does it believe that it really exists outside its mind? To quote Singh:

The self believes in the existence of time so that it can measure itself against something which is weightier than itself, or, if it is a thing that cannot have weight, is mightier, stronger, lasts longer, lasts endlessly, as time is supposed to do. But why does the self wish to measure itself against time? It wishes to do that in order to feel its own weight and to feel that its weight is no less, is not lesser, than that of time. And if time has no weight, if it is an entity which is weightless, then the self wishes to feel that it is not without the endlessness of time, that this endlessness is within its reach, is in fact in its grasp, or is almost so.

However, this is not the only thing that the self wishes to do. According to Singh, having created time, the self wishes to dominate it—it wishes to "dominate it and rule over it, to be its master." This latter wish of the self comes from its self-image, that is, from the way it perceives itself. "But how does the self perceive itself? What is its vision of itself? What is its dream?":

Its dream is to dominate—to rule over—not only the things that it can see but also the things that it can think about, the things that it can imagine and not yet imagine, the things that it can conceive, invent, conjure up, the things that it can concoct—images, ideas, concepts and words, representations, notions, but not only these. The dream of the self is to master the things that it can create. And time is a thing that it has created.

One can see that the self tends to develop a relation with things which is antagonistic. However, so far as time is concerned this antagonism has in it an element of envy as well. As Singh puts it: "[T]he self believes that time has a life: a life longer than its own life, a life that goes on beyond its own life and was already there when it was born. And the self cannot bear it." Or, in other words: "The self cannot bear...the life of time, a life which makes an appearance in its own life and disappears beyond it, a life before whose disappearance its own life disappears. This disappearance of its own life before the disappearance of the life of time the self cannot bear." With the result that the self gets weighted down by its own creation. "Till now the self was the only thing that had weight. And its weight was enormous. But now time displaces it. It becomes weightier than the self. This too the self cannot bear. It cannot bear this weight, too. This weight crushes it—the only thing which is crushed by this weight of time."

Singh goes on to say that time has weight only for the self. This is so because, firstly, time does not exist for any other entity, but secondly and more importantly, the self itself has weight. It is its own weight which imbues the self with that substance which can be crushed by time "in a way that this crushing, this being crushed, is felt by the self." The self can get rid of this feeling by "let[ting] time die..." But in order to do that the self must lose its own weight, that is, "kill its own story" which "runs parallel to the length of time." And killing its own story means "leaving its existence as the self." According to Singh, given its reckless and impudent character the self will never agree to losing its weight. Rather, "...in the very pursuit of [this] weight it may push itself beyond its endurance and die before its time, thus putting an end to its story."

=== Death and the self ===
In the essay "Death and the Self" Singh brings out a contradictory streak in the nature of the self. On the one hand, the self is an entity which wishes to die and therefore rushes towards its death, trying to bring it closer. Yet, on the other hand, it does not wish to die; in fact, it wishes to live for ever. But since it finds that death is inevitable, "it would like to die its own way and at a moment of its own choosing" because it "does not wish to give up control over its destiny." As a result of these conflicting wishes, the self turns itself into a "desperate entity".

However, so far as existence is concerned, this situation of the self leaves it unimpressed. In fact, neither the death nor even the life of the self makes any difference to existence. Trying to explain the reason for this behaviour of existence, Singh reemphasizes a point he had made earlier in the essay "To be Regardful of the Earth". He had suggested there that due to its nature the self is an entity which is located away and apart from existence, leaving the latter indifferent to it. In the present essay, Singh calls this distance between existence and the self a "hiatus" and a "gulf" created by the latter. And this gulf is so vast that the death of the self makes no "impact" on existence. Further, the absence of this impact shows that "the self was already redundant for existence when it was still alive."

Now, the death towards which the self rushes is not the inevitable death, but rather the death "which it brings about." And it is the inevitability of the first death, "an inevitability that it deeply resents...that makes it speed up the advent of the other." It is this second death, what Singh calls a "fabricated death", which kills the self, and it kills it before the inevitable death could even appear.

This is how the self is deprived of a proper death. However, there is a deeper reason, too, why this deprivation takes place. Since the self does not exist for existence, it does not exist for that death either which Singh calls the inevitable death and what he also calls the "death proper". To quote Singh: "This is how the self is abandoned by death—as it was abandoned by existence—but dies. It dies at the hands of that false death which is death too but is a kind of death which is not preceded by life and therefore does not succeed it: it succeeds only an illusion and comes as one. Having lived without life, the self dies without it, but dies nevertheless."

However, Singh believes that this is still, in its way, a proper death for the self, for even though it is not, really speaking, a proper death, it is proper to the self. This is so because "the self was an entity without life...and it is precisely because of this lack that it needed to die...in the way it does."

At the end of the essay, Singh talks about that "ravaged landscape" that the self manages to create before it is killed by its fabricated death. This landscape is littered with the things that the self makes for itself, but these things are "as dead as the self itself is." Being devoid of life, the self cannot put any life into them. "They are entirely dead and are dead too for what is not themselves." As such, they are no solace to the self. With the result that the self lives in a desolation of its own creation. Singh expresses in the following words his final denouement of the self:

These things, which surround the self, symbolise what it has ravaged in the course of creating this desolation. They are the ravaged face of a world that could have been the world of a 'self' but has turned itself away, leaving towards the self that face of itself which is not a face but a ravaged landscape. This landscape is not visited by the inevitable death. What death will visit a place which has been voided of life? Not the death which is the antithesis of life, but only a death which will kill what is already dead.

=== Roots of violence ===
In his essay "Roots of Violence: Jīva, Life and Other Things", Singh tries to look for the basic causes of violence among living beings, including humans, and pinpoints three such causes. The first and the most fundamental cause, according to him, is related to the nature of jīva or the living being. Its nature is such that jīva tries to keep itself alive. For this purpose, it eats other jīvas or it kills them in self-defence. Singh cites Charles Darwin's On the Origin of Species to assert that even trees and plants, as living beings, indulge in this kind of behaviour by denying food to other trees and plants, of their own species and also of other species.

From the concept of jīva, Singh moves on to a discussion of the concept of life, because there can be no jīva without life. He argues that it is not just jīva that kills or extinguishes the life in other jīvas, it is also life that extinguishes life. This is so because life itself, which resides in jīva, wants to keep itself alive. And in order to do that it propels jīva to kill and/or consume other jīvas. This means that life has an agency of its own which is independent of the agency of jīva. But it also means that, as Singh puts it, "more than the nature of jīva, it is the nature of life itself in which the roots of violence lie. For, the nature of jīva comes from the nature of life. In a way, jīva is only a vehicle through which life manifests its nature."

And here, Singh makes a novel observation about life. He says that since life is found scattered in jīvas, and therefore when one jīva is killed, it is only a piece of life that dies, there is no such entity as Life, with a capital L. In other words, "life is not that One entity that we often take it to be: there are pieces of what we call life and they are as many as there are jīvas. Further, the nature of these pieces is such that they cannot come together and become one entity."

It is due to this scattered nature of life—a scattering in which the life in one jīva is not connected with or a part of the life in other jīvas—that the life in one jīva is able to kill or extinguish the life in another jīva. And here again Singh comes up with a rather unusual view of life. According to him, what these observations show is that "what we know and revere as life cannot keep itself alive without causing death, which is the death of jīvas. Life, as such, is a harbinger of death..." It "is not that benign entity which it is held forth as being." Rather, "it is the most demonic thing around" and is the cause of "an unimaginable number of deaths...on the earth every day."

According to Singh, humans claim to be different from and superior to other jīvas due to their "'superior' ability to think." However, Singh argues that this is more or less a false claim, for this so-called ability to think has not stopped humans from killing and consuming other jīvas. In fact, due to this very ability they have become even more sophisticated killers and torturers, where the victims of their skills are not only the non-human jīvas but also the human jīvas. The only thing humans seem to have achieved through this ability is that they have stopped eating other humans. Nevertheless, they have not stopped killing them and "hurting them and other jīvas in all those innumerable ways which humans have invented."

Following from this, Singh concludes that it is not enough for humans to have the ability to think. What is also important is the kind of thinking they do and the direction in which it takes them. And here, Singh mentions a very different kind of thinking, too, that exists among humans, namely the thinking that "humans should not kill and hurt other jīvas, including their own kind." However, despite the existence of this alternative thinking, they seem to have gone further in the other direction, pointed out earlier. So that, to quote Singh:

...the thinking which leads to such complex acts of violence has, to a large degree, become disconnected from our life as jīva. And to the same degree, humans are no longer jīvas—as the non-human forms of jīva still are—but have become something other than jīva, something which is much more complex than jīva but is also much more vicious and cruel...in such a way that the 'human' in the human jīvas no longer remains human but rather becomes a monster—still retaining the human form.

According to Singh, humans have emerged as a big monster on the earth, and, in fact, they are the only monster the earth has. A factor that has intensified the effect of their monstrosity is the increase in their population in the last few centuries. "The size of their population has pushed up enormously the amount of violence they perpetrate," including the violence caused by the amount of things they use and consume, both living and nonliving. The latter, in Singh's opinion, is the second leading cause of the violence in the world. Singh believes that "whenever they are in a position to do so, humans tend to use and consume almost everything in excess, and it is this fact [which] is the most crucial in any discussion of consumption in connection with violence."

Singh makes three new and significant observations in connection with the human tendency to consume in excess. Firstly, it is a tendency "whose emergence makes humans different from other jīvas in as fundamental a way as the so-called ability to think." Secondly, the emergence of this tendency is "the most fundamental event in the evolution of human nature," and it is much more fundamental than the emergence of their ability to think. Finally, this tendency "has little connection with thinking;" under the influence of this tendency humans act fairly "blindly" and therefore it is "almost like a drive."

Another activity that humans do quite blindly is what they call the pursuit of knowledge and they have been busy pursuing the latter since ancient times. This pursuit as well as the indiscriminate use of the knowledge it produces, according to Singh, is the third basic cause of the violence on the earth.

What kind of knowledge do humans try to acquire? "It is the knowledge about the world and about things in general, both living and nonliving; knowledge about themselves, their mind and body; knowledge about histories, economies and societies."

Apparently, this knowledge is acquired for the well-being of humans. But Singh believes that this activity is motivated by all kinds of aims and purposes, including the aim of destroying other people. Further, he argues that not all the ways and means of acquiring this knowledge are benign. Moreover, this knowledge has "played a major role in damaging the earth and nature and in killing and harming the human and other jīvas, and it is still playing this role." "As such, the desire to acquire knowledge incessantly and indiscriminately, which has turned into a habit and already looks like a drive, is one more thing that holds a central place in the monstrosity of humans."

In Singh's view, a lot of human knowledge acquired under the influence of this desire is not only artificial but also excessive. It is artificial in the sense that, unlike most other jīvas, it is no longer acquired by the use of senses while living a life in nature. Rather, it is acquired through the faculty of thinking which has largely become disconnected with and distant from nature. And it is excessive in that a lot of this knowledge is not really required. Singh mentions the following examples, out of many others, to substantiate his point: "(1) the knowledge that tells humans how to make nuclear and chemical weapons; (2) the knowledge that enables them to clone animals and will possibly also enable them to clone humans; (3) the knowledge that reveals to them the sex of a foetus; (4) the knowledge that allows them to genetically modify crops and vegetables, and possibly in the future also humans; (5) even the knowledge of the inner structure of a plant, tree, or flower."

== See also ==
- Teji Grover
- List of Indian writers
