= Frank Jensen (disambiguation) =

Frank Jensen (born 1961), is a Danish politician who was mayor of Copenhagen.

Frank Jensen or Jenssen may also refer to:

- Frank Høj Jensen (born 1945), Danish sailor
- Frank Jenssen (born 1969), Norwegian politician
- Frank A. Jenssen (1952–2017), Norwegian journalist, photographer, novelist, and musician

== See also ==
- Frank Bakke-Jensen (born 1965), Norwegian politician
