= Morten Harry Olsen =

Norwegian writer (born 1960)

Morten Harry Olsen (born in 1960 in Narvik) is a Norwegian author. He made his literary debut in 1985 with the short story collection For alt hva vi er verdt, which won Tarjei Vesaas' debutantpris. Many of his books have been hits with critics.

Olsen studied criminology at the University of Oslo and philosophy at the University of Tromsø. He has worked as a travel agent, taxi driver, night porter, journalist, translator, office worker, literary critic, education consultant, and teacher. He was head of Norsk Forfattersentrum (1989–91), head of arrangements for the Brage Prize (1991–95) and deputy head of the Norwegian Authors' Union (1997–98). From 1988 to 1991 he was a member of the Norwegian Authors' Union's Literary Caucus. Between 1992 and 1996 he was editor of Bokklubben krim og spenning.

== Bibliography ==
- For alt hva vi er verdt – short stories (1985)
- Ganske enkelt sand – novel (1986)
- En dans til – short stories (1988)
- Tråder – essays (1989)
- Mississippi – novel (1990)
- Syndenes forlatelse – crime novel (1991)
- Mannen som hatet duer – play (1992)
- Begjærets pris – crime novel (1993)
- Tilfeldig utvalg – crime novel (1996)
- Naken for leseren, naken for Gud: et essay om romanen – literary criticism (1997)
- Mord og galskap – novel (2000)
- Mississippi. neo – novel (2002)
- Størst av alt – novel (2004)
- Adrian Marconi's Great Sorrow (2010)
- Skrivehåndverket - A practical Guide for Beginners (2014)

== Prizes ==
- Tarjei Vesaas' debutantpris 1985, for For alt hva vi er verdt
- Riverton Prize 1993, for Begjærets pris
- Havmannprisen 2004, for Størst av alt

Preceded by Anne Bøe	Winner of Tarjei Vesaas' debutantpris 1985	Succeeded by Sissel Lie
Preceded by Arild Rypdal	Winner of the Riverton Prize; 1993	Succeeded by Anne Holt
Preceded by Endre Lund Eriksen	Winner of the Havmannpris; 2004	Succeeded by Tor Eystein Øverås
