= Sissel Lie =

Norwegian novelist, translator, playwright and professor

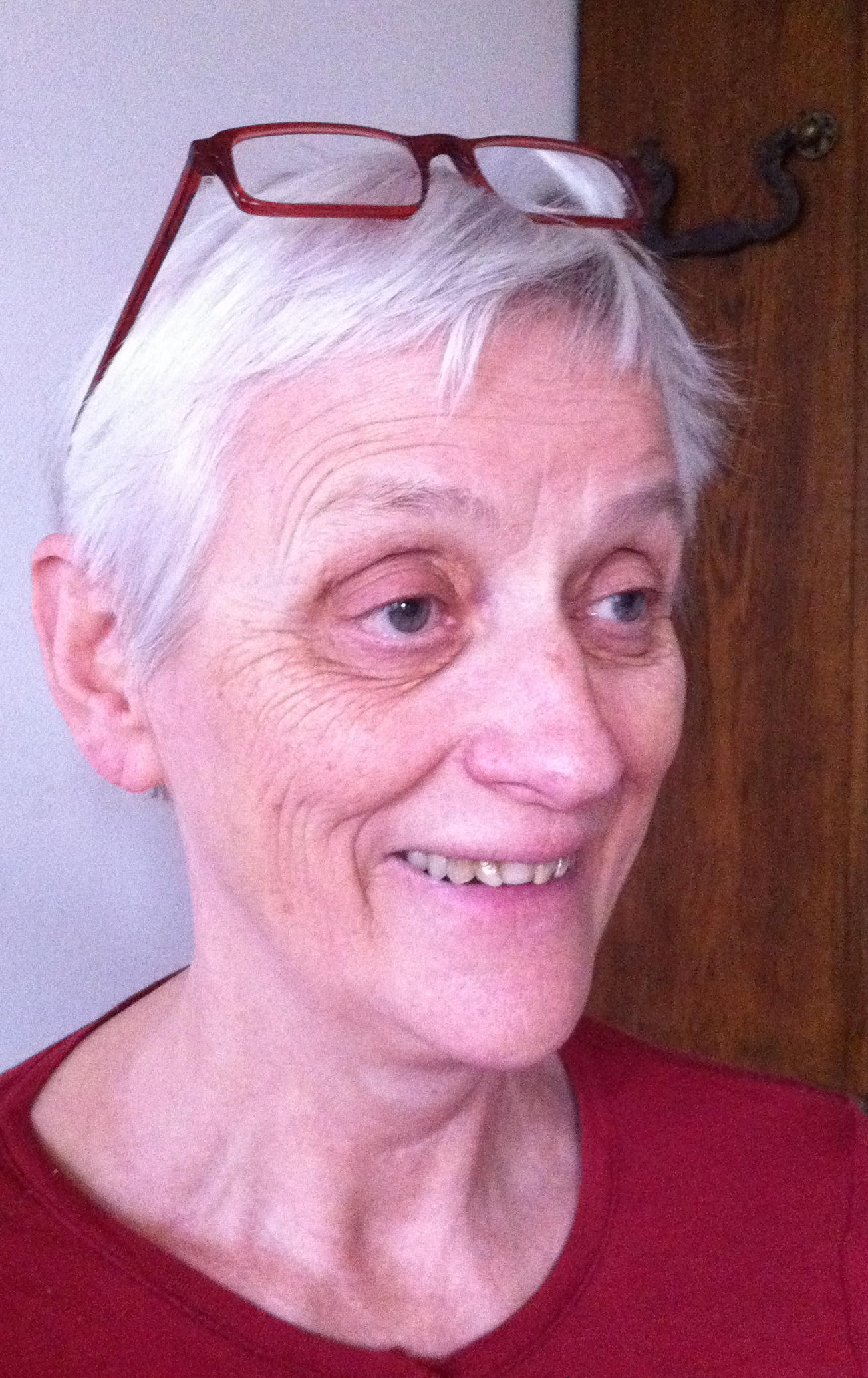
- Born: 12 November 1942 (age 83); Kristiansand, Vest-Agder, Norway
- Occupations: Novelist, translator, playwright and professor
- Writing career
- Period: 1986–present
- Genres: Short stories Novels; Drama; Children's books Non-fiction

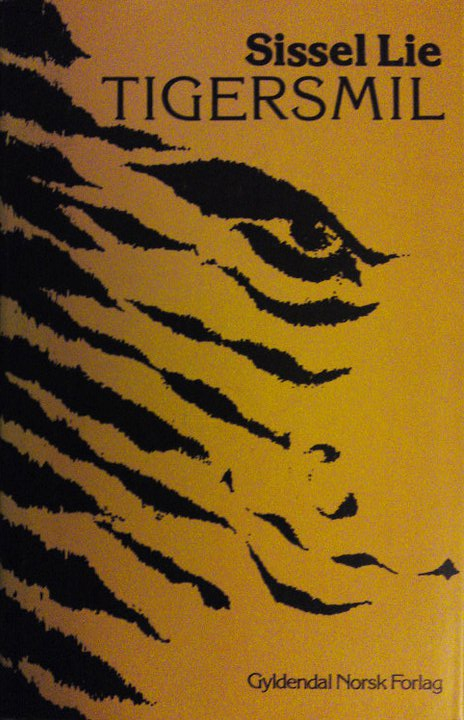
Front of "Tigersmil" (=Tiger smile) illustration by Tor M. Hetland 1986

Sissel Lie (born 12 November 1942) is a Norwegian novelist, translator, playwright and professor in Romance languages and literature at the University of Trondheim since 1992.

== Biography ==
Sissel Lie was born in Kristiansand, in Vest-Agder county, Norway. Her literary début, the short story collection Tigersmil, won Tarjei Vesaas' debutantpris for 1986. Her works have been translated into eight languages as of 2004. She has edited anthologies of French poets and translated poetry, short stories and novels from the French language. She has also been co-editor of Kvinnenes kulturhistorie (1985–1988).

== Drama ==
- Dansen, Trondheim Kunstmuseum
- Svømmersken, performed at the National Theatre (1998)

== Bibliography ==
- Tigersmil – short story anthology (1986)
- Løvens hjerte – novel (1988)
- Sjelen har intet kjønn : kvinner og kjærligheten i franske romaner på 1600-tallet og 1700-tallet – non-fiction, (1988)
- Granateple – novel, (1990)
- Reise gjennom brent sukker – novel (1992)
- Rød svane – novel, (1994)
- Pusegutten er en drittsekk – children's book, (1995) (illustrated by Kim Hiorthøy)
- Fri som foten : om å skrive fagtekster – textbook (1995)
- Pusegutten og den lille gule – children's book, (1996) (illustrated by Kim Hiorthøy)
- Pusegutten er eldst og tykkest og det har han tenkt å fortsette med! – children's book, (1997) (illustrated by Kim Hiorthøy)
- Svart due – novel, (1997)
- Bustehøner på busstur – children's book, (1998) (with Kjersti Lie, illustrated by Finn Graff)
- Pusegutter tåler nesten alt – children's book, (1999)
- Mor og Medusa : portrett av den moderne kunstneren – non-fiction, (1999)
- Jakten på jeget : blant amasoner og franske forførere – non-fiction, (2003)

== Prizes ==
- Tarjei Vesaas' debutantpris (1986) for Tigersmil
- Gyldendal's Endowment (1992)

Preceded by Morten Harry Olsen	Winner of Tarjei Vesaas' debutantpris 1986	Succeeded by Aagot Vinterbo-Hohr
