= Gabriel Gudding =

American poet, essayist, and translator

- Occupations: Poet, Essayist, Translator,
- Known for: Experimental poetry

Academic background
- Education: The Evergreen State College<bt>Purdue University; Cornell University

Academic work
- Discipline: English, Poetry, Poetics
- Institutions: Illinois State University

Gabriel Gudding is an American poet, essayist, and translator.

== Life ==
Gudding attended The Evergreen State College, an experimental school in Olympia, Washington, Purdue University and Cornell University. He is Professor of English in the English Studies Department at Illinois State University in Normal, Illinois where he was hired to teach experimental poetry writing and poetics. His work has been translated into French, Danish, Portuguese, Vietnamese and Spanish.

Gudding is the author of the books, Literature for Nonhumans (Ahsahta Press, 2015), Rhode Island Notebook (Dalkey Archive, 2007), and A Defense of Poetry (University of Pittsburgh Press), which won the 2001 Agnes Lynch Starrett Prize.

He has given hundreds of poetry readings and lectures in Europe, the Caribbean, and America. He has published poems and essays in periodicals such as Harper’s Magazine, The Nation, and The Journal of the History of Ideas. His poetry appears dozens of anthologies, including Best American Experimental Writing (Wesleyan, 2016), &Now: Best Innovative Writing (2010), Best American Poetry (Scribner, 2010) and Great American Prose Poems: From Poe to the Present (Scribner).

His translations from Spanish appear in anthologies such as The Oxford Book of Latin American Poetry (Oxford UP), Poems for the Millennium (University of California Press), and The Whole Island: Six Decades of Cuban Poetry (University of California Press)

Gudding has a daughter named Clio. Gudding practices vipassana meditation in the tradition of Sayagyi U Ba Khin (as taught by S. N. Goenka).

== Books ==
A recipient of The Nation Discovery Award, Gudding received the Agnes Lynch Starrett Poetry Prize from the University of Pittsburgh Pitt Poetry Series for his first book A Defense of Poetry.

Gudding's second book of poetry, Rhode Island Notebook, was published in November 2007 by Dalkey Archive Press. Rhode Island Notebook is a 436-page poem interlarded with essays. It was written in Gudding's car on the highways between Normal, Illinois, and Providence, Rhode Island, during 26 roundtrip journeys, and has been called by the polymathic writer and artist Alan Sondheim, "the first 21st Century classic."

Ahsahta Press published Gudding's third book, Literature for Nonhumans, in 2015.

Friends with Everybody, Gudding's translation of Venn med alle (2018) by Norwegian poet Gunnar Wærness, was published in 2024 by Action Books.

== Selected online publications ==
- "Praise to the Swiss Federation", Harper's, August 2008
- "Ecopoetry, Speculative Ontology, and the Disavowal of the Slaughterhouse: Some Notes on Ethics and Capital", Matter: A Journal of Political Poetry and Commentary, May 2013
- "Et qu'est-ce, amis, qu'on appelle une route?", Myopies, #1, translated by Guillaume Fayard, January 2009
- "The Genotype/Phenotype Distinction and the Disappearance of the Body." Journal of the History of Ideas. July 1996.
- "A Defense of Poetry", Wild Honey Press,
- "My Buttocks" and "To Roosevelt" (a translation of Rubén Darío's "A Roosevelt"), Maximum Post-Avant
- "The Tuning Fork of St. Louis", St. Louis Magazine
- "Minnesota," "No, Popsickle," "An Ditch," "Dear Eagles" and "Literary Narcissism and the Manufacture of Scandal", Seven Corners, 5 April 2006
- "And What, Friends, is Called a Road" Action Yes.
- "Congratulations on Being Here", Eoagh. Issue 5.
- "On Kindness and Hipness as They Relate to Cultural Production", Octopus Magazine, Issue 9
- "[The Parenthesis Inserts Itself into the Transcripts of the Committee on Un-American Activities]" Jacket #7
- "How I Caught My Cold" The American Poetry Review (APR), March/April 2001, Vol. 30, No. 2
- "Praise to the Swiss Federation," and "To the Sun at Anchor", GutCult

== Online interviews ==
- "The Dangerfield Conundrum: A Roundtable on Humor in Poetry" - George Bowering, Maxine Chernoff, Katie Degentesh, Gabriel Gudding, Rachel Loden, Ange Mlinko, K. Silem Mohammad, D. A. Powell, Ron Silliman, Gary Sullivan Jacket 33 (July 2007).
- "Prison Education" (radio interview with Danny Hajek on teaching in prisons).
- Interview on Creative Writing Pedagogy, MiPOesias.
- P. F. S. Post—Maximum Post Avant (Waxing Hot), Gabriel Gudding and Adam Fieled.
- Here Comes Everybody, Lance Phillips, 18 June 2005.
- Ray Bianchi, Chicagopostmodernpoetry.com.
- Andy Zeigert, "Face to Face: Gabriel Gudding", The Ball State Daily News Online, 7 February 2005.

== Audio files ==
- Gabriel Gudding: PennSound.
- Series A Reading with Tony Barnstone and Tony Trigilio, March 25, 2008.

== Selected online reviews ==
- Peter O'Leary. "On Gabriel Gudding's Rhode Island Notebook."The Cultural Society.
- Jasper Bernes. "Revulsion as Revolt." Review of Lara Glenum and Gabriel Gudding's first books. Jacket.
- Levi Stahl. "The Five Minute Muse: George Oppen, Gabriel Gudding, and Campbell McGrath - The Off-The-Cuff Art of the Poet's Notebook." Poetry Foundation.
- Dorothy Barresi. "Playing in the Dark: Black Humor in Poetry." Poetry Daily.
- Stephen Burt. "New Poets on the Block: Gabriel Gudding." Boston Review.
- Giles Goodland, "Short Reviews of Recent Titles: Gabriel Gudding, Rhode Island Notebook": Stride Magazine.
- Ray McDaniel. "A Defense of Poetry. Gabriel Gudding. U Pitt Press, 2002." The Constant Critic.
- Fred Muratori. "Gabriel Gudding. Rhode Island Notebook", Library Journal.
- Rob Telfer, "Gabriel Gudding. Rhode Island Notebook. Dalkey Archive, 2007" ,Octopus Magazine.
- Josh Corey. "Gudding, Bolaño, and the Limits of Literature." Cahiers de Corey.
- Erin McNellis, "A Sea Sewn to a Spine: Gabriel Gudding's Rhode Island Notebook", uncomplicatedly.
- Ray Bianchi, "Why The Rhode Island Notebook by Gabriel Gudding Matters",The Irascible Poet.
- Sean F. Munro. "Hyperpersonality in the Antipoem" (review of Friends with Everyone by Gunnar Wærness, translated by Gabriel Gudding) Annulet, issue 7.
