= Bjarne Rønning =

Norwegian children's writer (born 1953)

- Born: 25 October 1953 (age 72)
- Occupations: Children's writer; Football player and manager
- Awards: Tarjei Vesaas' debutantpris

Bjarne Rønning (born 25 October 1953) is a Norwegian children's writer. He made his literary début in 1977 with the children's book Bjarne Huldasons sjøreise, for which he was awarded the Tarjei Vesaas' debutantpris. He is also known as a football player and has coached Lyn and Skeid.
