= Lars Petter Sveen =

Norwegian novelist

- Born: 30 October 1981 (age 44); Fræna Municipality, Norway
- Occupation: Novelist
- Awards: Tarjei Vesaas' debutantpris (2008); Nynorsk Literature Prize (2014)

Lars Petter Sveen (born 30 October 1981) is a Norwegian novelist.

Sveen was born in Fræna Municipality. He made his literary debut in 2008 with the short story collection Køyre frå Fræna, for which he received Tarjei Vesaas' debutantpris, as well as Aschehougs debutantstipend and Sunnmørsprisen. He was awarded the Nynorsk Literature Prize in 2014, for the novel Guds barn.

Awards
Preceded by Nils Henrik Smith	Winner of Tarjei Vesaas' debutantpris 2008	Succeeded by Eivind Hofstad Evjemo and Kjersti Annesdatter Skomsvold
