= Tarjei Vesaas' debutantpris =

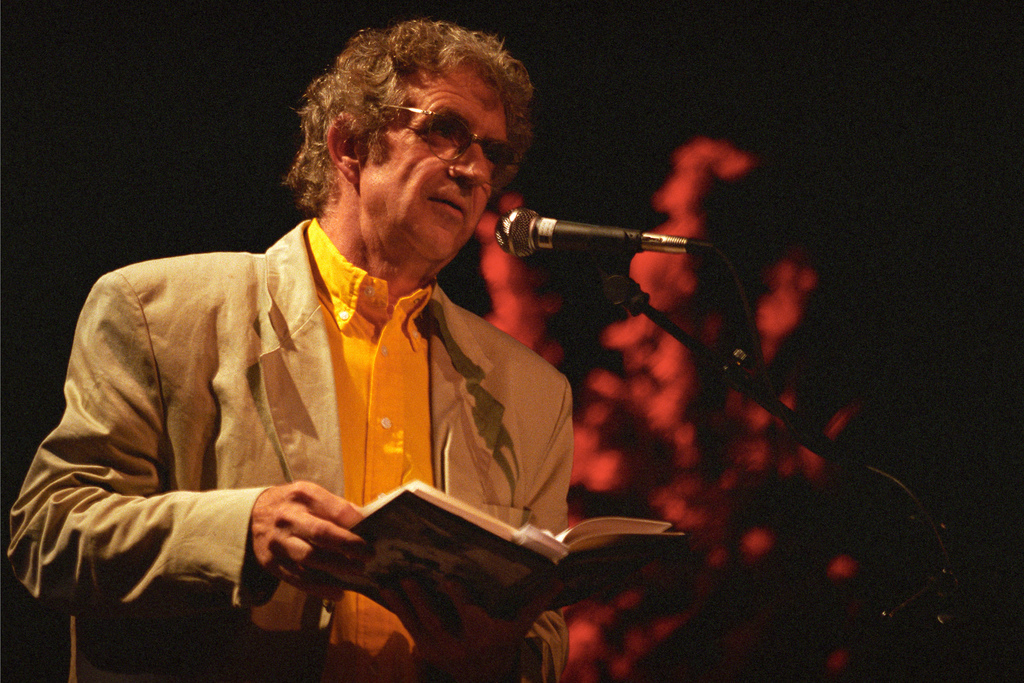
Jan Erik Vold, second winner of Tarjei Vesaas’ debutantpris

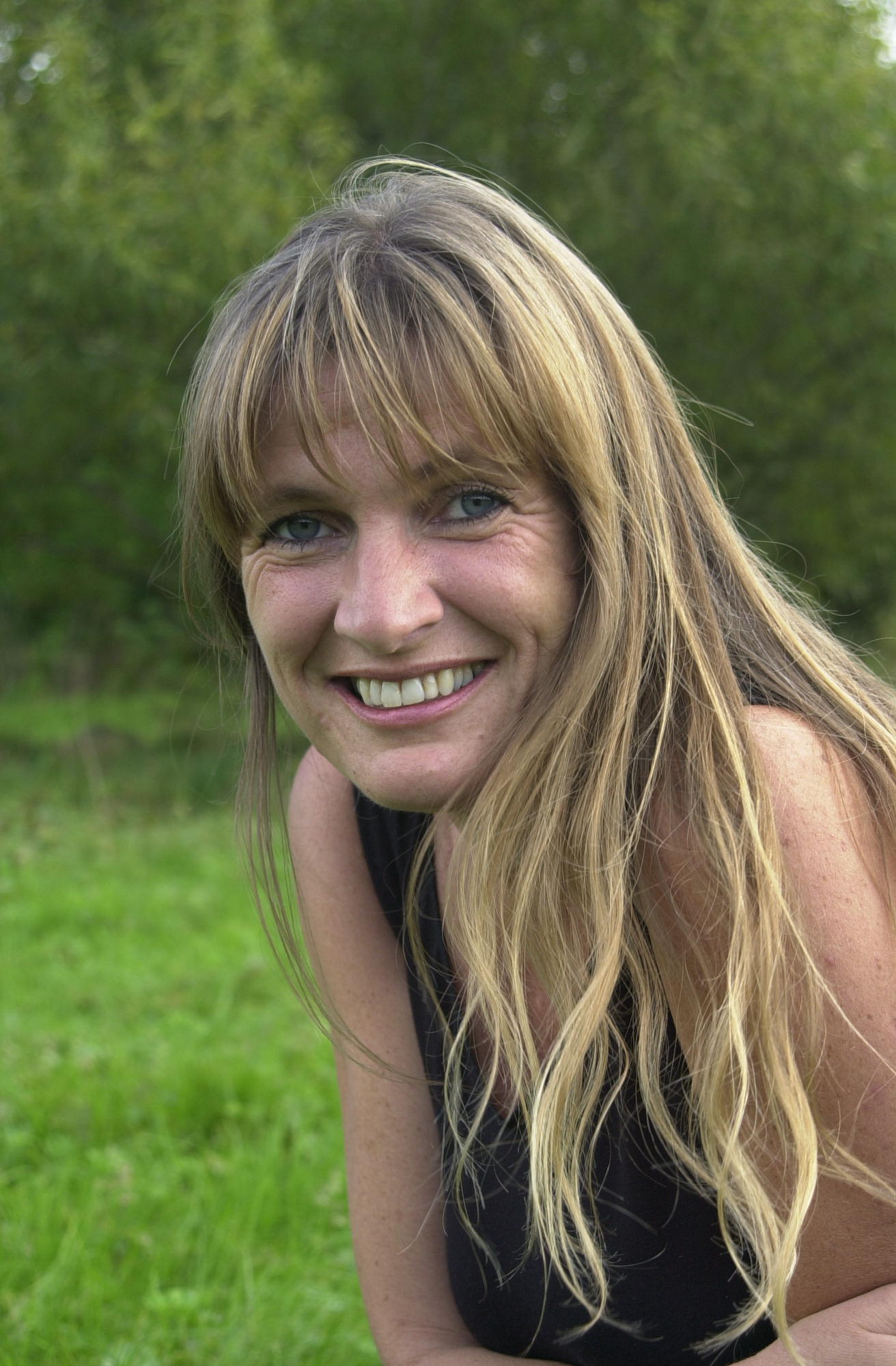
Sylvelin Vatle won the 1991 prize

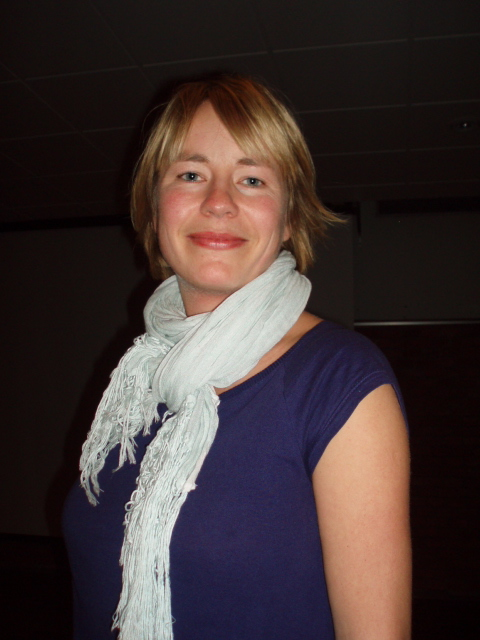
Trude Marstein won the 1998 prize

Tarjei Vesaas's debutantpris is a prize awarded annually for the best first literary work in Norwegian. It is awarded by the Norwegian Authors' Union, and the organisation's 9-member Literary Caucus constitutes the jury for the prize. They choose the winner based on a free and independent evaluation on aesthetic criteria.

In accordance with an agreement between the Authors' Union and the Norwegian Publishers' Association, all newly published Norwegian literature is sent to all members of the Literary Caucus. The members thus choose the year's winner without there being any direct application for the prize. The winner is chosen at the Literary Caucus' annual 3-day January meeting, at which the caucus performs most of the tasks within its mandate, concerning stipends, guaranteed income and prizes. The prize is usually awarded in March.

The prize was instituted in 1964 by Tarjei Vesaas with the money he received as winner of the Nordic Council's Literature Prize that year. Reflecting his intent, the literary merit of the work is the most important criterion, but if possible the prize is awarded to a young writer, 35 at the most. Vesaas and his wife Halldis Moren Vesaas (who were not themselves involved in the judging) were delighted that in its second year the prize went to Jan Erik Vold, who had been their lodger in summer 1964 at the 'writer's hut' Juvstøyl.

== Winners ==
| Year | Author | Work |
|---|---|---|
| 2022 | M. Seppola Simonsen | Hjerteskog // Syđänmettä |
| 2021 | Kristin Vego | Se en siste gang på alt vakkert |
| 2020 | Karoline Brændjord | Jeg vil våkne til verden |
| 2019 | Hanna Stoltenberg | Nada |
| 2018 | Lars Svisdal | Seg til inkjes |
| 2017 | Zeshan Shakar | Tante Ulrikkes vei |
| 2016 | Jan Kristoffer Dale | Arbeidsnever |
| 2015 | Kenneth Moe | Rastløs |
| 2014 | Amalie Kasin Lerstang | Europa |
| 2013 | Gine Cornelia Pedersen | Null |
| 2012 | Peter Franziskus Strassegger | Stasia |
| 2011 | Lina Undrum Mariussen | Finne deg der inne og hente deg ut |
| 2010 | Helga Flatland | Bli hvis du kan. Reis hvis du må |
| 2009 | Eivind Hofstad Evjemo; Kjersti Annesdatter Skomsvold | Vekk meg hvis jeg sovner Jo fortere jeg går, jo mindre er jeg |
| 2008 | Lars Petter Sveen | Køyre frå Fræna |
| 2007 | Nils Henrik Smith | Manhattan Skyline |
| 2006 | Thomas Marco Blatt | Slik vil jeg måle opp verden |
| 2005 | Mette Karlsvik | Vindauga i matsalen vender mot fjorden |
| 2004 | Ole Asbjørn Ness | Det er natt |
| 2003 | Sigmund Løvåsen | Nyryddinga |
| 2002 | Heidi Marie Kriznik | Applaus |
| 2001 | Carl Frode Tiller | Skråninga |
| 2000 | Mirjam Kristensen | Dagene er gjennomsiktige |
| 1999 | Gunnar Wærness | Kongesplint |
| 1998 | Trude Marstein | Sterk sult, plutselig kvalme |
| 1997 | Lars Ramslie | Biopsi |
| 1996 | Steinar Opstad | Tavler og bud |
| 1995 | Harald Rosenløw Eeg | Glasskår |
| 1995 | Tore Renberg | Sovende floke |
| 1994 | Cathrine Grøndahl | Riv ruskende rytmer |
| 1993 | Bertrand Besigye | Og du dør så langsomt at du tror du lever |
| 1992 | Thure Erik Lund | Tanger |
| 1991 | Sylvelin Vatle | Alle kjenner vel presten? |
| 1990 | Stein Versto | Ho blei borte i trappene |
| 1989 | Anne Grete Hollup | Maria og knivmakeren |
| 1988 | Torun Lian | Tre skuespill |
| 1987 | Aagot Vinterbo-Hohr | Palimpsest |
| 1986 | Sissel Lie | Tigersmil |
| 1985 | Morten Harry Olsen | For alt vi er verdt |
| 1984 | Anne Bøe | Silkestein |
| 1983 | Kjell Gjerseth | Chakoo |
| 1982 | Roy Jacobsen | Fangeliv |
| 1981 | Frank A. Jenssen | Saltbingen |
| 1980 | Jo Eggen | Ting og tings skygger |
| 1979 | Hans Herbjørnsrud | Vitner |
| 1978 | Sissel Solbjørg Bjugn | Den første avisa på Lofotveggen |
| 1977 | Bjarne Rønning | Bjarne Huldasons sjøreise |
| 1976 | Lars Saabye Christensen | Historien om Gly |
| 1975 | Ingvar Moe | Løktastolpefrø |
| 1974 | Karin Mathisen (Karin Fossum) | Kanskje i morgen |
| 1973 | Steinar Lem | Signaler |
| 1972 | Erling Pedersen | Rottenes konge |
| 1971 | Eivind Reinertsen | Lukk opp dørene, krigen er over |
| 1970 | Joachim Aremk (Karl Halvor Teigen) | Tapetdører |
| 1969 | Hans Sande | Strime |
| 1968 | Rolf Sagen | Dørklinker |
| 1967 | Johan Fredrik Grøgaard | Dyvekes grav |
| 1966 | Tor Obrestad | Kollisjon (poem), Vind (novellas) |
| 1965 | Jan Erik Vold | Mellom speil og speil |
| 1964 | Sigmund Jakobsen | Gjennom brend by |
