= Ingvar Moe =

Norwegian poet, novelist and children's writer

- Born: 11 December 1936; Etne Municipality, Norway
- Died: 2 September 1993 (aged 56); Trondheim, Norway
- Occupations: Poet; Novelist; Children's writer

Ingvar Moe (11 December 1936 – 2 September 1993) was a Norwegian poet, novelist and children's writer. He published more than 20 books including short stories, novels, poetry and textbooks.

== Biography ==
Ingvar Moe was born and grew up in the farming district of Etne Municipality in Sunnhordland in the county of Hordaland. His parents were baker Sigurd Moe and Brita Talette Amanda Hardeland. He graduated from the teachers' college at Stord in 1959. He worked for two decades as a teacher, principally in Nøtterøy and Nodeland.

He made his literary début in 1975 with the poetry collection Løktastolpefrø, for which he was awarded the Tarjei Vesaas' debutantpris. In 1976 he published the story collection Sommaren te Ingjeberr. Among his novels are Rundt sjøen from 1986, Forbanninga from 1988, and Kvinner mellom mørke fjell from 1990.

He worked in many genres and turn to different audiences. He wrote, in addition to poetry, short stories and novels, textbooks for primary school texts for cabaret and theater. In addition to his writing for adults, he wrote the youth novels and children's books. Moe also released an autobiographical novel, Rundt sjøen (1986). As an author of books for children, he is known for humorous books about the grandmother.

== Awards ==
- 1975 Tarjei Vesaas' debutantpris
- 1987 Melsom-prisen
- 1992 Kultur- og kirkedepartementets oversetterpris for barne- og ungdomslitteratur

== Selected works ==
=== Books of Poetry ===
- løktastolpefrø, 1975
- Fløttjevels bok, 1977
- Himabrent, 1979
- Barre litt, altså. Rime-lige dikt og songar, 1989
- Dikt i samling, 1995
- Ord om ord. Etterlatne dikt, 1996

=== Novels ===
- Rundt sjøen. Bilete frå ein barndomsstad, 1986
- Forbanninga, 1988
- Kvinner mellom mørke fjell, 1990
- Minnenes melodi. Ei bygdehore fortel, 1991
- Ulveslåtten, 1992

=== Children’s books ===
- Dei må ikkje skyta Garm, 1979
- Garm blir borte, 1981
- Heia oldemor! Ei heilt vill forteljing, 1984
- Oldemor rock! Ei nokså vill forteljing, 1985
- Oldemor og skurken, Ei endå villare forteljing, 1989
- Oldemor gifter seg. Ei heilt vill bryllaupsbok, 1993
