= Cathrine Grøndahl =

Norwegian poet (born 1969)

Cathrine Grøndahl (born 4 May 1969) is a Norwegian poet. She made her literary début in 1993 with the poetry collection Riv ruskende rytmer, for which she was awarded the Tarjei Vesaas' debutantpris. Among her other poetry collections are I klem mellom natt og dag from 1996, Det har ingenting med kjærlighet å gjøre from 1998, and Lovsang from 2003.

== Bibliography ==
- Riv, ruskende rytmer – poetry, 1994
- I klem mellom natt og dag – poetry, 1996
- Det har ingenting med kjærlighet å gjøre – poetry, 1998
- Det var da jeg flyttet – poetry, 1999
- Lov§ang – poetry, 2003
- Jeg satte mitt håp til verden – poetry, 2009
- 16 år – poetry, 2010
