= Johan Fredrik Grøgaard =

Norwegian writer

- Born: 27 October 1934; Oslo, Norway
- Died: 12 April 2025 (aged 90)
- Occupations: Dentist, novelist, children's writer and crime writer
- Writing career
- Period: 1967–20??
- Genres: Novels; Children's stories Crime stories

Johan Fredrik Grøgaard (27 October 1934, Oslo – 12 April 2025) was a Norwegian dentist, novelist, children's writer and crime writer. He made his literary debut in 1967 with the novel Dyvekes grav, for which he received Tarjei Vesaas' debutantpris. He received the Norwegian Critics Prize for Best children's book in 1982 for Jeg, Wilhem, 11 år.

Grøgaard died on 12 April 2025, at the age of 90.

== Notable works ==
- 1967: Dyveks grav
- 1971: Elefantspråket & andre dikt (The Elephant's language & other poems)
- 1972: Mannen som ikke kunne kose seg (The Man who couldn't have fun)
- 1976: Skorpionens brodd (The scorpion's brought)
- 1980: Ser Deg på TV: Fortellinger fra Norden (See you on TV: Stories from the North)
- 1982: Invitt til vellyst (Invended to the will)
- 1982: Jeg, Wilhelm, 11 år (Me, Wilhelm, age 11)
- 1989: Jan Erik Vold, 50
- 2010: Kong Rad, eller Professor Andresens ratt (King Rad, or Professor Andresen's line)

Awards
Preceded by Tor Obrestad	Winner of Tarjei Vesaas' debutantpris 1967	Succeeded by Rolf Sagen
