= Rolf Sagen =

Norwegian writer (1940–2017)

Rolf Sagen (21 December 1940 – 6 April 2017) was a Norwegian author. He was curator and daily leader of the Bergen Academy of Writing.

He wrote novels, short stories, scripts and children's books. He debuted in 1968 with the poetry collection Dørklinker, which won Tarjei Vesaas' debutantpris. In 1976, he won the Norwegian Critics Prize for Literature for the novel Mørkets gjerninger.

Sagen died on 6 April 2017.

== Bibliography ==
- Dørklinker – poetry collection, (1966)
- Kvengedal – collage, (1970)
- Mørkets ugjerninger – novel, (1976)
- Mercedesryttaren – documentary novel, (1988)
- Reisa til Leit – children's book, (1989)
- Lyden av vatn – novel, (1990)
- Sauenes liv – picture book, (1994)
- Den gongen eg var elvefiskar – picture book, (1995)
- Kjærasten min og andre dikt for store og små – poetry collection, (1996)
- Bergfri og Kakaoen leitar etter morfar – picture book, (1997)
- Bergfri og epleslangen – picture book, (1998)
- Bergfri og kattungen – picture book, (1999)
- Sørgedans – poetry, (2000)
- Hundre bønder – documentary novel, (2001)
- Reisa til D. – short story collection, (2002)
- Steinar Foten og vekkarmannen – children's book, (2002)
- Skog – novel, (2004)

== Prizes ==
- Tarjei Vesaas' debutantpris, 1968, for Dørklinker
- Norwegian Critics Prize for Literature 1976, for Mørkets gjerninger
- Samlagsprisen 2003

Awards
Preceded by Johan Fredrik Grøgaard	Winner of Tarjei Vesaas' debutantpris 1968	Succeeded by Hans Sande
