= Karl Halvor Teigen =

Norwegian psychologist

Karl Halvor Teigen (born 1941) is a Norwegian psychologist.

He was born in Oslo and took the cand.psychol. degree in 1966. He was first a professor of psychology at the University of Tromsø from 1991, then at the University of Oslo from 2001. He is especially known for his book En psykologihistorie on the history of psychology. He is a member of the Norwegian Academy of Science and Letters.

Teigen also received the Tarjei Vesaas' debutantpris in 1970 for the book Tapetdører. In 2011 he received an Ig Nobel Prize for the article "Er et sukk bare et sukk?" (English: Is a Sigh Merely a Sigh?").

Awards
Preceded by Hans Sande	Winner of Tarjei Vesaas' debutantpris 1970	Succeeded by Eivind Reinertsen
