= Kjersti Annesdatter Skomsvold =

Norwegian author (born 1979)

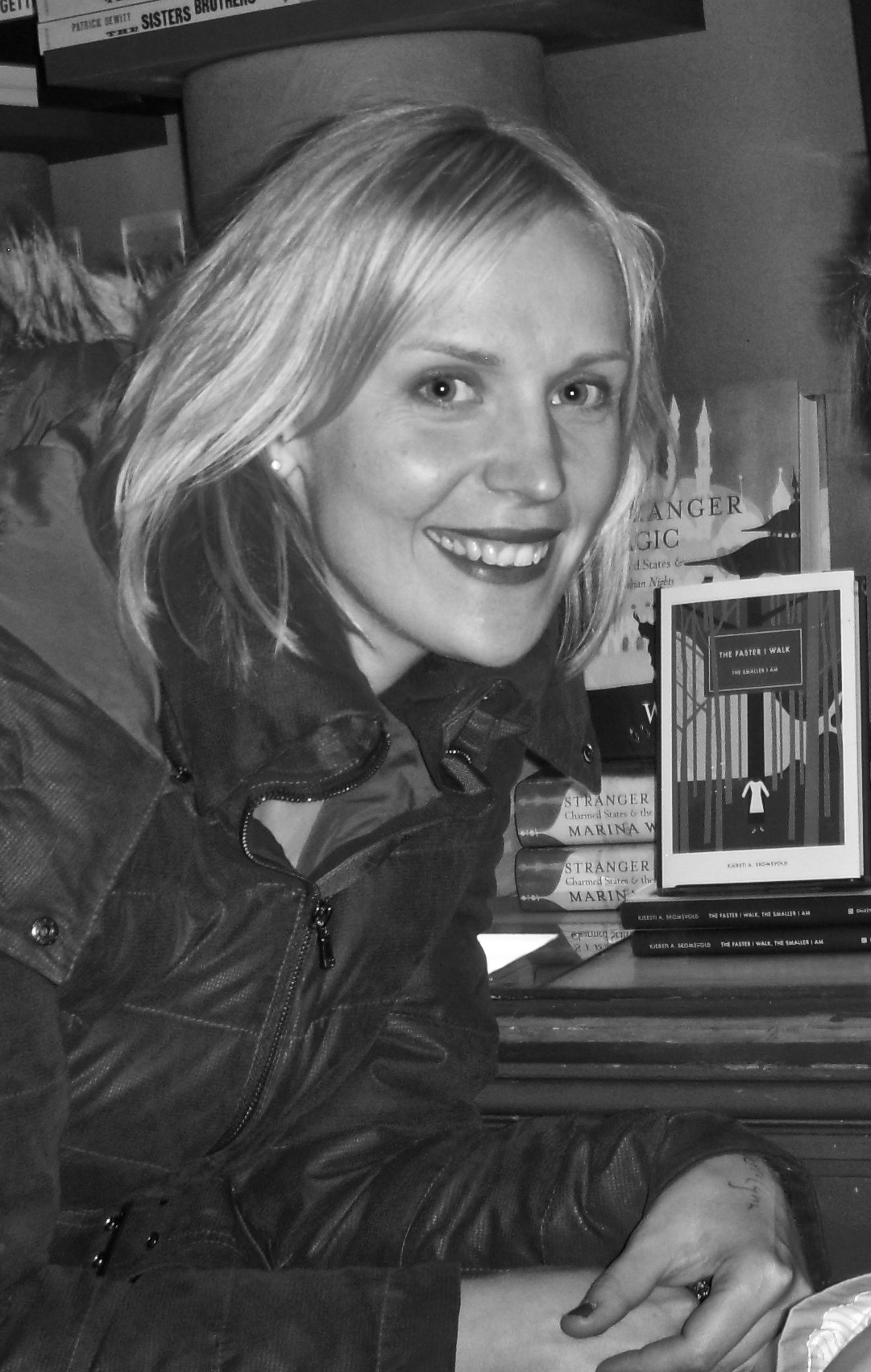
- Born: 3 December 1979 (age 46); Oslo, Norway
- Occupations: Author, novelist
- Writing career
- Genre: Fiction

Kjersti Annesdatter Skomsvold (born 3 December 1979 in Oslo) is a Norwegian author who made her literary debut in 2009 with the novel Jo fortere jeg går, jo mindre er jeg (The Faster I Walk, the Smaller I Am). The book won the Tarjei Vesaas' Debutant Prize (judged by The Literary Council of The Norwegian Authors´ Union), and it was shortlisted for the International Dublin Literary Award 2013. Skomsvold has dramatized the novel and the play premieres at the National Theatre (Oslo) in 2014.

She has since written a poetry collection and several novels. Skomsvold's books are translated into more than twenty languages.

Kjersti Annesdatter Skomsvold has also published several essays, short stories and poems in anthologies and literary magazines. She is on the editorial board of the literary magazine Bokvennen litterært magasin.

Skomsvold studied mathematics and computer science at the University of Oslo and at the Norwegian University of Science and Technology in Trondheim. Subsequently, she attended the Writers´ Class at the Nansen Academy in Lillehammer and completed studies at the Academy of Writing in Bergen. She has also studied literature at the University of Oslo, and French at Université de Caen Basse-Normandie, France.

== Bibliography ==
- 2023: Syke søster (novel)
- 2021: Agnes natt og dag - Agnes Night and Day (novel)
- 2021: Dyrene sover – The Animals Sleep (children's book), with Mari Kanstad Johnsen
- 2020: I dag jeg, i morgen du - Today Me, Tomorrow You (novel)
- 2019: Den andre forsvinninga - The Second Disappearance (non-fiction)
- 2018: Barnet - The Child (novel)
- 2015: Meg, meg, meg - Me, me, me (children's book)
- 2014: 33 (novel)
- 2014: Jo fortere jeg går, jo mindre er jeg - The Faster I Walk, the Smaller I Am (novel)
- 2013: Litt trist matematikk - A Little Sad Mathematics (poetry)
- 2012: Monstermenneske - Monsterhuman (novel)
- 2009: Jo fortere jeg går, jo mindre er jeg - The Faster I Walk, the Smaller I Am (novel)
- 2009: Stille når gruppe - Quiet When Group (editor)

== Awards ==
- 2009: Tarjei Vesaas' Debutant Prize
- 2015: Dobloug Prize

Awards
Preceded by Lars Petter Sveen	Winner of Tarjei Vesaas' debutantpris 2009 (shared with Eivind Hofstad Evjemo)	Succeeded by Helga Flatland
