= Anne Grete Hollup =

Norwegian novelist, playwright and children's writer

- Born: 29 March 1957 (age 69); Mo i Rana, Norway
- Occupation: Writer

Anne Grete Hollup (born 29 March 1957 in Mo i Rana, Helgeland) is a Norwegian novelist, playwright and children's writer. She made her literary début in 1989 with the novel Maria og knivmakeren, for which she was awarded the Tarjei Vesaas' debutantpris. The novel treats a violent marriage. Later novels are Forandringer from 1990, and Celias kjærlighet from 1994. Among her children's books is Tyven from 1993, and Du skal ikke lyve from 1995.
