= Jo Eggen =

Norwegian poet

- Born: 26 April 1952 (age 74)
- Occupation: Poet
- Awards: Tarjei Vesaas' debutantpris

Jo Eggen (born 26 April 1952) is a Norwegian poet. He made his literary début in 1980 with the poetry collection Ting og tings skygger, for which he was awarded the Tarjei Vesaas' debutantpris. He published the collection Stavkirkedikt in 2010.
