= Sylvelin Vatle =

Norwegian novelist and children's writer (born 1957)

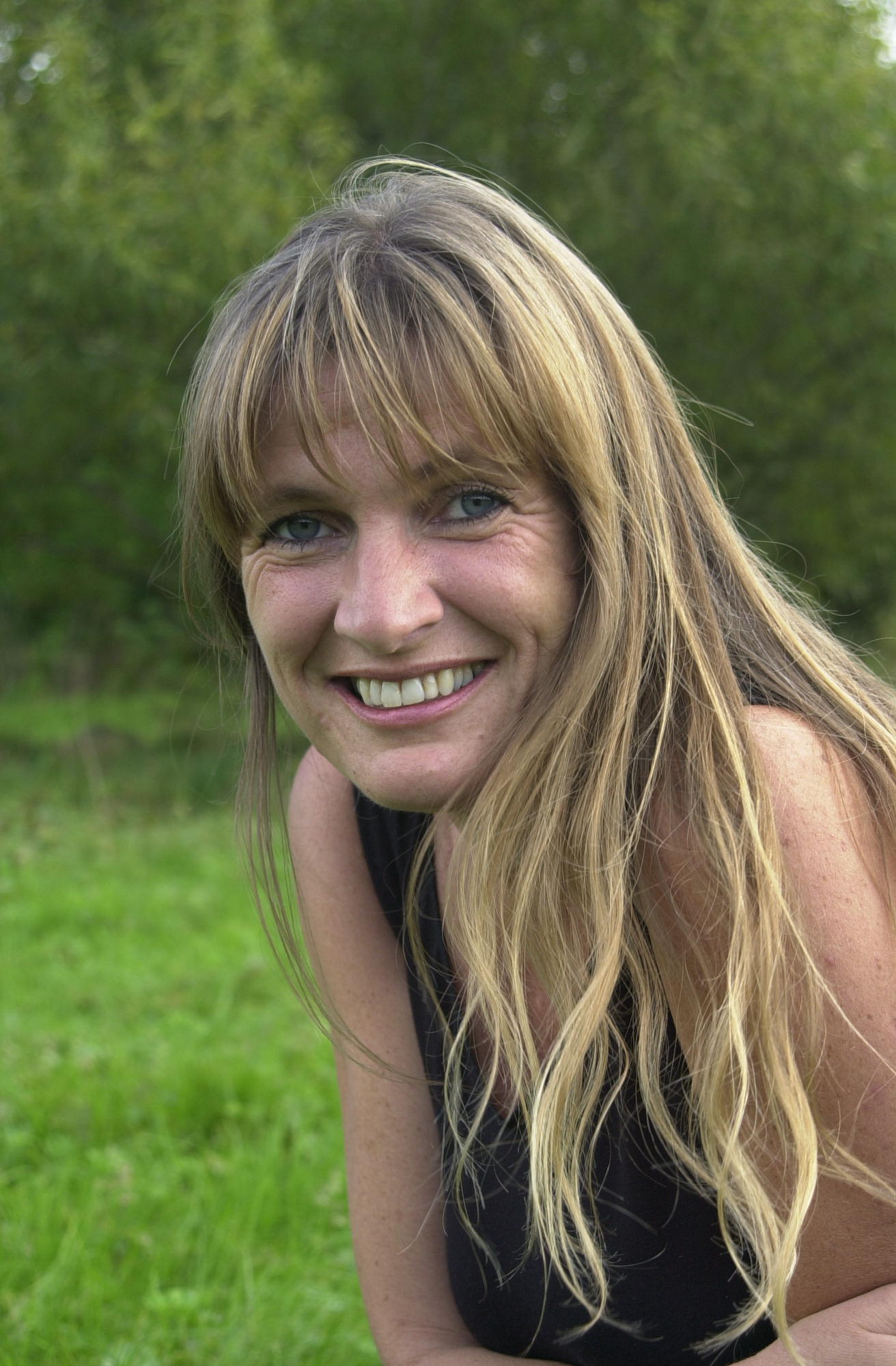
- Born: 4 September 1957 (age 68); Bergen, Norway
- Occupation: Writer
- Writing career
- Period: 1988–present
- Genres: Novels and children's stories

Sylvelin Vatle (born 4 September 1957) is a Norwegian novelist and children's writer.

== Life and career ==
Born in Bergen on 4 September 1957, Vatle grew up in Osterøy. She made her literary début in 1991 with the novel Alle kjenner vel presten?, for which she was awarded the Tarjei Vesaas' debutantpris. Her next novels were Bent Skute from 1993, and Den åttande dagen from 1996. Further novels are Ville liljer from 2000, and Mørket bak Gemini from 2002.

Among her children's books are Topphemmelig dagbok for Lars from 1998, and Tim Brentloffs eventyr from 2003.
