= Steinar Lem =

Norwegian environmental activist (1951–2009)

Steinar Henning Lem (9 May 1951 – 28 April 2009) was a Norwegian environmental activist, author and spokesperson for Fremtiden i våre hender (Future In Our Hands), Norway's largest movement for comprehensive social change. He criticized the consumption-oriented society and focus on economic growth, and the difference in income between the rich and poor parts of the world. He also supported better preservation of predators in Norway, like the wolf. Lem died aged 57 from pancreatic cancer at Aker University Hospital in Oslo, two months after it was diagnosed. He had a wife and two daughters.

== Environmentalism ==
Lem joined The Future In Our Hands in the 1970s, fronting an organization demanding higher fuel prices, higher taxation and increased aid to developing countries. In 1994, he was a strong opponent in the European Union membership referendum, but in the 2000s, he stated that he had come to favor Norwegian membership, since he felt the EU was better at solving environmental issues than the Norwegian authorities. He has also criticized the Norwegian authorities' immigration policy. In the last few weeks of his life, he stated that he would like more public debate about death.

== Authorship ==
Lem studied at the University of Oslo for a master's degree in literature. He was awarded Tarjei Vesaas' debutantpris for his first book, Signaler, in 1973.

=== Bibliography ===
- Signaler – compilation (1973)
- Utenfor bymuren – short stories (1975)
- Motlys – novel (1977)
- Grenseovergang – novel (1979)
- Bjørneboes menneskesyn i Frihetens øyeblikk – thesis (1981)
- Den tause krigen (1994)
- Det lille livet (2005)
