= Aagot Vinterbo-Hohr =

Norwegian Sami physician and writer (born 1936)

- Born: 2 December 1936 (age 89); Måsøy, Norway
- Occupations: Physician and writer

Aagot Vinterbo-Hohr (born 2 December 1936) is a Norwegian Sami physician and writer.

== Biography ==
Born in Måsøy Municipality in Finnmark county on 2 December 1936, Vinterbo-Hohr made her literary début in 1987 with the text collection Palimpsest, for which she was awarded the Tarjei Vesaas' debutantpris. In an essay on indigenous peoples of Northern Europe, Britt Rajala and Kirsten Thisted described Palimpsest as a book being both intellectual and reflective, “at once international and yet clearly Sami”.

She published the poetry collection Kjærlighetsfuge in 1991.

As literary researcher in her late seventies, in 2013 Vinterbo-Hohr delivered her dr. thesis ...ein Herz, das zu genesen fürchtet. Goethes Wahlverwandtschaften in 21. Jahrhundert gelesen.
