= Dag Herbjørnsrud =

Norwegian-born historian of ideas (born 1971)

External image
- Portrait

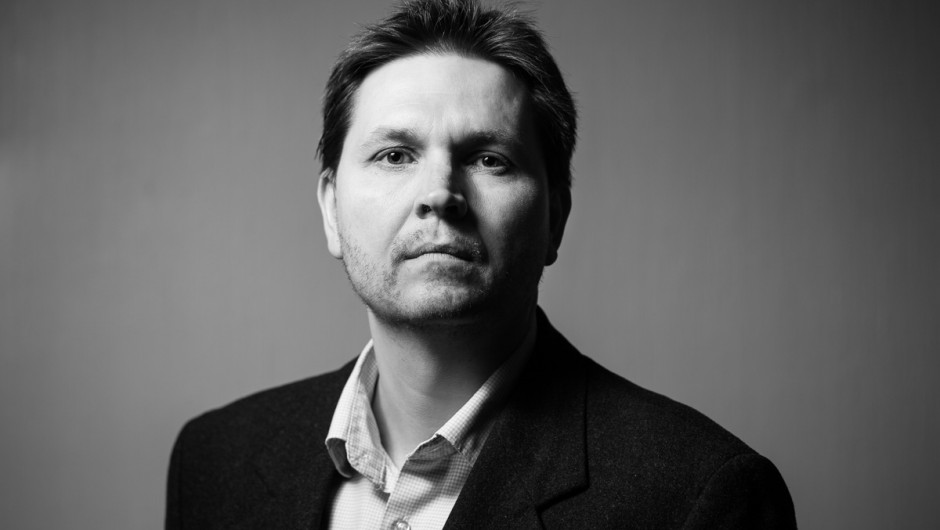
Dag Herbjørnsrud. Photo: Sebastian Dahl, 2015. Wikicommons

Dag Herbjørnsrud (born 1971) is a historian of ideas, author, a former editor-in-chief, and a founder of Center for Global and Comparative History of Ideas (Senter for global og komparativ idéhistorie, SGOKI) in Oslo. His writings have been published by Aeon, the American Philosophical Association (APA), Dialogue and Universalism, Cosmopolis, etc., and he was formerly a columnist for Al Jazeera English. Herbjørnsrud was the guest editor of a special issue of the bilingual journal Cosmopolis (Brussels), on "Decolonizing the Academy"; one of his contributors was the author and Professor Ngũgĩ wa Thiong'o. He sits on the Editorial Review Board of the book series Global Epistemics at Rowman & Littlefield.

In the Norwegian book "Global Knowledge" (Globalkunnskap, 2016), and in an essay on the blog of the Journal of the History of Ideas (JHI), Herbjørnsrud argues for the need of a "global history of ideas" and for the importance of the discipline global intellectual history. His subsequent articles covers topics such as the Hatata of the rational Ethiopian philosopher Zera Yacob and the philosophy of Anton Wilhelm Amo from Ghana ("The African Enlightenment", 2017), the women philosophers of the Global South, the Battle of Vienna, the philosophy of ancient Egypt, and the thinking of pre-colonial Mesoamerica (Nahua/Maya), in addition to the atheist/secular philosophy of India (Carvaka/Lokayata) and its influence on Europe from the late 16th century. Herbjørnsrud has delivered lectures on global perspectives, Eurocentrism, and decolonizing the Academy at institutions like the University of Cambridge, Royal Holloway (University of London), Martin Luther University Halle-Wittenberg (Germany), and Berliner Festspiele. In 2021, he delivered the inaugural lecture ("Redefining the Canon") in the "Decolonizing Knowledge" series by Quantum Bio Lab (QBL) at Howard University, and in 2023 the introduction lecture to the new series on African philosophy at the Federal University of Rio Grande do Sul, Brazil.

In May 2019, the paper "Beyond decolonizing: global intellectual history and reconstruction of a comparative method" was published online by the journal Global Intellectual History. Here, Herbjørnsrud proposed a global comparative method for the discipline, based on the three concepts of "context, connection, and comparison." The article became the most read article in the journal, and it is "[i]n the top 5% of all research outputs scored by Altmetric." In the Winter 2021 issue of The Review of Higher Education (Johns Hopkins University Press), the Texas State University scholars Z. W. Taylor and Richard J. Reddick cited the paper, and they wrote: "As higher education has rapidly globalized in the past few decades (Altbach, 2016), institutional leaders of higher education could have their theory of intellectual reconstruction informed by Herbjørnsrud’s (2019) argument for an interconnected, global perspective of cultures, people, and their histories. (...) Extending and synthesizing the work of Crozier (1901), Dewey (1920), W.E.B. Du Bois and Gates Jr. (2010), Hann and Hart (2011) and Herbjørnsrud (2019), the following section will forward a theory of intellectual reconstruction specifically for institutional leaders of higher education and their many educational stakeholders. (...) At the center of the theory is Herbjørnsrud’s (2019) emphasis on adopting a global comparative perspective (...)"

Herbjørnsrud was the editor-in-chief of the Norwegian weekly left-wing news magazine Ny Tid from 2005 to 2015; formerly (1995-2005) a reporter and op-ed-writer for the conservative newspaper Aftenposten. As an editor of Ny Tid and responsible for its "Without Borders" ("Uten grenser") column, Herbjørnsrud was responsible for contacting the paper's columnists; like Anna Politkovskaya (Russia), Nawal El Saadawi (Egypt), Irshad Manji (Canada), Elena Milashina (Russia), Marta Beatrize Roque (Cuba), Parvin Ardalan (Iran), Tsering Woeser (Tibet) and Ethel Kabwato (Zimbabwe). Herbjørnsrud contributed to the production of the TV and Netflix thriller Occupied (2015), in which he ("editor Dag") was played by the actor Øystein Røger. He is the son of writer Hans Herbjørnsrud and historian Anna Tranberg.

Herbjørnsrud is a cand. philol. of history of ideas on an English-language thesis on Robert Nozick. In the thesis, and in an interview with the liberal-conservative periodical Minerva, Herbjørnsrud stated that Nozick advocated the welfare state, and that Anarchy, State, and Utopia is not representative of Nozick's philosophy. In 2004–05, he was a columnist for Al-Jazeera's English website.

== Selected works ==
- "Preface", in: The Hatata Inquiries: Two Texts of Seventeenth-Century African Philosophy from Ethiopia about Reason, the Creator, and Our Ethical Responsibilities (Transl./Eds. Ralph Lee, Mehari Worku, Wendy Laura Belcher, and Jeremy R. Brown) (De Gruyter, 2023)
- "The Quest for a Global Age of Reason. Part I: Asia, Africa, the Greeks, and the Enlightenment Roots" and "The Quest for a Global Age of Reason. Part II: Cultural Appropriation and Racism in the Name of Enlightenment" (Dialogue and Universalism, 3/2021): https://philpapers.org/rec/HERTQF-2
- "Beyond decolonizing: global intellectual history and reconstruction of a comparative method", Global Intellectual History (Vol. 6, Issue 5, 2021, pp 614–640. Online since May 10, 2019). DOI: https://doi.org/10.1080/23801883.2019.1616310
- Gå inn i din tid. Thomas Hylland Eriksen i samtale med Dag Herbjørnsrud (Res Publica, 2019) ("Engaging with the World: Thomas Hylland Eriksen in Conversation with Dag Herbjørnsrud")
- Globalkunnskap. Renessanse for en ny opplysningstid (Scandinavian Academic Press, 2016) ("Global Knowledge. Renaissance for a New Enlightenment").
- "The Hate and Fear of America", in: Global Perspectives on the United States. Issues and Ideas Shaping U. S. International Relations (v. 3). (Berkshire Publishing Group, MA, USA, 2007).
- Leaving Libertarianism: Social Ties in Robert Nozick's New Philosophy (UiO, 2002).

In cooperation with Stian Bromark he has written three non-fiction books in Norwegian:

- Blanke løgner, skitne sannheter (Blatant Lies, Dirty Truths) (Tiden, 2002)
- Frykten for Amerika (The Fear of America) (Tiden, 2003) (Nominated for the Brage prize)
- Norge - et lite stykke verdenshistorie (Norway - A Small Piece of World History) (Cappelen, 2005)
