= Gunnar Wærness =

Norwegian poet (born 1971)

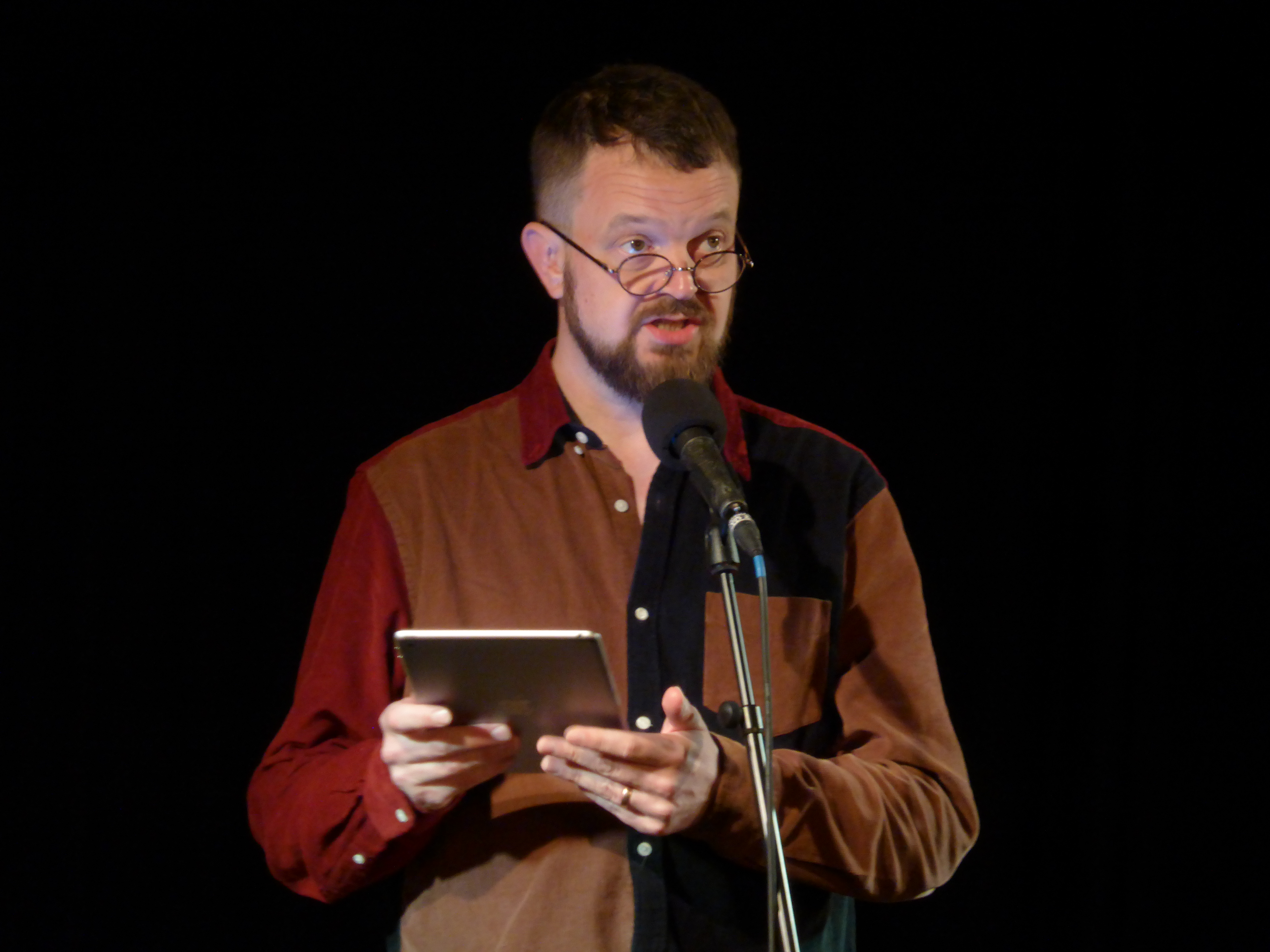
- Born: 22 November 1971 (age 54); Trondheim, Norway
- Occupation: Poet
- Writing career
- Period: 1999–present
- Genre: Poetry
- Notable awards: Dobloug Prize (2023)

Gunnar Wærness (born 22 November 1971) is a Norwegian poet. He made his literary début in 1999 with the poetry collection Kongesplint, for which he was awarded the Tarjei Vesaas' debutantpris. Among his other poetry collections are Takk from 2002 and Hverandres from 2006.

He was awarded the Dobloug Prize in 2023.

== Selected works ==
- Kongesplint. 1999. (poetry collection)
- Takk. 2002. (poetry collection)
- Hverandres. 2006. (poetry collection)
- Bli verden. 2007. (poetry collection)
- Verden finnes ikke på kartet. 2010. (poetry anthology, jointly with co-editor Pedro Carmona-Alvarez)
- Tungen og tåren. 2013. (poetry collection)
- Venn med alle. 2018. (poetry collection)
- Å skrive er å be om for mye. 2020.
- Ta på Jesus/Touch Jesus. 2021.
- Friends with Everyone (Venn med alle) translated by Gabriel Gudding, 2024.
