= Frank A. Jenssen =

Norwegian journalist, photographer, novelist and musician

- Born: 21 January 1952; Kjøpsvik, Norway
- Died: 9 June 2017 (aged 65)
- Occupations: journalist, photographer, novelist and musician

Frank Adolf Jenssen (21 January 1952 – 9 June 2017) was a Norwegian journalist, photographer, novelist and musician. He was born in Kjøpsvik. He made his literary début in 1981 with the novel Saltbingen, for which he was awarded the Tarjei Vesaas' debutantpris. He published the novel Lengselens år in 2004. He died on 9 June 2017 at the age of 65.
