= Anne Bøe =

Norwegian poet

- Born: 9 July 1956 (age 70); Ålesund, Norway
- Occupation: Poet

Anne Bøe (born 9 July 1956) is a Norwegian poet. She was born in Ålesund, and grew up partly in Tanzania. She graduated from the "writers' seminar" in Bø in 1982, where she had studied with Eldrid Lunden. She made her literary début in 1984 with the poetry collection Silkestein, for which she was awarded the Tarjei Vesaas' debutantpris. Among her later poetry collections are Ildrose from 1989, Sinobersol snø from 1993, and Minimum from 2009. Her collection Frostdokumenter from 2012 was described as giving language to people whose voices we seldom hear.

Typical for Bøe's poetry is her use of rhetorical contrasts, such as oxymoron, paradoxes and antitheses.

== Selected works ==
- Silkestein (1984, poetry)
- Ordenes kildemor (1987, poetry)
- Ildrose (1989, poetry)
- Sinobersol snø (1993, poetry)
- Ingensteds overalt (1994, poetry)
- Krigslogikkene (2001, poetry)
- Sisyfos synger (2003, poetry)
