= Hans Sande =

Norwegian psychiatrist and writer (born 1946)

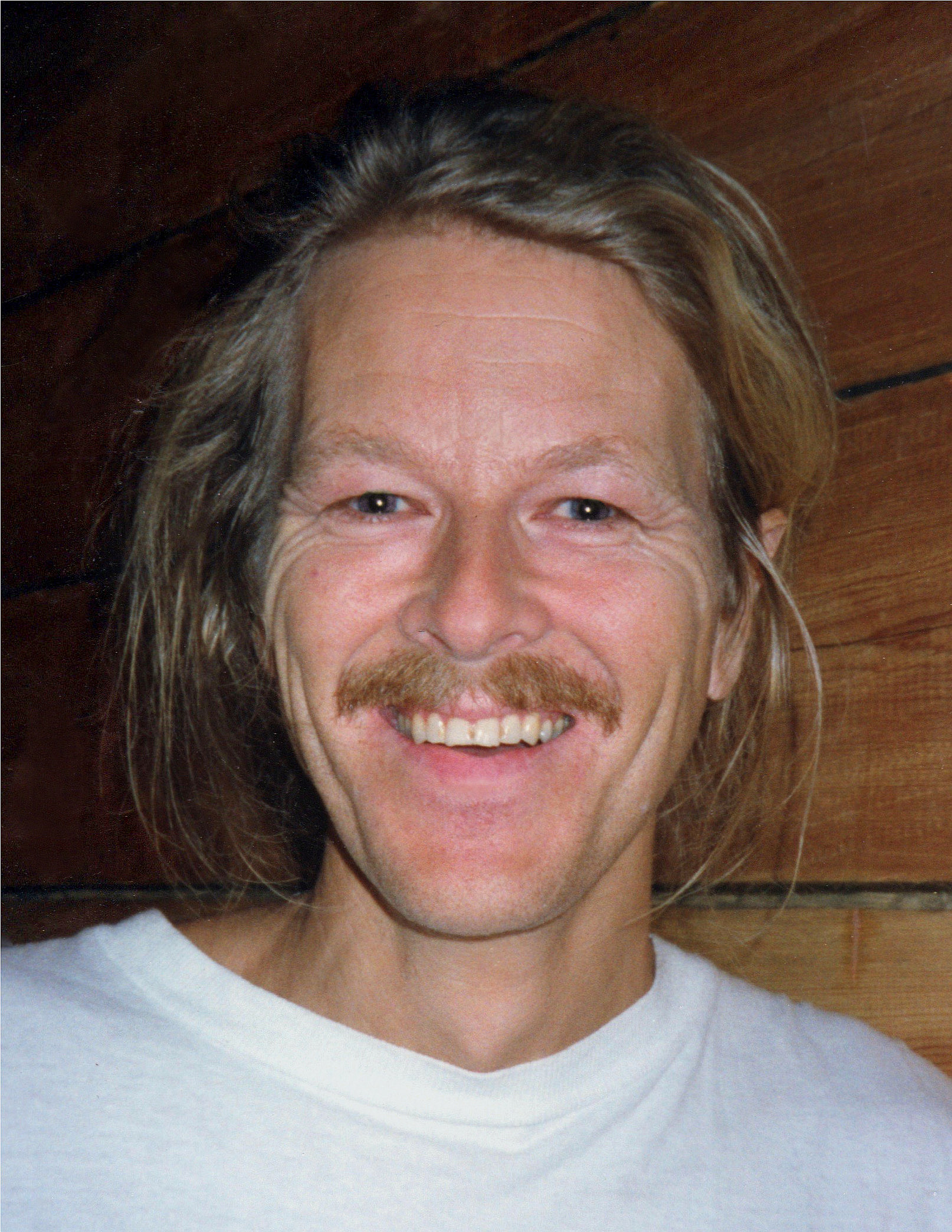
- Novelist, poet
- Born: 20 December 1946; Bergen, Norge
- Writing career
- Period: 1969 -
- Notable work: Strime
- Notable awards: Tarjei Vesaas's debutantpris
- Website: hans-sande.com

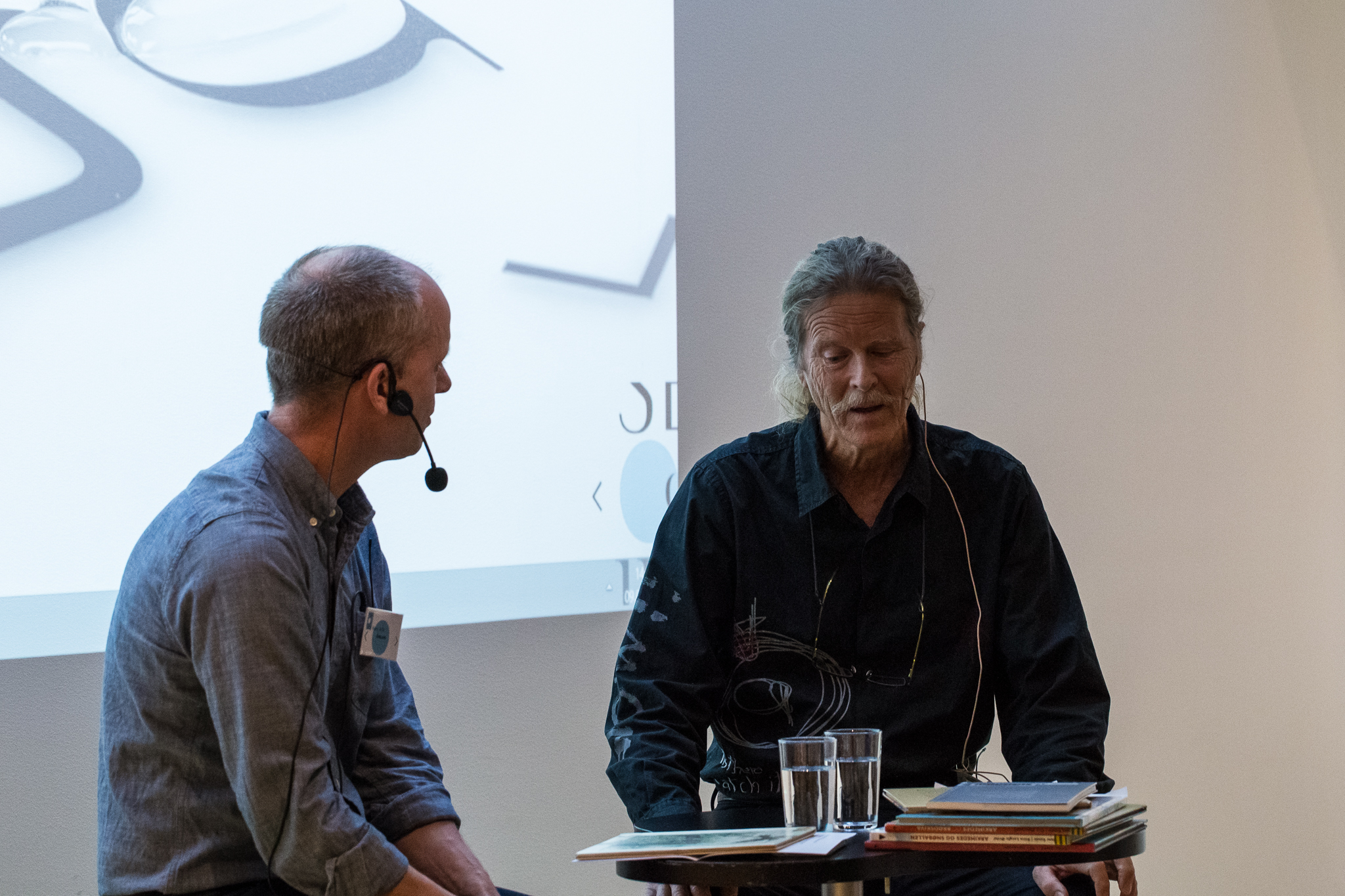
Hans Sande i samtale med Bjørn Arild Ersland

Hans Sande (born 20 December 1946) is a Norwegian psychiatrist, poet, novelist and children's writer. He was born in Bergen. He made his literary début in 1969 with the poetry collection Strime, for which he was awarded the Tarjei Vesaas' debutantpris. Among his children's books are Lita grøn grasbok from 1972 and Trastedikt from 1977.

Awards
Preceded by Rolf Sagen	Winner of Tarjei Vesaas' debutantpris 1969	Succeeded by Karl Halvor Teigen
