= Hans Herbjørnsrud =

Norwegian writer (1938–2023)

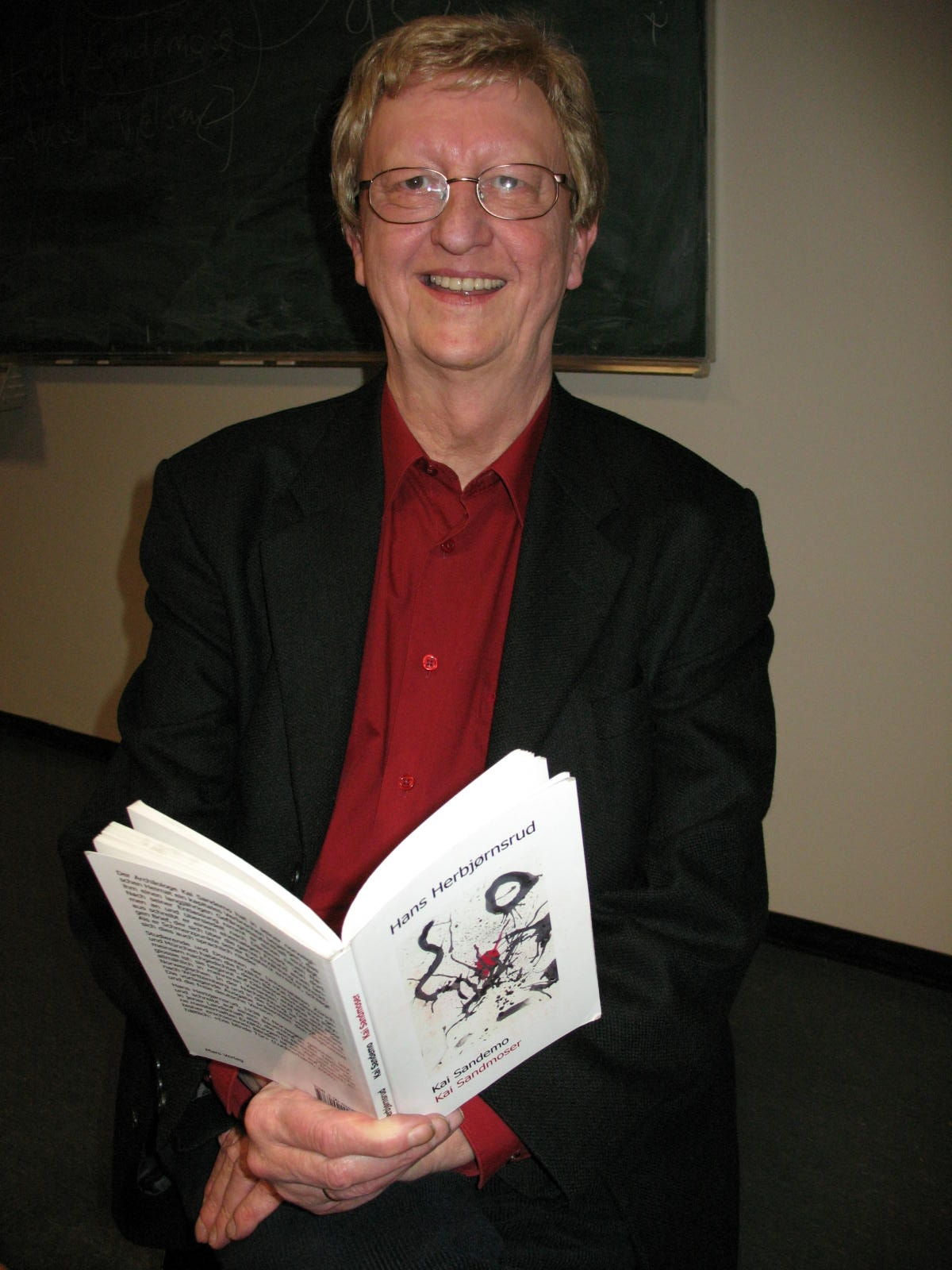
- Born: 2 January 1938; Heddal, Norway
- Died: 15 November 2023 (aged 85)
- Spouse: Anna Tranberg
- Writing career
- Genre: short stories
- Notable work: Kai Sandemo
- Notable awards: Kritikerprisen (1997); Dobloug Prize (2005)

Hans Herbjørnsrud (2 January 1938 – 15 November 2023) was a Norwegian author of short stories. His works frequently play with the differences between Norwegian languages Bokmål and Nynorsk and the various Norwegian dialects. His stories' characters sometimes playfully mix and invent languages, sometimes become caught up in their linguistic games and start losing their identity.

== Biography ==
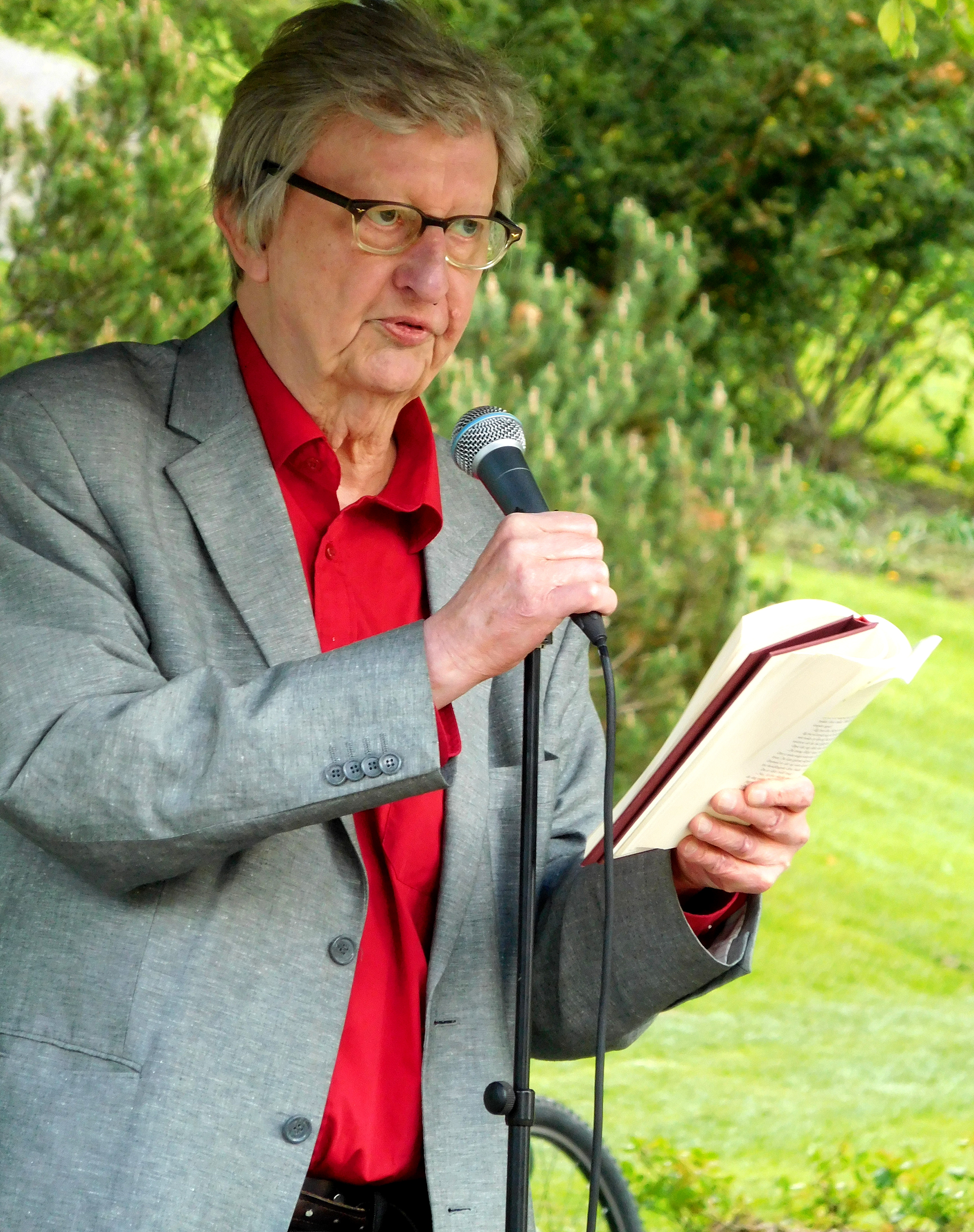
Herbjørnsrud – 2017

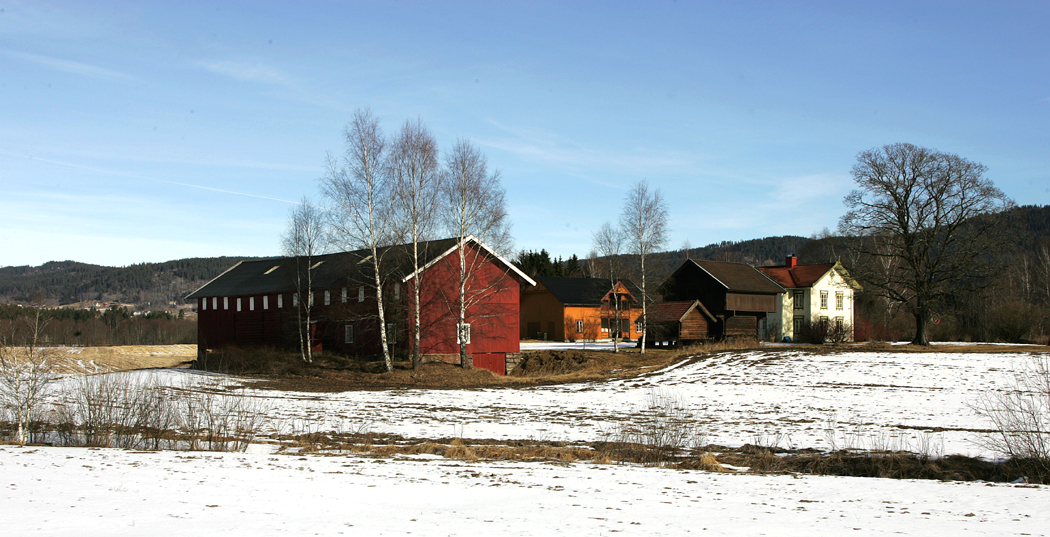
Herbjørnsrud's farm near Heddal – 2005

Hans Herbjørnsrud was born in Heddal Municipality on 2 January 1938. He grew up on a remote farm in Telemark county and became a farmer himself. After working as a teacher for some time, he started writing in his early forties and published his first collection of stories, Vitner (Witnesses), in 1979. This collection was recognized as the best literary début of the year with Tarjei Vesaas' debutantpris. Since then, he has published six more collections of stories, which have been well received by critics. Herbjørnsrud has been awarded several prizes for his work, including the prestigious Kritikerprisen in 1997, the Dobloug Prize in 2005 and Aschehougprisen in 2005. He was nominated for The Nordic Council´s Literature Prize in 1998 and 2002. In 1999 Herbjørnsrud was nominated for the European Aristeion Prize. His short stories have been translated into several languages, including German, English, French, Russian and Hindi.

Herbjørnsrud's playful mixing of dialects poses great challenges to translators; his most prolific story, Kai Sandemo (1997), has long been considered untranslatable to any other language. It tells the story of a murderer who flees his home in Telemark and settles in Denmark where he starts writing letters to people he grew up with – first in Danish, then, as he remembers more and more dark secrets of his past, gradually switching to Nynorsk, Bokmål and the dialect of Telemark until at the end, virtually every sentence becomes a complex mixture of various languages and dialects. An ambitious project undertaken by the universities of Zürich and Munich worked on a German translation of the story for several years and released a finished version in 2005. The team moved the story to Switzerland and substituted standard German, Swiss German, Romansh and various Swiss dialects for the original's languages and dialects.

Herbjørnsrud was married to Danish-born historian Anna Tranberg, former associate professor at Telemark University College in Bø. Their son, Dag Herbjørnsrud, is an author and journalist and currently an editor at the weekly news magazine Ny Tid. Hans Herbjørnsrud died on 15 November 2023, at the age of 85.

== Works ==
- Brønnene (The Fountains, 2006) ISBN 978-82-05-36064-8
- Samlede noveller (Collected Short Stories, 2003) ISBN 82-05-31274-5
- Vi vet så mye (We know so much, 2001) ISBN 82-05-27724-9
- Blinddøra (The Blind Door, 1997) ISBN 82-05-25262-9
- Eks og Sett (1992) ISBN 82-05-20699-6
- Han (Him, 1987) ISBN 82-05-17540-3
- Vannbæreren (The Water Bearer, 1984) ISBN 82-05-15039-7
- Vitner (Witnesses, 1979) ISBN 82-05-11827-2
