= Pondus =

Norwegian comic strip

The first issue of the Norwegian Pondus magazine, 4 July 2000

Pondus is a comic strip created by the Norwegian cartoonist Frode Øverli. Since its start in 1995, it has become one of the most successful comic strips in Scandinavia. It has been translated to several languages, including Danish, English, German, Finnish, French, Icelandic, Latin, Sami, Swedish and Esperanto.

In 2000 it inspired its own magazine.

== Publication history ==
Øverli initially developed a strip titled A-laget (A-team) in 1995, prior to leaving the magazine Pyton. This early version focused on three characters who were fanatical football-supporters. By the time the strip in its earliest form was first published in a small local newspaper Vest-Nytt of Sotra on 28 October 1995, it had taken the name Pondus. In 1996 it began a four-year run as a supporting strip in the Norwegian magazine devoted to Bud Grace's Ernie, leading to its breakthrough on 2 April 1997, when it was taken on as a daily strip in national distribution newspaper Dagbladet.

On 4 July 2000 it began publication in its own Pondus magazine, as the first Norwegian strip to ever carry its own monthly publication. This was followed on 6 June 2001 with the launch of a Swedish sister magazine. The strip runs daily in more than 80 Norwegian newspapers, and is syndicated to several international publications, most notably Swedish Dagens Nyheter, Danish Berlingske Tidende, and Icelandic Frettabladid.

As of 2007's first issue, Pondus magazine left publisher Schibsted to continue its run with publisher Egmont. In a simultaneous event, the character Pondus quit his job as a bus driver, and bought a pub.

Frode Øverli has twice received the Sproing Award for Pondus, in 1998 and 2003, and the Adamson Award in 2006.

== Characters ==
=== Pondus' family ===
- Pondus - the main character, a late-thirties, football fanatic family man.
- Beate - Pondus' wife.
- Påsan/Kevin - Pondus' teenage son.
- Sneipen/Frida - Pondus' baby daughter.
- Bjarne - the family's exceptionally stupid dog.

=== Jokke's family ===
- Jokke - Pondus cool friend and a former notoriously pathetic pursuer of ugly women.
- Camilla - Jokke's girlfriend, and the mother of their child. Broke up but are together now.
- Else - Jokke's mother and wife of Günther.
- Günther - Jokke's bald, German midget stepfather.
- Jacobsen - Jokke's father, a former jailbird.
- Gordon - Jokke and Camilla's baby.

=== Other characters ===
- Turid-Laila - a stunning blonde barmaid at Pondus' pub.
- Kjakan - an awkward teenager and Påsan's best friend.
- Harold & Selma - long-time friends of Beate whom Pondus find dull.
- Hugo & Ivar - two (former) colleagues of Pondus with geek interests.
- Reidar - a car mechanic of the greediest sort.
- Roger - an awful comics creator.
- Ponny-Petra - the most notorious of Jokke's female acquaintances.
- Dr. Zimmerknaben - an unorthodox psychiatrist.
- Zlatan - a black metal-guy who works in Jokke's shop.

== Publications ==
=== Pondus magazine ===
The Pondus magazine has been a monthly publication since 2000. The line-up of past and current guest strips are:

- Rutetid, also by Øverli, in the one-panel format.
- The Duplex by Glenn McCoy
- Eon by Lars Lauvik
- Holger og Hagbart by Arne Bye
- The Flying McCoys by Glenn and Gary McCoy
- M by Mads Eriksen
- MonoMania by Thomas S. Hansen
- Piray by Karine Haaland
- Prim by Bodil Revhaug
- RedakTom by Tom Ostad
- Rocky by Martin Kellerman

=== Pondus albums ===
There have so far been 9 digest albums, all but the seventh given football-related titles. English translations appended:

- 1. Første omgang (2001, Schibsted, ISBN 82-509-4551-4) First Half
- 2. Andre omgang (2002, Schibsted, ISBN 82-509-4788-6) Second Half
- 3. Hat trick (2003, Schibsted, ISBN 82-509-4955-2) In reference to football's hat-trick, a 3-goal accomplishment.
- 4. Flat firer (2004, Schibsted, ISBN 82-509-5204-9) Flat Four. A reference to the "back four" in soccer, which normally involves four defenders, flat in reference to the defence forming a straight line, to execute an offside trap. The cover displays Pondus playing football, having just "flattened" the opponent player #4.
- 5. Fem rette (2005, Schibsted, ISBN 82-509-5409-2) Five Correct. A reference to the Norwegian football pools betting on 12 matches, with prizes awarded for 10, 11, or 12 successful predictions. 5 is a very poor result.
- 6. 0-6 (2006, Schibsted, ISBN 82-509-5592-7) In reference to a very poor result for the home team in a football match. In Norwegian it can also mean no sex, or "Zero sex". The cover displays Jokke, the goalkeeper, fumbling the ball to concede a goal, as the foot of an opponent player is bound for Jokke's crotch. In the background, Jokke's girlfriend looks horrified.
- 7. Sju lange og sju breie (2007, Egmont, ISBN 978-82-429-3132-0) Seven Long and Seven Wide, an old Scandinavian expression signifying time which feels like an eternity, and referring to Pondus' old boys football squad of 14 odd-looking men posing on the cover.
- 8. 8. Divisjon (2008, Egmont, ISBN 978-82-429-3697-4) 8. Division, the lowest league level in Norwegian football.
- 9. Nummer 9 (2009, Egmont, ISBN 978-82-429-4059-9) Number 9, referring to Pondus' shirt number, a shirt usually held by top notch strikers.
- 10. Ti tette og en badehette (2010, Egmont, 978-82-429-4198-5)

== Sources ==
- Pondus dossier Avistegnernes hus (in Norwegian)

Footnotes
