= Pyton =

Norwegian comic

- Cover of Pyton № 5, 1990, with several of the magazine's main characters being targeted.
- Format: Limited series
- Genre: Humor/comedy
- Publication date: 1986 – 1996

Creative team
- Artists: Bjørn Ousland; Arnold Milten; Frode Øverli
- Editor: Dag Kolstad

Pyton was a Norwegian comic book series which was produced by the company Gevion, and afterwards Bladkompaniet, between the years 1986 until 1996. An anthology magazine with no major main character, its style of humor focused mostly on satiric and toilet humour, including sexual, toilet, and farting jokes. Most of Pyton's material was produced by the magazine's own staff, but a handful of foreign comics also appeared in the magazine, including Gary Larson's The Far Side, and the German comic Werner.

The name is Norwegian for python, a term which in Scandinavia also has gained a slang adjective meaning of "disgusting" or "sick". The magazine also adopted a python snake as mascot (after discarding their original polar bear), who occasionally featured in his own comics.

The magazine reached its peak around 1990 when it sold around 35,000 copies per month.

The Essential Guide to World Comics by Tim Pilcher and Brad Brooks says that the anthology and its sister series MegaPyton had "short-lived but important MAD-style humour anthologies with an underground comix edge."

The magazine's editor was Dag Kolstad, who prior had been the editor for Norsk MAD, the Norwegian edition of MAD Magazine. Kolstad was also a writer for many of the series (under the pen name Dick Kolby), and was also featured in the actual series as the sadistic and overweight character Redaktøren (The Editor). Another prominent writer was Rolf Håndstad (pen name: Rhesus Minus, Balle Brock).

Some of Pyton's most prominent artists were Tommy Sydsæter, Bjørn Ousland, Arild Midthun (pen name: Arnold Milten), Kristian B. Walters and Frode Øverli who a few years later created the successful and popular comic strip Pondus. Martin Kellerman, who later went on to create Rocky, also made a few contributions to Pyton in the mid-1990s.

In 2009, the old magazine had gained a large nostalgic appeal, and it was decided to launch the massive collector box MegaPyton (not to be confused with the Swedish magazine Mega-Pyton, see below), featuring classics from the magazine collected in hardcover books.

In 2026, a book about the magazine's history Historien om Pyton, written by Øyvind Holen, was released by the publisher Strand Forlag in Norway.

== Recurring features ==
The monthly publication had no constant features, nevertheless several new features were created almost monthly. Some of the most popular features were:

- Dølle Døck, created by Dick Kolby and Tommy Sydsæter
- Rhesus Minus og Tommy Tusj, created by Rolf Håndstad and Tommy Sydsæter
- Pervo-Kris, created by Kristian B.Walters
- Hellitern og Halvlitern, created by Bjørn Ousland
- Lucky Duck, created by Bjørn Ousland
- Bottolf Nerd, created by Arnold Milten
- Deep Shit Junkies, created by Frode Øverli
- Wunder-Bjarne, created by Tom Ostad
- Førerhunden Adolf, created by Erik Nordgård
- Skateboard-Fantomet, created by Erik Nordgård
- Bøffert Fusk, created by Mikael Grahn

== Foreign editions ==
In 1990, a foreign edition was launched in Sweden, also named Pyton. Apart from publishing older Norwegian material, this spinoff edition also showcased Swedish artists such as Joakim Lindengren, Mikael Grahn and Alf Woxnerud etc. This soon led to much international collaboration between the two editions with many cartoonists, both Norwegian and Swedish, producing work published in both editions. The Swedish edition folded in 1998.

In 1992, the Swedish spinoff Mega-Pyton appeared, in the beginning it was mostly a thicker version of the original magazine, but after a while it evolved into a more alternative/underground-oriented magazine featuring artists such as Ivan Brunetti, Mike Diana and Sam Henderson, as well as local Swedish artists including David Liljemark. This edition folded in 2001.

In 1994, after the success of the Swedish launch, there was an attempt to release a Danish edition under the same name. For some reason, this edition wasn't as successful as the other Scandinavian editions, and the magazine was cancelled after only seven issues in 1995.

The longest lasting of these editions was in Finland, where the magazine was launched in 1989, titled Myrkky (Finnish for "poison" or "venom"), published by the Finnish branch of the Nordic publisher Egmont. Originally, the magazine featured mostly translated Swedish and Norwegian material, but after these editions folded, the magazine published more and more native material, as well as material imported from other sources. The most popular character in Myrkky was Pera Pervo (Pervo-Kris). This edition didn't fold until November 5, 2008, with a final summer special appearing in 2009.

Regular strips in Myrkky included Myyntimies Mynttinen, Pera Pervo (Pervo-Kris) and Firkin the Cat.

Perhaps the most famous cartoonist whose work appeared in Myrkky is the British Hunt Emerson. However, most of the strips - particularly after the other editions had folded - were drawn by Finnish cartoonists. Regular Finnish cartoonists included Santtu Liima, Armas Salakka and Samson.

== See also ==
- Viz comics
