= Karine Haaland =

Norwegian cartoonist (born 1966)

- Born: 29 August 1966 (age 60) Bergen, Norway
- Area: cartoonist
- Notable works: Våre venner menneskene Streng, men urettferdig Baller av stål, hjerte av gull
- Awards: full list

Karine Haaland (born 29 August 1966 in Bergen) is a Norwegian comic strip creator, animator and illustrator, known for the comic strip Piray.

== Biography ==
Haaland made her publishing debut in the student paper Universitas in 1995, but her breakthrough came with inclusion into the Norwegian magazine Larsons Gale Verden, featuring the cartoons of Gary Larson. Her work has since been syndicated to several magazines and newspapers, most notably Dagbladet, Dagsavisen and Bergens Tidende, although the latter has the distinction of having fired her over a censorship dispute. The books containing her work sell well in Norway and are printed in multiple editions.

For several years Haaland's strip ran under no title, and featured no named characters. Eventually, recurring characters became named, such as Louïs who started appearing in 1996, Lolito first featured in 1997, Melis in 1999, and Soto & Simson in 2003. The strip was finally given the name Piray in 2005. Following a long run as supporting strip in Larsons Gale Verden, Haaland changed publisher, and is currently featured in the monthly magazines dedicated to Bud Grace's Ernie and Frode Øverli's Pondus.

== Partial bibliography ==
- Våre venner menneskene (Our Friends the Human Beings, 1999, Schibsted, ISBN 82-509-4216-7)
- Streng, men urettferdig (Strict but Unfair, 2002, Schibsted, ISBN 82-516-1964-5)
- Hva menn vil vite om damer –og hva damer vil vite om menn (What Men Want to Know About Women -and What Women Want to Know About Men, 2004, Gyldendal, ISBN 82-05-33198-7)
- Baller av stål, hjerte av gull (Balls of Steel, Heart of Gold, 2005, Egmont, ISBN 82-429-2694-8)
- Piray -10 år med tullingene (Piray -10 Years with the Fools, 2006, Egmont, ISBN 82-429-2993-9)

== Awards ==
- 1998: Raptus Dagbladet Comic Strip Award, for Han sjøl
- 1999: Sproing Award, for Angsten eter sjelen (Angst Eats the Soul) in Våre venner menneskene
