= Sproing Award =

Norwegian comics award

The Sproing Award is awarded by Norsk Tegneserieforum (NTF), an organisation to promote interest and understanding for comics in Norway. Since 1987, the award has been presented for the Best Norwegian Strips, a comic strip or comic book by a Norwegian, and Best Translated Strips, an international comic strip/comic book translated into Norwegian. Since 2003, there has also been awarded a Sproing for Best Comics Debut.

At NTF's annual meeting, a jury is selected which reads all publications of the year and choose five nominees for the national and international classes, and three nominees for the debut class. Initially, voting was exclusive to NTF members, but has been opened to the public in the 2000s.

== Best translated comics ==
- 1987: Carl Barks, for Donald Duck: I det gamle Persia (Egmont Serieforlaget)
- 1988: Bill Watterson, for Tommy & Tigern #1 (Calvin & Hobbes) (Semic)
- 1989: Brian Bolland and Alan Moore, for Det glade vanvidd (Semic)
- 1990: Francois Bourgeon, for Skumringens venner (Les compagnons de crépuscule) (Cappelen)
- 1991: Don Rosa, for Donald Duck: Tilbake til Xanadu (Egmont Serieforlaget)
- 1992: Peter Madsen and others, for Valhall: Frøyas smykke (Semic)
- 1993: Art Spiegelman, for Maus (Cappelen)
- 1994: Daniel Clowes, for "Blå Italienske Greier" i Fidus (No Comprendo Press)
- 1995: Gary Larson, for "Madame Qs forbannelse" i Larsons gale verden (Bladkompaniet)
- 1996: Neil Gaiman and others, for Sandman: Lyden av vingeslag (Bladkompaniet)
- 1997: Carl Barks, for "Marco Polos skatt" i Donald Duck & Co nr. 27 (Egmont)
- 1998: Jeff Smith, for Bone: Flukten fra Boneville (Bladkompaniet)
- 1999: Quino, for 1 side i Larsons gale verden nr. 4 (Bladkompaniet)
- 2000:
  - Jean Giraud, for Blueberry: Geronimo (Egmont Serieforlaget)
  - Jeff Smith, for Bone: Det store kuveddeløpet (Bladkompaniet)
- 2001: Martin Kellerman, for Rocky-sekvenser i Pondus nr. 1-4 (Bladkompaniet)
- 2002: Daniel Clowes, for Ghost World (No Comprendo Press)
- 2003: Peter Madsen, for Menneskesønnen (Det norske bibelselskap)
- 2004: Alan Moore and Kevin O'Neill, for League of Extraordinary Gentlemen, del 2 (Schibsted Forlagene)
- 2005: Marjane Satrapi, for Persepolis (No Comprendo Press)
- 2006: Joann Sfar, for Rabbinerens Katt (Le chat du rabbin) (Egmont Serieforlaget)
- 2008: David B., for Epileptisk (l'Ascension du Haut Mal) (No Comprendo Press)

== Best Norwegian comics ==
- 1987: Tor Bomann-Larsen, for Drama i Bayern (Cappelen)
- 1988:
  - Arild Midthun and Terje Nordberg, for Troll: Sølvskatten (Bladkompaniet),
  - Christopher Nielsen, for En fettsugers bekjennelser (Semic)
- 1989: Christopher Nielsen, for UR i Rummpfftillfftooo? nr. 3 (self published)
- 1990: Bjørn Ousland and Eirik Ildahl, for Solruns saga: Nattlys (Bladkompaniet)
- 1991: Morten Myklebust and Kåre Holt, for Kristina av Tunsberg (Mykle Illustrasjoner)
- 1992: Inka-Lill, for Ridderne av Dor 1: Hjertets knekt (Bladkompaniet)
- 1993: Steffen Kverneland, for Jonas Fjeld: De knyttede never (TEGN A/Lbum)
- 1994: Siri Dokken and Baard Enoksen, for Kongens Mann (Cappelen)
- 1995: Jason, for Lomma full av regn (TEGN A/Lbum)
- 1996: Inka-Lill, for Ridderne av Dor 4: Lovens Bokstav (Bladkompaniet)
- 1997: Tore Strand Olsen, for "Tore Hund" i Forresten nr. 4 (Jippi Forlag)
- 1998: Frode Øverli, for Pondus: Alt for Norge (Bladkompaniet)
- 1999: Karine Haaland, for "Angsten eter sjelen" i Våre venner menneskene (Bladkompaniet)
- 2000: Jason, for Mjau Mjau 10: Si meg en ting (Jippi Forlag)
- 2001: Odd Henning Skyllingstad, for Serie uten tittel i Forresten nr. 11 (Jippi Forlag)
- 2002: Ronny Haugeland, for Downs Duck i bl.a. Forresten (Jippi Forlag)
- 2003: Frode Øverli, for Pondus julespesial (Schibsted)
- 2004: Lars Fiske and Steffen Kverneland, for Olaf G (No Comprendo Press)
- 2005: Christopher Nielsen, for Uflaks (No Comprendo Press)
- 2006: Bendik von Kaltenborn, for Seks sultne menn (Dongery)
- 2007: Sigbjørn Lilleeng, for Nebelgrad Blues 3 (Jippi Forlag)
- 2008: Pushwagner, for Soft City (No Comprendo Press).
- 2009: Bendik Kaltenborn, for Serier som vil deg vel (No Comprendo Press).
- 2010: Sindre Goksøyr, for Hrmf! (Dongery Forlag).
- 2011: Børge Lund, for Lunch (Egmont Serieforlaget).
- 2012: Øyvind Holen and Mikael Noguchi, for Drabant (Cappelen Damm).
- 2013: Knut Nærum, Tormod Løkling and Arild Midthun, for Donald Duck julealbum: Skrues barndom: Kampen om jula (Egmont Serieforlaget).
- 2014: Bjarte Agdestein, Endre Skandfer and Ronald Kabícek, for Krüger & Krogh 1: Brennpunkt Oslo (Egmont Serieforlaget).
- 2015: Lars Fiske, for Automobilfabrikken Fiske (No Comprendo Press).
- 2016: Håkon Aasnes, for Smørbukk: Jula 2016 (Norsk Barneblad).
- 2017: Øyvind Sagåsen, for Radio Gaga (in Pondus).
- 2018: Lise Myhre, for Nemi.
- 2019: Jens K. Styve, for Dunce.
- 2020: Thore Hansen, for Euffen og Solan.
- 2021: Therese G. Eide, for Intet nytt fra hjemmefronten.
- 2022: Torbjørn Lien, for Kollektivet.
- 2023: Nils Axle Kanten, for Hjalmar.

== Best debut ==
- 2003: Siri Pettersen, for Anti-Klimaks (bl.a. Schibsted Forlagene)
- 2004: Bjørn Sortland and Øyvind Torseter, for On the road again, again (No Comprendo Press)
- 2005: Astrid Hansen, for Serier uten tittel (in Nemi) (Egmont Serieforlaget)
- 2006: Lene Ask, for Hitler, Jesus og farfar (Jippi Forlag)
- 2008: Gunnar Wærness, for Bli verden (Oktober forlag)

== Sources ==
- NTF Sproing Award info (in Norwegian)

Footnotes
