= Leif Halse =

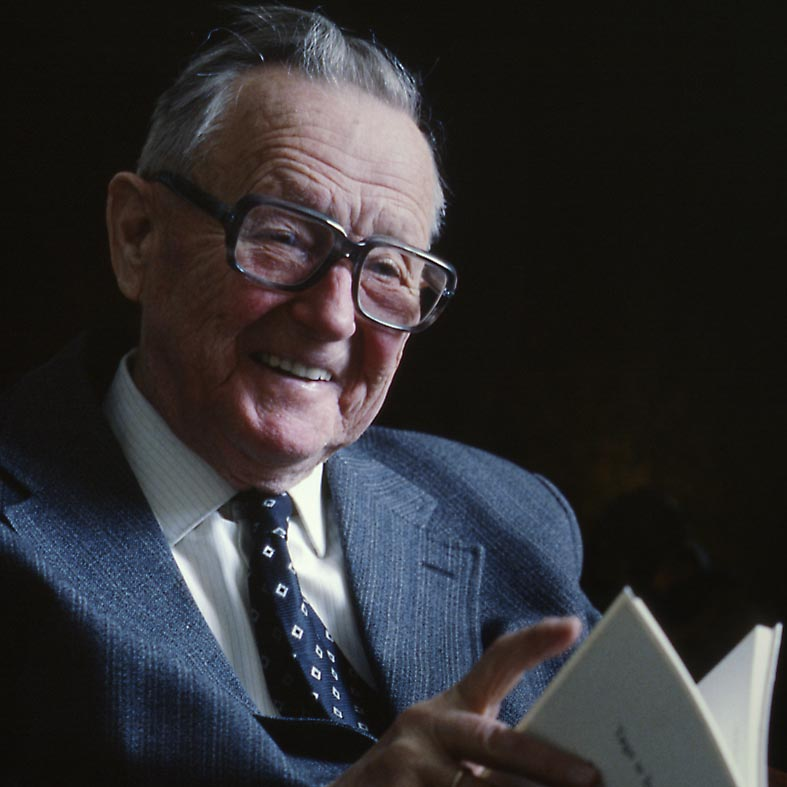
- Leif Halse in 1978
- Born: 7 July 1896; Halsa Municipality, Norway
- Died: 8 February 1984 (aged 87); Levanger Municipality
- Occupations: Teacher; Children's writer Comics writer Historian
- Notable work: Vangsgutane

Leif Torvald Halse (7 July 1896 – 8 February 1984) was a Norwegian teacher, novelist, short story writer, children's writer, comics writer and local historian, particularly known for the comics series Vangsgutane.

== Biography ==
He was born in Halsa Municipality and grew up in Todal in Surnadal Municipality. He was employed at Levanger Teacher School ( Levanger lærerhøgskole) from 1914–17, later working at Hommelvik, where he was a teacher and local historian.

Halse made his literary debut in 1920 with the story collection UIv. He later wrote novels, children's books and local history books. He edited the anthologies Trønderkveld (1943) and I trønder-lag (1944). The comics series Vangsgutane was started in 1940, initiated by the editor of the weekly magazine Nynorsk Vekeblad, Hans Aarnes. Halse wrote the text for the series, which was illustrated by Jens R. Nilssen from 1941 to 1957, and eventually by other illustrators. Halse issued a collection of Vangsgutane almost every year from 1941 to 1982 (except in 1944, 1946 and 1963).

Halse was awarded the King's Medal of Merit in gold (Kongens fortjenstmedalje). A statue of "Vangsgutane", sculptured by Annasif Døhlen and with a relief of Hals, was unveiled in Todal in 1997.
