= Eirik Ildahl =

Norwegian comics writer

- Born: 19 June 1957 (age 68); Hamar, Norway
- Occupations: Comics writer, scriptwriter, playwright and novelist
- Awards: Sproing Award (1990)

Eirik Ildahl (born 19 June 1957) is a Norwegian comics writer, scriptwriter, playwright and novelist. He was born in Hamar.

Among his comics series is Sirkus from 1980 onwards (with co-writer Terje Nordberg and illustrator Arild Midthun), and the trilogy Solruns saga with illustrator Bjørn Ousland. He was awarded the Sproing Award in 1990, for the album Solruns saga 2: Nattlys, along with Bjørn Ousland.

He was scriptwriter for the television series Hotel Cæsar, and for the films Blackout from 1986, and Hodet over vannet (Head Above Water) from 1993, starring Cameron Diaz.
