= Characters in Pondus =

Norwegian comic strip characters

The cartoon strip Pondus by Frode Øverli has a number of major and minor recurring characters.

== Pondus' family ==
=== Pondus ===
Pondus (real name Patrick) is a living football encyclopedia in his mid thirties (once quoted to be 35), and an avid fan of Liverpool F.C. and AC/DC (he claims his favorite song is Shoot to thrill). He is married to Beate, and father to their two children, Påsan and Sneipen. He actively plays football at "old-boys" level, giving him opportunity to play hard and occasionally perform like the player he dreams he is. He has both seriously injured others, and been seriously injured himself. When it comes to knowledge about British football, he has nearly idiot savant expertise, about teams and players down to the obscure Lower Leagues.

He worked for several years as a bus driver, but did at one point get too much exposure to "the freaks that use public transportation", and as pub-owner Turid-Laila was leaving for a transglobal sailing trip, Pondus quit his old job and bought her pub. At this establishment, he and his best friend Jokke were already spending a great deal of time.

=== Beate ===
Beate (English: Linda) is Pondus' reasonably wise wife and mother of Påsan and Sneipen. She works as a nurse at the local hospital. Some of the characters at the hospital are characters from a previous comic that Øverli did, Riskhospitalet (The Risk Hospital, a pun on Rikshospitalet, National Hospital).

She has been with Pondus since they were teenagers, but is a far more conventionally normal person than he is. She does not share his love for football, but much prefers to watch soap operas on TV. The only thing she will never forgive about their wedding day, is the fact that he got married in his soccer shoes (and tuxedo). Her taste in music is offensive to Pondus, as she likes to listen to Michael Bolton, Modern Talking, Ricky Martin etc.

Her best friend is Selma.

=== Kevin ===
Kevin (English: Junior) usually called Påsan, is the pubescent son of the Pondus household. He has, since the start of the series, grown from being a typical child in elementary school, to a puberty-stricken teenager. He has inherited his father's love for football and rock music. He plays football for a local club in a manner that reflects his father's style of playing.

He also plays guitar with a group of friends in a band named Fotsopp (English: Athlete's foot), a twist on the name of the Norwegian band Röyksopp. His best friend is Kjakan. Recently it has been revealed that Påsan has stopped playing guitar and is now more a hip-hop fan.

Påsan is not the smartest boy in the class, but if it was a class where you needed to make up histories (as where Stalin came from and went) he would get straight A's.

=== Frida ===
Frida was over several years called Sneipen (English: Rugrat), but her proper name was revealed in the May issue of 2007. She is a girl toddler who has yet to develop into a speaking character, although her thoughts are apparent to the reader. Her vocabulary is limited to very few words, one of which is Dommerjævel (English: bastard referee), which does not please her mother but gives her father some satisfaction.

Frida attends kindergarten (Soppen barnehage - The Mushroom Kindergarten) and has during the strip's run grown to look a bit older. She is sometimes shown praying to God before going to bed, for instance asking God to make Liverpool FC play better, as that would make her father happy. She is also capable of impressive drawings for her age, but often she thinks higher of her works than what they truly are. Frida also has a very close and friendly relationship with the various night-time monsters in her closet and under her bed.

=== Bjarne ===
Bjarne is the Pondus household family dog, of unnamed breed, and most likely a mutt blend of several indeterminable races, but at the very least "thought to be dog breeds" or of extraterrestrial origins (as he has no navel/belly button). At a veterinarian checkup it was revealed that he had 26 more teeth than normal dogs, of which all seemed to have been thrown into his mouth from a great distance. Many of Bjarne's appearances revolve around the tasks of bathing and toenail-clipping, both of which are events Bjarne dreads, and dangerous to the person attempting the task.

All appearances of this dog confirm the idea that Bjarne is exceptionally unintelligent. There is only one known exception, in a comic strip where Pondus wonders about what Bjarne is thinking. At the end of the strip, you see Bjarne thinking: "E=mc^{2}". In a later strip, he is seen walking right into a tree during a stroll. When Pondus and Beate were getting a dog, they actually got 200 NOK (about US$30), to take Bjarne home. Bjarne is also "called" Rex by Påsan/Kevin, but that is only to get the hang of the girls.

One of Kevin`s pastimes is experimenting with Bjarne and various items, once sending him from a cliff in a parachute. More recently, Bjarne was attached to a motorized hang-glider, because Kevin wanted to get away from the chore of follow the dog on his regular rounds. The contraption worked by remote control, with a limited range. Kevin and Pondus watched helplessly as the dog drifted away overseas, being spotted at a Norwegian oil rig, and then over Shetland, before turning up in Washington, D.C., where he collided with president Barack Obama during his annual Christmas speech. The dog was returned by CIA, presumed to be a weird act of terrorism. The story was published as a Christmas special, by the way pointing out that Pondus and his family lives in Bergen, or at least in the western parts of Norway.

== Jokke's family ==
=== Jokke ===
Jokke (real name Joachim Jacobsen, English: Raymond) used to be a notorious flirt with the very ugliest women to be found, due to some internal code that no opportunity should ever be left unattempted. Very often this would lead him to get severely beaten up. He is of the same age as Pondus, and sees himself as his equal in every way, not least in terms of strength which they occasionally measure, always ending in a tie. Jokke is also Pondus' equal in terms of football fanhood, but his less fortunate destiny is supporting Leeds United, a club doomed to poor results of recent years. He also plays Old Boys football with Pondus, as goalkeeper, but he is not very good. His favourite band is Kiss which also is in conflict to Pondus' AC/DC.

Until recently, Jokke had never done an honest day's work and was very proud of this. For a while he lived at home with his mother Else and his stepfather Günther, but moved out when their sexual escapades became too much to bear, to share an apartment with Turid-Laila. Recent events have however improved Jokke's life drastically. He reunited with his long-lost, ex-criminal father and opened a vintage record store with him, and he met Camilla who is several leagues above the sort of girls pursued in the past. Jokke and Camilla then moved in together, and had a baby in 2006. But in 2008 Camilla fell in love with chess-fanatic Tor-Ivar and left Jokke to live with him, making Jokke single again. Eventually, the couple got back together, after a period on parole.

=== Camilla ===
Camilla is Jokke's girlfriend, and the mother of their child. An entirely normal and healthy woman that works as a teacher, and plays football athletically, her selection of Jokke as a partner is her only freak factor. Jokke and Camilla met during a football match in which Pondus' and Jokke's team faced off against Camilla's team, Middlesbjørg. Camilla is an avid supporter of Manchester United (and hence a historic enemy of the less fortunate Leeds) which leads to some conflict. Recently it was discovered that Camilla had an affair with one of her colleagues, chess fanatic Tor-Ivar, something that causes Jokke and Camilla to break up. It becomes clear that they get joint custody of their son Gordon, and Jokke moves out of their apartment and into a new one above his father's record store. Camilla recently left Tor-Ivar because of his fanatical devotion to chess, something she at first thought to be cute, but later found irritating to the point of murderous rage. She asked Jokke if there was any chance for getting back together, but Jokke would not take the chance of getting that hurt again, making them just friends. Eventually Jokke and Camilla moved together again, after Camillas numerous attempts, and after Jokke realized that he would only meet severely ugly women. Their reunion is delayed one day because Camilla has to view the TV series "Greys Anatomy", which Jokke cannot bear watching.

=== Gordon ===
Gordon was over a period simply known as "Jokke's unnamed baby son". After suggestions such as "Jokke den andre" (English: Jokke the second) it was decided upon Gordon, a compromise between Jokke and Camilla, in honour of Gordon Strachan who played for both Manchester United and Leeds. The parents are in an eternal quarrel over the football teams on his behalf, but there is a hint that Gordon himself is going for Queens Park Rangers because of their colours.

=== Else ===
Else (English: Elsa) is Jokke's mother and married to Günther. Together they share some unusual sexual interests, including German porn, bondage and costumes. While Günther fantasizes about Dolly Parton, Else dreams of Derrick.

Else also runs a massage parlor out of her own home, and sometimes causes serious injury to her clients. Inexplicably, she is frequently mistaken for a prostitute. She also has an eternal relationship with her bathroom scale, and as a quite overweight woman, these have a tendency to break. Sometimes, all she has to do is cast a shadow.

She has started taking driving lessons, and revealed herself as an exceedingly poor driving student, and a hazard in traffic. The strips featuring these events indicate she will never improve. In a 2006 strip, she was shown taking the drivers test for the 250th time, and her driving instructor has told her that her lessons alone will fund the summer home he's building in Spain.

=== Günther ===
Günther, Jokke's bald, German midget stepfather. Most of his time is spent at home with his wife, sitting in an easy chair while wearing a fez and silk pajamas, sipping a brandy, and making sure he does not insult his wife's weight. If he does, he is thrown into the bathroom sink, in which he snugly fits. His father was a fighter pilot during the Second World War and was shot down and killed over Norway. He was born not long after his father's death. He is an occasional transvestite.

Günther also has a secret identity - Güntherman. As Güntherman, Günther sets out to fight crime. His attempts at stopping crime are usually unsuccessful, he once actually offered some robbers help to carry the famous paintings The Scream and Madonna into a van, although he has recently been inducted, after a painful initiation process, into a brotherhood of dubious superheroes.

=== Jacobsen ===
Jacobsen, Jokke's father, used to be a bank robber and jailbird during Jokke's youth, and has therefore been long-time absent. This suddenly changed when Jokke decided to contact his father, which eventually shed some light on the reasons behind Jokke's notorious taste in women and repertoire of one-liners.

Together they have opened up an Antiques&Vinyl shop, consisting mostly of items acquired by Jokke's father during his long life of crime, sold for irrationally high prices due to fake statements and facts, such as a cheap little cabinet bought at IKEA a few years back was sold as antique. The reunion of the two have apparently improved their lives a great deal.

== Other characters ==
=== Turid-Laila ===
Turid-Laila (English: Tammy-Sue) is a desirable blonde who works as a bartender at the local pub, which Pondus and Jokke have frequented since the beginning of the strip. Her manner of dealing with slobbering drunks and gawking creeps is quite impressive. She is also a source of calculated punchlines, affirming that she is no dumb blonde.

Jokke was for a while roommates with Turid-Laila, and several times sabotaged her romantic life, until he got together with Camilla and moved in with her.

Turid-Laila recently acquired a girlfriend named Mai-Linn, whom she met on Ibiza during the summer. She stated that this relationship probably was "the real thing", leading to the decision to go on a transglobal sailing journey with her, and selling her pub to Pondus. The love did not last very long, however, and she returned. She again works at the pub, but now with Pondus as her boss.

=== Kjakan ===
Kjakan (real name Kjell-Kristian, also called KK) is Påsan's best friend. Has a problem with acne outbreaks and obesity, and is far from the most popular boy in school. Many times he has been the victim of severe intimidation by girls from the class. Kjakan is the drummer in Påsan's band Fotsopp.

=== Harold & Selma ===
Harold and Selma are longtime friends of Beate, and depicted as a dull old couple. Selma makes most decisions in their house, and Harold is lucky if he's allowed to go outside. Harold has an obsession with his aquarium fish and golf, and is also shown as a whisky-drinker who buys good quality brands, but blends with cola (prompting Pondus to steal the bottle from him, reasoning that the only decent action is to adopt it). Selma does not approve of her husband's drinking, though, and it is also implied that Harold has a very low tolerance. On a rare night out with Pondus and Jokke (he comments that the last time he set foot in a bar, Ronald Reagan was U.S. president) he becomes intoxicated after one sip of whisky.

=== Hugo & Ivar ===
Hugo and Ivar are two of Pondus' (now former) colleagues from public transportation. Both are eternal bachelors who share the strange obsession of collecting bottle-caps. In recent strips, the duo have replaced Jokke's former role as pathetic pursuers of the world's ugliest women. They usually make a classical comedy duo (the thin one and the fat one). In this case, Hugo makes a sensible foil to Ivar´s antics. Ivar developed a unibrow in recent years. Of the two, it is Ivar who ends up ostensibly drunk and gets the occasional beating (in those stories he acts alone).

=== Ponny-Petra ===
Ponny-Petra is perhaps the most notorious and long-lasting of Jokke's acquaintances. She has a strong fascination with country music, (especially Bjøro Håland and Hank Williams), and horses, hence her name. She used to terrorize Jokke, believing herself to be his girlfriend, but fell into a coma after listening to Jokke's music (which he claimed was banned in 108 countries with the volume set to 'hairdryer'). She is an extremely strong woman, as demonstrated when she punches Jokke so hard, a space shuttle spots his hat and some of his teeth in space. Occasionally, Petra has woken up from coma. At one point, she was beaten back by Turid-Laila, and was kept in "suspension" at the local hospital (nursed by Beate among others). The last time she woke up, it was revealed that the nurses were ready to give her "usual treatment" (holding a baseball bat, to keep her in coma). At this point, dr Zimmerknaben suggested therapy, and Petra was released from hospital, only to meet a piano dropped from a plane. She is expected to be perpetually in coma from this point.

=== Reidar ===
Reidar is the local car mechanic, who has virtually no sense of ethics. He would cheat his own grandmother with absolutely no remorse (the punchline of a strip), and creatively charge for opening the hood of the car and then relaxing for a while, billing it as motor-airing. For most of the time, he charges for replacement of fictional car parts, exploiting people who knows little about cars. However, a bottle of Jack Daniels might force him to tell the truth. Alternatively holding a very large wrench over his testicles while he lies down under the car works just as well.

Only on one occasion has he been unable to find any fault in a car to exploit for profit, namely a Fiat 509 belonging to Gaston Lagaffe who made a silhouetted cameo in a strip, Reidar conceding defeat while thinking, "They just don't make them like that anymore."

=== Roger ===
Roger is a creator of comics and cartoon strips of the poorest sort. Everything he produces is rejected by an editor in awe of the level of awful quality. Of unbreakable resolve, Roger is confident success will come to him eventually. His work has often led him to experiment with highly original variations of the superhero concepts, but more recently he has taken to copy already successful characters and place them together. He shows his strips to Pondus at the bar, but never takes any discouragement from his surly comments.

Examples of Roger's series are: Tanga Trond, Kaptein Kølle(Captain Cock), Roy the boy toy, Sergeant Shitface, Dirty Duck, Nicky Buttface, Karaoke Kid, Mikke Snus og Kjøttbein (Mickey Snuff & Meaty) and Kaptein Dynetrekk (Captain Bedspread).

When making fun of Pondus and Frode Øverli, other artists (most prominently Mads Eriksen) make a point in stating that Roger is the real creator of Pondus, working as a slave in the dungeon of Frode`s immense mansion. The same meta-storyline accuses Frode of being the "real" creator of Roger`s horrible cartoon characters.

=== Dr. Zimmerknaben ===
Dr. Zimmerknaben is Jokke's psychiatrist. Zimmerknaben often resorts to pills when seeing patients, no less when listening to Jokke's terrible dating experiences. In one strip, it reached the point of Zimmerknaben and Jokke's roles being reversed. After Jokke met Camilla, Zimmerknaben has been less used, but still shows up with random characters and their problems.

=== Zlatan ===
Zlatan is a pale, skinny black metal-guy that is employed at Jokke's store, having been a customer for a long while. Despite his intimidating appearance, snaggletoothed and corpse-like features, he has quite a gentle and innocent personality, singing Stevie Wonder and sleeping in Care-Bear pyjamas. He suffers from lack of vitamins, which caused him to be knocked over by a friendly pat on the shoulders.
