= Cameroon–Norway relations =

- Cameroon: Norway

Cameroon–Norway relations are the bilateral and diplomatic relations between Cameroon and Norway. While neither country has an embassy in the other—Cameroon has its closest embassy in London, whereas Norway has an embassy in Abuja—the religious and cultural relations are the most significant.

The Norwegian Missionary Society focused on Evangelical-Lutheran mission in Cameroon from 1925, and most Norwegian expatriates in Cameroon have been missionaries, mostly based in Ngaoundéré. Cameroon was the third African country with Norwegian Missionary Society presence, after South Africa and Madagascar. NMS itself states that their presence in Cameroon was "a result of a greater vision of constructing a Bible belt across Africa to contain the increasing Muslim influence from the north". Notable missionaries include Halfdan Endresen, who was decorated by newly independent Cameroon in 1960 for anti-slavery efforts, and Bjørn Bue, who was stationed in Tibati, Yoko and Ngaoundéré and partially represented the Federation of Protestant Churches and Missions of Cameroon. After returning to Norway and becoming bishop, Bue remained a key liaison in organizing cultural events involving Cameroon.

Cameroonian football became popular in Norway following the 1986 and 1990 FIFA World Cups, especially with author Jon Michelet portraying Cameroon in a positive way. A friendly match between Norway and Cameroon was arranged in October 1990, incidentally Egil Olsen's first match as Norway manager. A number of Cameroonian footballers have played in Norway in the 21st century, both men and women.

Christian voices in Norway have called for a larger degree of official Norwegian involvement in Cameroon, including increased aid and trade. Norway operates a consulate-general in both Douala and Yaoundé. Regarding human rights in Cameroon, Norway gave asylum to the journalist Philip Njaru who successfully attempted to defect in 2008. Other northbound emigrants include musician Vakoté Yama.

== See also ==
- Foreign relations of Norway
- Foreign relations of Cameroon
