= M (comic strip) =

Norwegian comic strip

- An example of M strip. The man to the left in the last three panels is Eriksen. The woman is The Madam.
- Author: Mads Eriksen
- Launch date: 2004; 22 years ago
- Genre: Surreal humour

M is a Norwegian comic strip, written by Mads Eriksen. It was published in daily newspapers such as Dagbladet, as well as in its own monthly magazine M, until December 2012. Initially published as a guest strip in Pondus magazine, it established its own dedicated magazine near the end of 2006. The strip gained a large fan base in Norway, much due to its quirky humour and numerous pop-cultural references. To this day, reprints are regularly published by Kollektivet

== Synopsis ==
A surreal, semi-autobiographical, strip, its events revolve around Mads Eriksen and The Madam, his live-in girlfriend. The Madam is always drawn with asterisks for eyes, because, Eriksen claims, it is impossible to know what is on her mind (in one strip, Eriksen states that The Madam is drawn with asterisks because "she mixes pills and alcohol"). One characteristic of the comic is the unique T-shirts the characters wear for every strip, often containing pop-culture references.

== Allegations of blasphemy ==
In November 2006, a 94-year-old woman from Selbu Municipality brought blasphemy charges against Adresseavisen, a Trondheim-based newspaper that published M, over the content of two strips. In both, Jesus Christ is seen advertising for different products, such as "Pilate's crucifixion cream for manly men". The woman who pressed charges stated that "this has nothing to do with freedom of speech. This is much worse than the Muhammad cartoons." Eriksen responded that M is a strip that pokes fun at all sorts of myths, both old and new. A few days later, Dagbladet published a strip in which Mads wins a boxing match against God on a walkover.

No further action was taken, and there has been no censorship in Norway over charges of blasphemy content since Life of Brian was banned from cinemas in 1979.

== Pop-cultural references ==
M satirising Brokeback Mountain

Pop cultural phenomena are frequently cited. Among these are:

- Alien—Eriksen gets attacked by an alien that hatched from an expired egg.
- Douglas Adams and his The Hitch Hiker's Guide to the Galaxy science fiction novel and radio show.
- Firefly—M refuses to breathe before the cancelled TV-show is brought back on the air. However, the character of Mal is incorrectly referred to as Mel in one strip.
- Gremlins—M brings a Mogwai home and wants to feed it after midnight...
- Hunter S. Thompson—Following the demise of Eriksen's coffee pot, it was blown out of a cannon, while Eriksen was wearing a T-shirt that read gonzo, mimicking Hunter S. Thompson's burial.
- Linkin Park and Fred Durst— He has, both in strips and in a national newspaper interview stated that he would rather have his pubic hairs individually removed than listen to Linkin Park. Eriksen himself looks quite similar to Fred Durst, exploited in some strips
- Linux—In one strip, Mads' brother (a computer-oracle) offers advice on how to get rid of trojans, malware, etc., always concluding with "install Linux". At one point a reader asks which Linux distribution he should use, at which point Mads' brother replies: "Gentoo for you, Ubuntu for grandma, HA-HA-HA!!!" In a current ongoing series, Mads has gotten rid of windows and tries to install Linux, but gets help from "Linux Man", A.K.A. his brother.
- LOST -There has been one reference to the TV-series LOST
- The Lord of the Rings—The Madam is especially fond of Viggo Mortensen and Aragorn.
- Marvel Comics—Galactus, antagonist of The Silver Surfer, has appeared in M on some occasions.
- The Phantom—seen intimately embracing a member of "The Singh Brotherhood", The Phantom's arch-enemies, in an M-strip.
- Poltergeist—in a story arch of strips, Eriksens dead goldfish comes to haunt his apartment, much in the fashion of Poltergeist.
- Pondus and Frode Øverli—In an ongoing "strip war" the two comics have regularly made friendly stabs at each other. It started with Eriksen doing a strip about Øverli sending text messages to all comics artists in Norway, parodying the style of John Arne Riise. Øverli retorted with an attack on M, and everything escalated from there.
- Stephen King's The Shining
- The Simpsons—There has been several The Simpsons references in the comic.
- The Silence of the Lambs—In one strip Mads dresses up like the villain Jame Gumb.
- Star Wars—Mads Eriksen is a big fan of the movie series, and the strip frequently makes references, some so specific that getting the joke is restricted to extreme fans. Only satisfied with the original trilogy, the strip's slogan is "Mye morsommere enn Jar-Jar" (a lot funnier than Jar-Jar).
- The Transformers—referenced several times
- Twin Peaks—Eriksen once uses the voice recording feature on his mobile phone to record a message to "Diane" in exactly the same fashion as Agent Cooper and his tape recorder in Twin Peaks.
- Wikipedia—A door-to-door salesman attempts to sell Mads an encyclopedia, something which causes Mads to go into a laughing fit. The Madam remarks "What are we? The Flintstones", commenting that encyclopedias in books are obsolete. Throughout the strip, Mads is wearing a T-shirt with a symbol resembling the Wikipedia logo.
- Windows Vista—Mads' brother reviews Vista, beginning by making farting sounds with his mouth, continuing on to pulling his T-shirt over his head whilst still making farting sounds.
- World of Warcraft—Mads' friend Øyvind is once seen with a shirt saying "Loot Ninja", a term used in the online-game.
- Yuggoth—Eriksen finds a homeless creature and takes it home. The creature turns out to be Cthulhu from H. P. Lovecraft's The Call of Cthulhu. At one point Eriksen says "Cthulhu Fhtagn"—"Cthulhu Dreams"—while the creature is napping in his living room.
- David Hasselhoff—David Hasselhoff save's M from a monster clown doll after M dresses in women's clothing and a blond wig and begins to scream. David Hasselhoff hears the screams from a beach and say "that's a blond girl scream!" and comes to M's rescue; fighting off the monster clown doll.
- Tom Cruise and Katie Holmes-The Madam reads the latest gossip about the (then) couple, and Eriksen pretends he wants to write it down in an imaginary book where he collect "all the important news" about the couple, only to discover that he's filled-up the "book", and therefore must hurry to the store and buy a new one.

== Sources ==
- M albums M book, M magazine Schibsted (in Norwegian)

Footnotes
