= Solveig Muren Sanden =

Norwegian illustrator and comics artist

- Born: 17 April 1918; Vrådal, Norway
- Died: 23 November 2013 (aged 95)
- Occupations: Illustrator and comics artist
- Notable work: Smørbukk
- Awards: King's Medal of Merit in silver (2001)

Solveig Muren Sanden (17 April 1918 – 23 November 2013) was a Norwegian illustrator and comics artist. She was born in Vrådal in Kviteseid Municipality. She published her first illustration in the children's magazine Norsk Barneblad in 1932. She is known for the comics series Tuss og Troll and Smørbukk. In 1973 she was the first recipient of Norwegian Ministry of Culture's comics prize. A bronze sculpture of "Smørbukk", made by Trygve Barstad, was unveiled in Vrådal in 2012.
