= Sproing =

Sproing may refer to:

- Sproing Interactive Media, an Austrian video game developer.
- The Sproing Award, a Norwegian comic award.
