= Lene Ask =

Norwegian writer and illustrator

Lene Ask (born 4 August 1974) is a Norwegian illustrator and writer of comics, graphic novels and children's books.

She was born in Stavanger and took an education in photography at the Bergen Academy of Art and Design. Her first graphic novel was Hitler, Jesus og farfar (2006), which earned her a Sproing Award as best newcomer.

Several of her graphic novels comment the relationship between Norway and the Global South. Da jeg reddet verden (2009) was built on an assignment from Norad in Tanzania; Kjære Rikard (2014) is a biographical account from Norway's mission in Madagascar, whereas O bli hos meg (2021) builds on stories from children of Norwegian missionaries in both Africa and Asia.

Her children's books include three titles in the Familien Rotle series (2008–2010), four titles in the Jo og Jenny series (2011–2014), D for tiger (2015) and the Mysteriet series 1–4 (2018–2022). These are all published on Gyldendal Norsk Forlag.
