= Arild Midthun =

Norwegian illustrator, cartoonist and comics artist

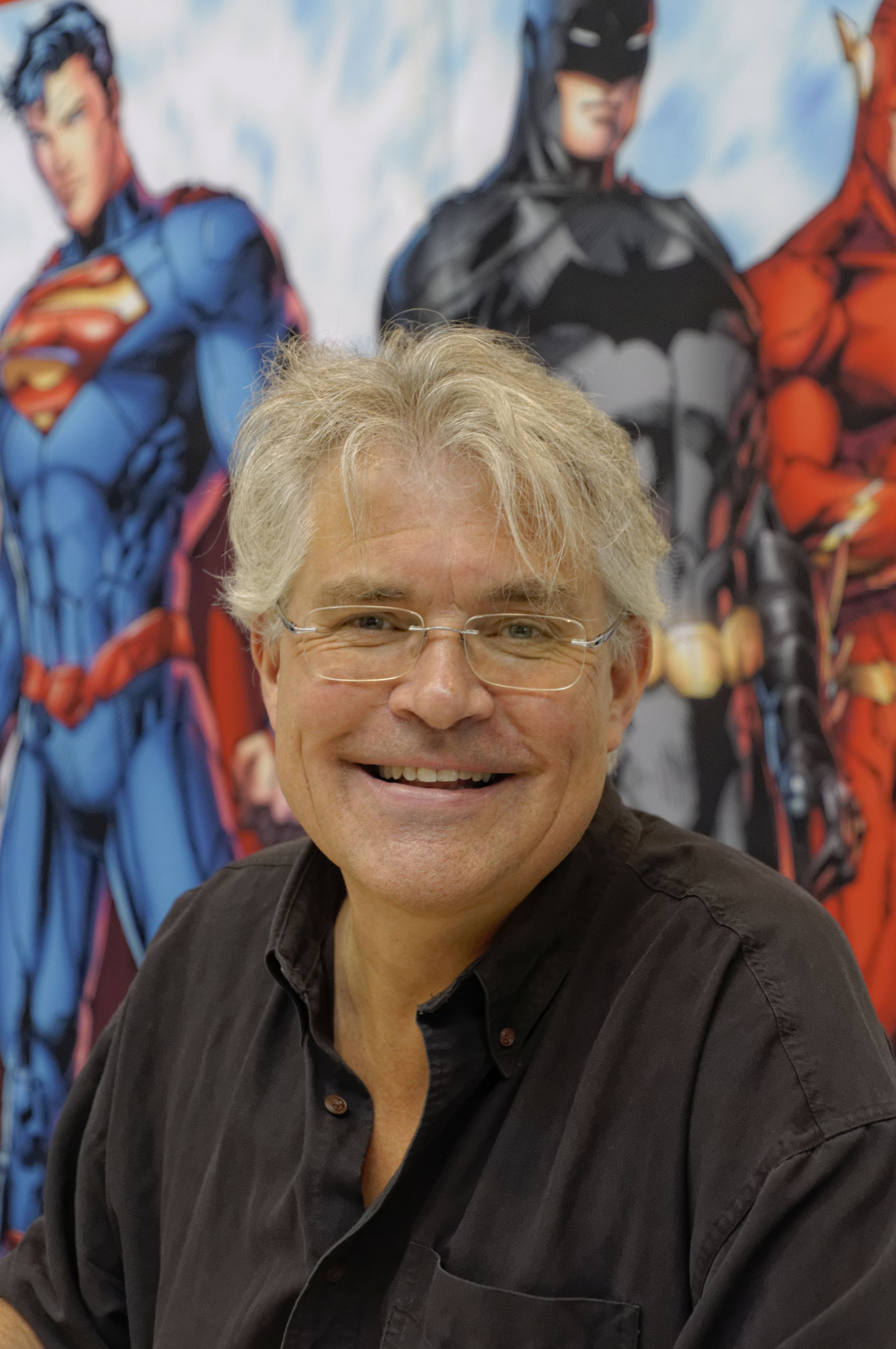
- Midthun in 2019
- Born: 6 May 1964 (age 62) Bergen, Norway
- Areas: Penciller, Artist, Inker

Arild Midthun (born 6 May 1964) is a Norwegian illustrator, cartoonist and comics artist from Bergen.

Among his early production is the comics strip Patrick & Co in the newspaper Bergens Tidende 1977, a spy series written by Tormod Løkling. His artistical breakthrough was the strip series Sirkus from 1980 to 1982, written by Terje Nordberg, Eirik Ildahl and Dag Kolstad. He was a central illustrator for the humorous magazines Norsk MAD from 1981, and Pyton from 1986 to 1995. He was awarded the Sproing Award in 1988, for the album Troll: Sølvskatten, jointly with Terje Nordberg.

From 1995 he was appointed as illustrator for the newspaper Aftenposten, and from 2004 he began drawing for the Disney comics magazine Donald Duck & Co.
