= Vangsgutane =

Norwegian comic strip

Vangsgutane (transl. The Boys from Vangen) is a Norwegian comic strip. It was started in 1940, after initiative from Hans Aarnes, editor of the magazine Nynorsk Vekeblad. The strip first appeared in Nynorsk Vekeblad in October 1940, and from 1941 as a separate Christmas album. Text writer was Leif Halse, and the first illustrator of the strip was Jens R. Nilssen, who made the drawings from 1940 to 1957. Later illustrators were Atle Steinsfjord, Bjarne Kristoffersen, Ivar Pettersen and John Thoresen. The last original strip was made in 1981, and Halse, the creator of the series, died in 1984. From 1982 there have been published annual reissues of albums from the series.

== Setting ==
The plot is set in the rural society of Todalen in Halsa Municipality in Nordmøre. Among the central characters are the young brothers Steinar and Kåre Vangen, their mother Sigrid (widow and farmer), Sterk-Ola Bakken, Breiset-gubben and Larris Skjorhagen.

A statue of Vangsgutane, sculptured by Annasif Døhlen, was raised in Todalen in 1997.
