= Jon Ewo =

Norwegian author (born 1957)

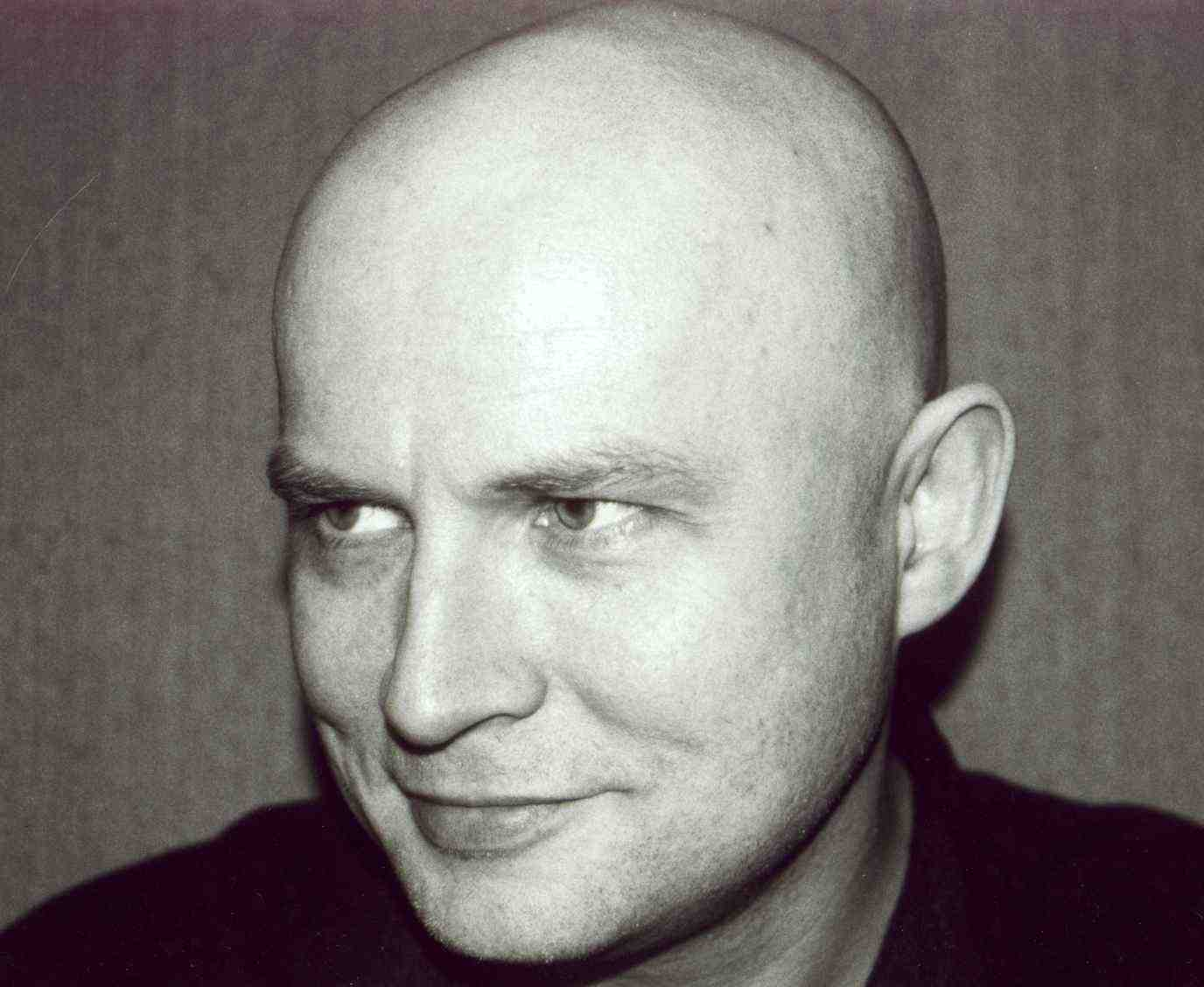
- Born: 29 June 1957 (age 68); Oslo, Norway
- Occupations: novelist, short story writer, crime fiction writer and children's writer
- Awards: Brage Prize (2007)

Jon Ewo (born 29 June 1957) is a Norwegian novelist, short story writer, crime fiction writer and children's writer. He was born in Oslo and educated as librarian. He made his literary debut in 1986 with the short story collection Det sies at oktober er en fin måned. His crime novels include Torpedo (1996), Hevn. Torpedo II (1997) and Gissel. Torpedo III (1998).

He received the Brage Prize in 2007 for the biography Fortellingen om et mulig drap (jointly with illustrator Bjørn Ousland.
