= Siri Pettersen =

Norwegian writer and fantasy author (born 1971)

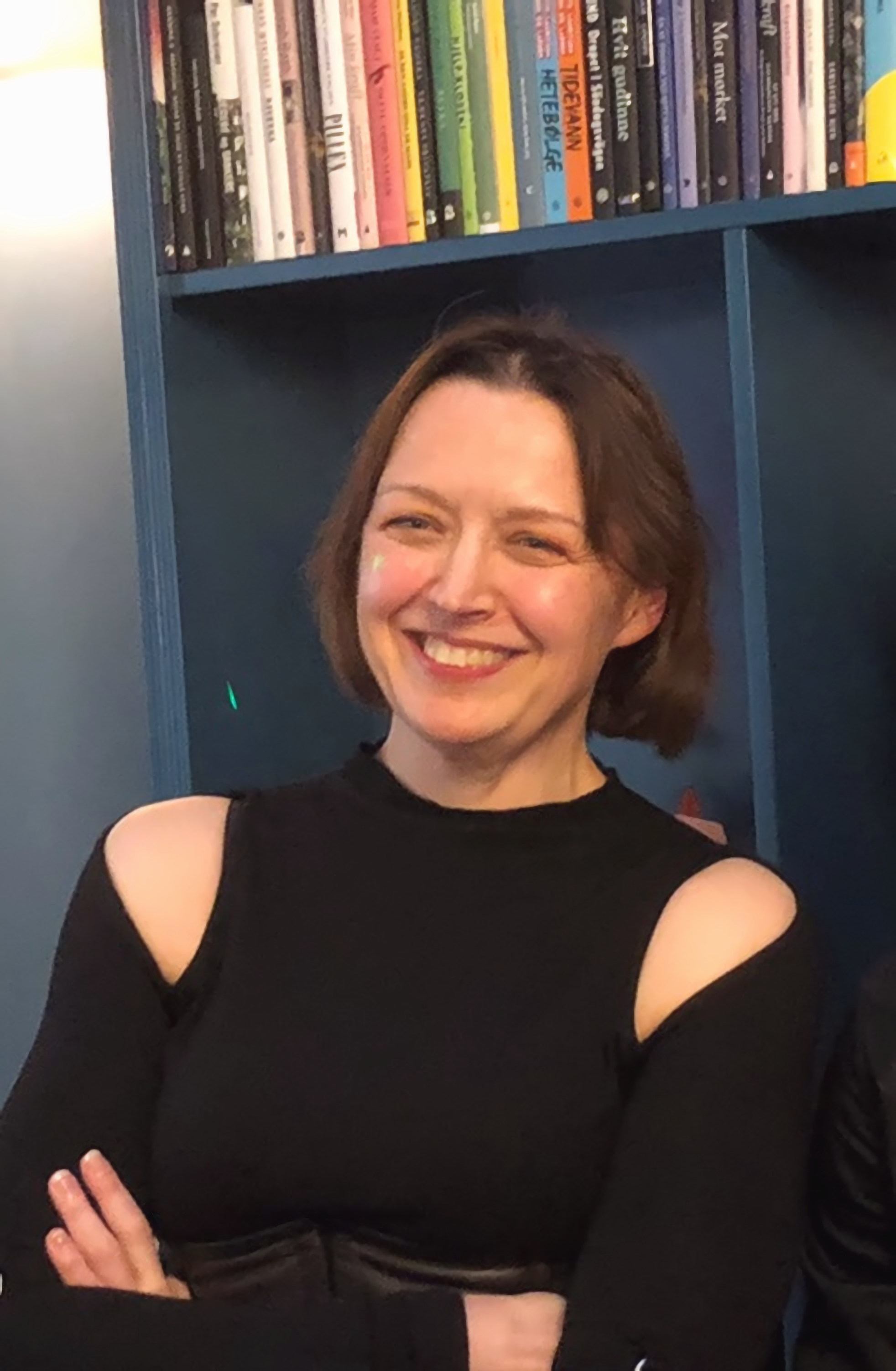
- Siri Pettersen in 2022
- Born: 28 October 1971 (age 55); Finnsnes, Norway
- Citizenship: Norwegian
- Occupation: Novelist
- Writing career
- Period: 2004–present
- Genre: Fantasy
- Notable works: The Raven Rings, Vardari
- Website: www.siripettersen.com

Siri Pettersen (born 28 October 1971 in Finnsnes) is a Norwegian writer of YA fantasy novels, whose first trilogy The Raven Rings (2013-15) have been translated into several languages, including English and German. In younger years, she was a comics creator.

== Bio ==
She grew up in Sørreisa and Trondheim, and is currently living in Oslo. She is educated as a graphic designer.

Siri Petersen's first work was the Anti-Klimaks comics series. Anti-Klimaks is about a group of youngsters who are generally against everyone and everything. They defy modern society and look forward to change. However, most of the time they quarrel among themselves, so it is hard for them to do anything about the reality they live in. As the author has put it: This is a series for those who want a different world. Anti-Klimaks was the winner of Bladkompaniets Publishing House Competition in 2002, and as a result, it appeared in the magazine Larsons Gale Verden in No 5/2003-2/2004. In 2004, the album entitled Heller mot enn for! (Rather against than for!) was published by Seriehuset Publishing House. In 2004 Siri Petersen won the Sproing Award for the best debut.

She is also the author of Kråkene (The crows). Kråkene is a silent comic.

== Books ==
- Odin’s Child (Odinsbarn), 2013; The Raven Rings #1 (Ravneringene)
- The Rot (Råta), 2014; The Raven Rings #2
- The Might (Evna), 2015; The Raven Rings #3
- Bubble (Bobla), 2017
- Iron Wolf (Jernulven), 2020; Vardari #1
- Silver Throat (Sølvstrupen), 2023; Vardari #2

The Raven Rings is a fantasy series with Norse roots. It was published by Gyldendal Norsk Forlag. It is the winner of multiple Scandinavian awards. The trilogy has been translated into Swedish, Finnish, Danish, Italian, Brazilian Portuguese, Estonian, Hebrew, English, Czech, Polish, and German. The film rights have been bought by Maipo Films.

== Awards ==
- Winner of the Sproing Award best newcomer 2004
- Winner of the Norwegian Fabelprisen (Fabel Award), 2014 for Odin’s Child
- Winner of the ARK Bookchain’s “Book of the year” Award 2015 for The Might
- Winner of the Havmannprisen (Havmann Award) 2015 for The Might
- Winner of the Sørlandets litteraturpris (Norwegian South Literary Award) 2016 for The Rot
- Norwegian listing for IBBY Honour list 2015
- Shortlisted for Norwegian Booksellers' Prize 2013, 2014, 2015, 2017, 2020
- Shortlisted for Norwegian Ministry of Culture’s Debut Award 2014
- Shortlisted for Finnish Star Fantasy Award 2016, 2022
- Shortlisted for the Book of the Year Award at the polish literary website Lubimyczytac.pl 2017, 2018, 2022
- Shortlisted for the Deutscher Phantastik Preis 2019
