= Jenny Jordahl =

Norwegian illustrator, comics creator and writer

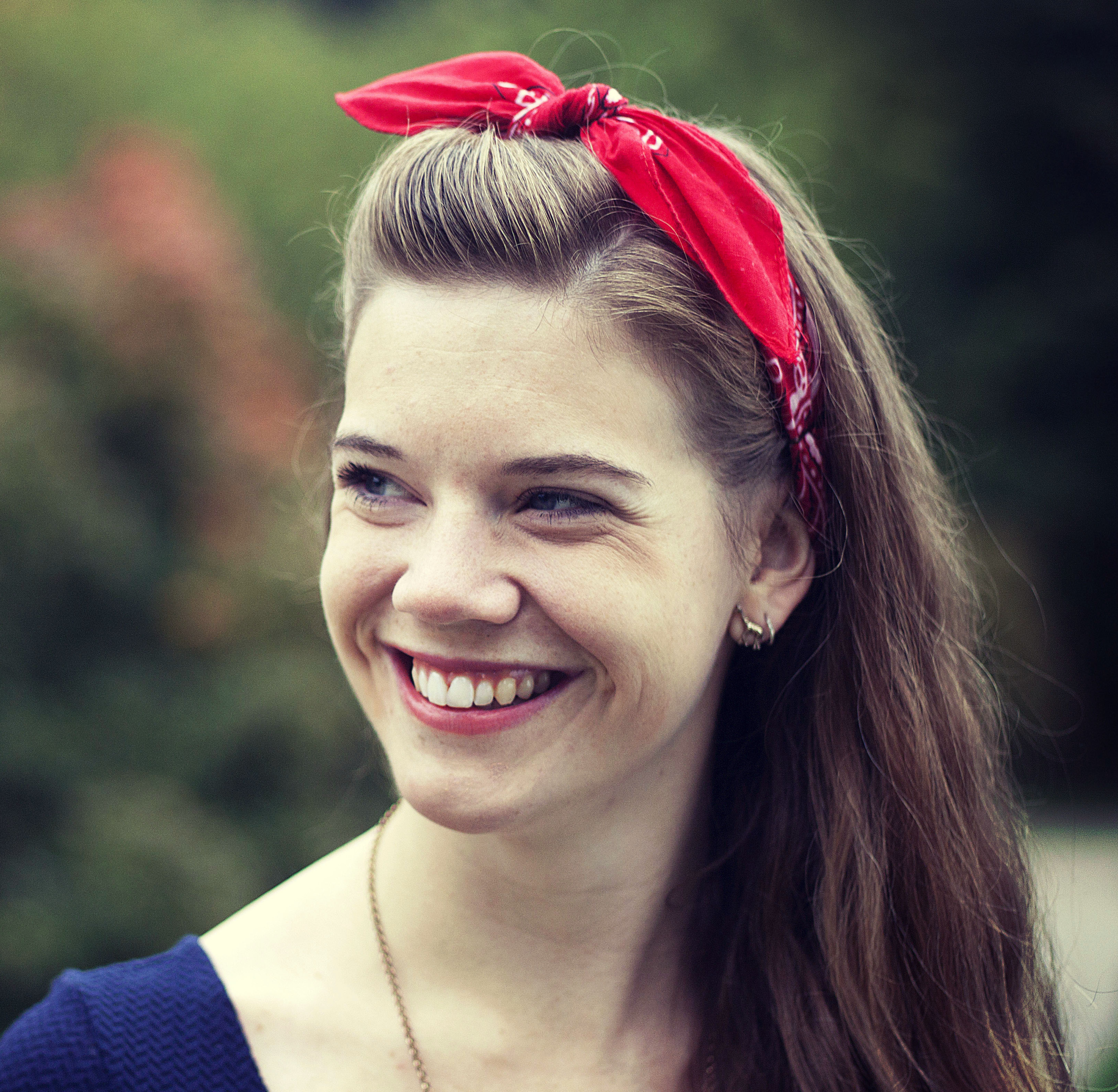
- Born: 17 July 1989 (age 37); Oslo, Norway
- Education: Oslo National Academy of the Arts
- Occupations: Illustrator comics creator writer
- Awards: Brage Prize (2020)

Jenny Jordahl (born 17 July 1989) is a Norwegian illustrator, comics creator and writer.

== Early and personal life ==
Jordahl was born in Oslo on 17 July 1989. She is educated from Kunsthøgskolen i Oslo.

== Career ==
In 2015 Jordahl published the book F-ordet. 155 grunner til å være feminist, together with Marta Breen and Madeleine Schultz, for which they received the award Fagbokprisen from the Ministry of Culture.

She further collaborated with Breen on the comics trilogy: 60 damer du skulle ha møtt. Norsk kvinnehistorie for deg som har det travelt (2016), Kvinner i kamp. 150 års kamp for frihet, likhet, søsterskap! (2018), and Patriarkatet faller. Sexismens historie og kvinners motstandskamp (2021).

Kvinner i kamp has become a success internationally, and has been translated into 28 languages as of 2024.

She is also known for the comics series Grønne greier, a collaboration with climate journalist Ole Mathismoen, published in Aftenposten junior and eventually a book.

In 2020 she issued the graphic novel Hva skjedde egentlig med deg?, about issues such as friendship, overweight and eating disorder. For this book she was awarded the Brage Prize, the Pondus Prize, and the Italian Orbil Prize.
