= Kristen Stalleland =

Norwegian writer and contributing editor (1861–1949)

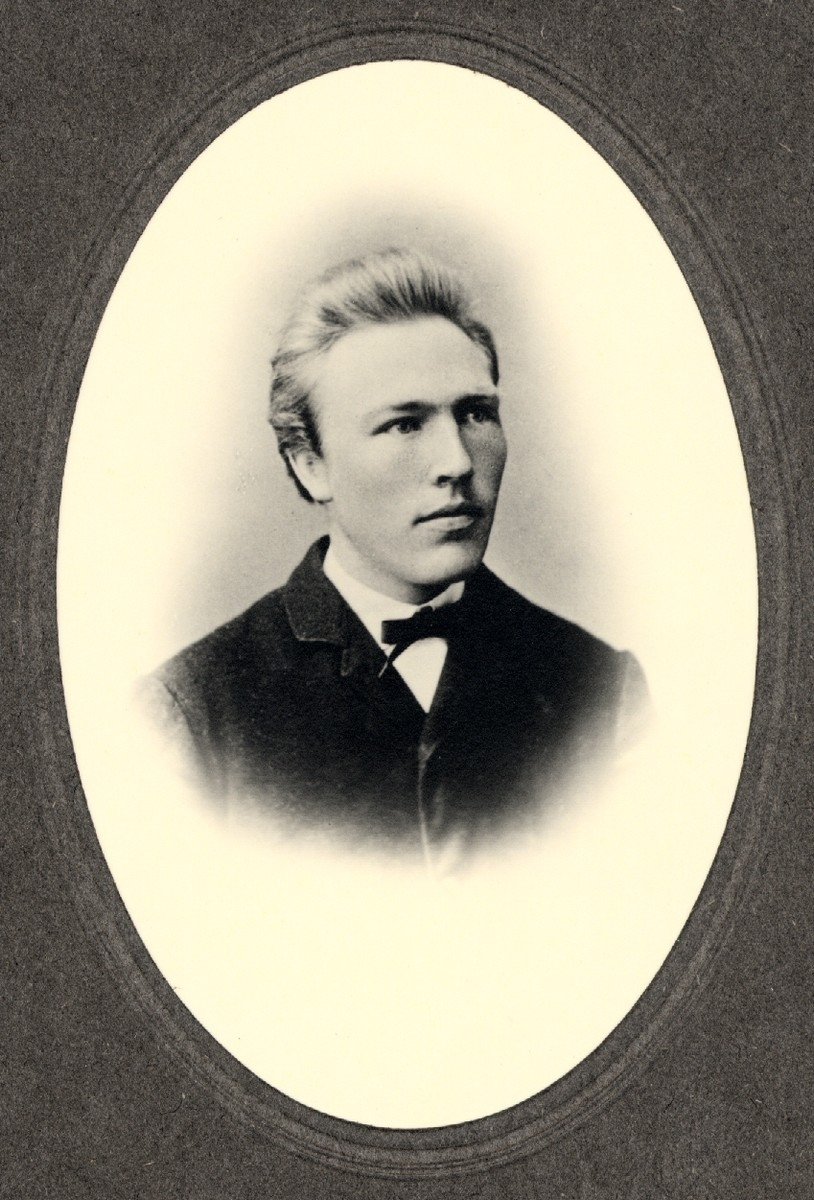
- Born: 6 February 1861; Landvik Municipality, Norway
- Died: 15 February 1949 (aged 88)
- Occupations: farmer, magazine editor, children's writer, biographer and translator

Kristen Stalleland (6 February 1861 – 15 February 1949) was a Norwegian farmer, magazine editor, children's writer, biographer and translator.

Stalleland was born in Landvik Municipality. He founded the children's magazine Norsk Barneblad in 1887, originally called Sysvorti, and edited the magazine from 1887 to 1894, and from 1898 to 1904. He wrote several stories for children, a biography of Christian Jensen Lofthuus, and translated fairy tales into Norwegian language.
