= Andreas Haavoll =

- Born: 25 September 1869; Ørsta
- Died: 6 March 1958 (aged 88)
- Occupations: Schoolteacher; Banker; Publisher; Editor

Andreas Haavoll (25 September 1869 – 6 March 1958) was a Norwegian schoolteacher, banker, publisher, newspaper editor and magazine editor.

Haavoll was born in Ørsta. He was a teacher by education, and worked as schoolteacher and banker for about twenty years. He was assigned with various newspapers, and founded the newspaper Nordmør in 1903. He was a co-founder of Det Norske Teatret in 1912, and edited the newspaper Den 17de Mai from 1913 to 1917. He published the children's magazine Norsk Barneblad from 1912, and edited the magazine from 1916 to 1954. Haavoll was honorary member of the organizations Norsk Bladmannalag, Det Norske Samlaget and Noregs Mållag. He was awarded the Melsom Prize in 1939. Haavoll also scripted the comic strip Smørbukk by Jens R. Nilssen.
