= Anna Fiske =

Swedish-born illustrator and writer

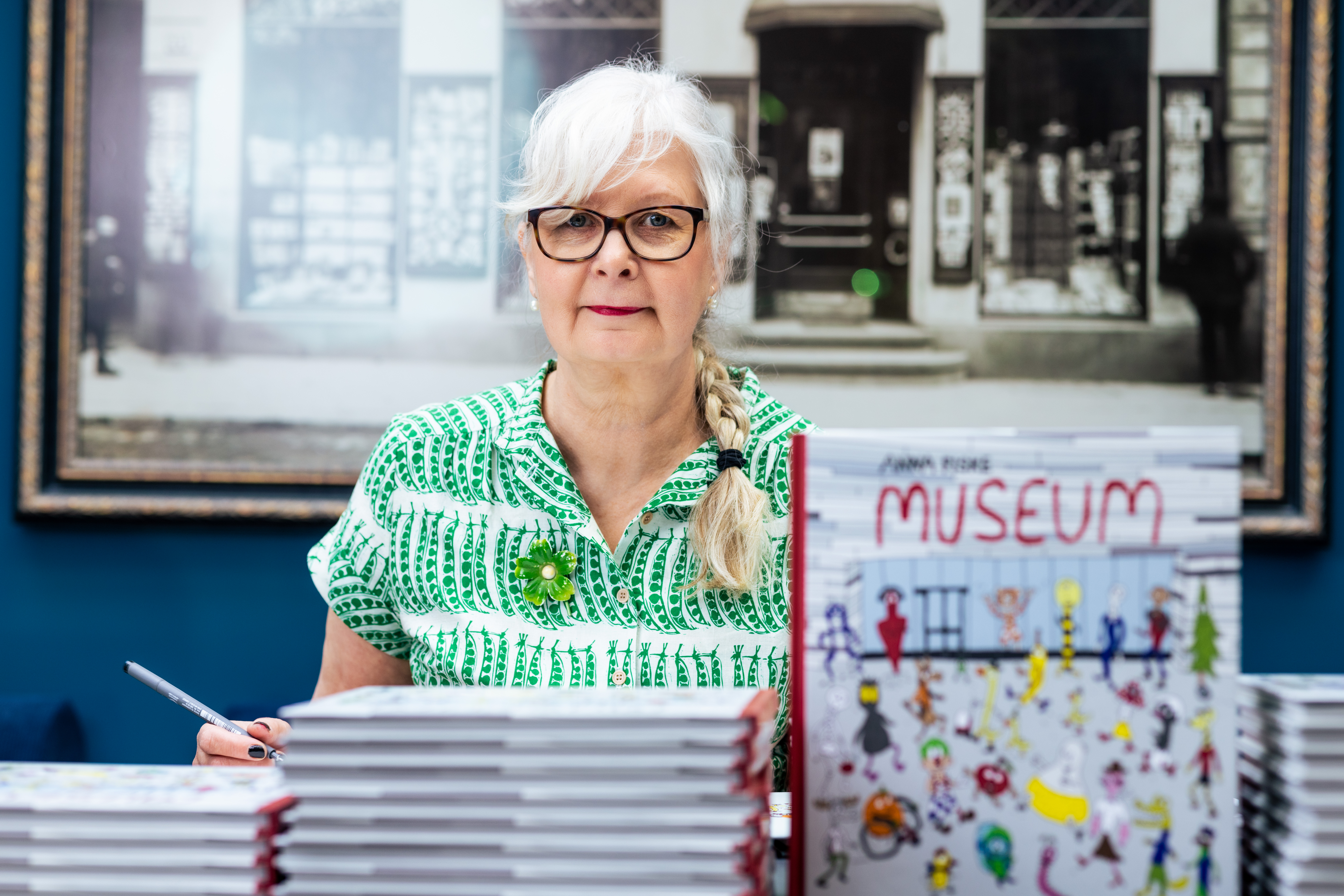
- Born: 5 September 1964 (age 62); Ängelholm, Sweden
- Education: Konstfack
- Occupations: Illustrator; Comics artist and writer Children's writer
- Spouse: Lars Fiske
- Awards: Brage Honorary Prize (2025)

Anna Karin Helena Fiske (born 5 September 1964) is a Swedish-born illustrator and writer who settled in Norway.

== Life and career ==
Fiske was born in Ängelholm, and is married to illustrator Lars Fiske. She was educated at Konstfack in Stockholm, and has resided in Norway since 1994.

Among her comics albums are Forvandlingen from 1999, Snakke med dyr from 2002, and Danse på teppet from 2004. She published the comics magazine Rabbel from 2005 to 2009. Her book Hallo Jorda was nominated for the Norwegian Critics Prize in 2007. Her picture book Små og store ting du kan lage selv was awarded two prizes in 2010, and she was awarded Bokkunstprisen in 2014.

In 2025 she was awarded the Brage Prize Honorary Prize.

== Bibliography ==
Anna Fiske has published a number of books, including:

- How Do You Make a Baby? (Gecko Press, 2020)
