= David Liljemark =

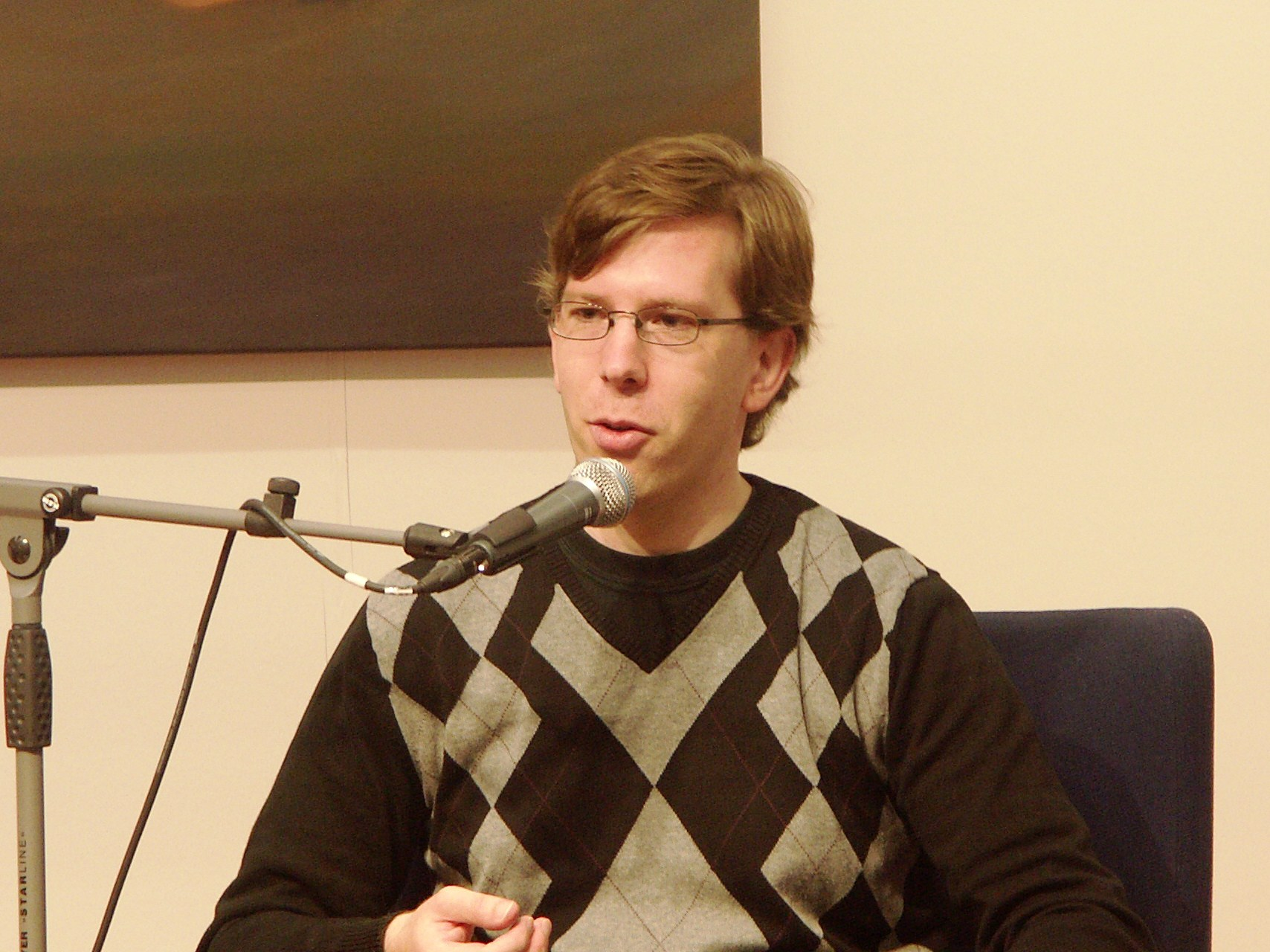
David Liljemark

David "Dayw" Liljemark (born in 1973 in Karlstad, Värmland County) is a Swedish comic creator, artist, and musician. Debuting at a young age in the Swedish fanzine/mini-comic circles, Liljemark later became one of the most productive professional cartoonists of Sweden, having been published in big newspapers such as Dagens Nyheter, magazines such as Galago and the Swedish edition of Mad Magazine, and comic books such as Mega-Pyton. He has also produced several comic albums.

David Liljemark is also a musician, active in the Swedish band The Wonder Boys.

Liljemark received the Gustaf Fröding stipend awarded by Karlstad Municipality in 2010.
