= Håkon Aasnes =

Norwegian illustrator and author

- Born: 13 February 1943 (age 83); Oslo, Norway
- Occupations: comics illustrator and writer
- Awards: Sproing Award (2016)

Håkon Aasnes (born 13 February 1943) is a Norwegian comics creator, illustrator and writer.

== Biography ==
Aasnes was born in Oslo on 13 February 1943.

He made his series debut in 1972, with the comic strip Seidel og Tobram, and became a full-time professional illustrator ten years later.

In the 1970s, he wrote and illustrated several stories for the magazine Donald Duck & Co . He drew the Disney characters licensed for Norway from 1976 to 1979, or intermittently until 1993. Aasnes was also the first Norwegian to draw for Disney, and whose own drawings, stories, and scenarios based on his own ideas received official publication by Disney. From 1983 he has written and illustrated the comic strip Smørbukk, and from 2005 also the comic strip Nr. 91 Stomperud. He has created several comics series, including Seidel og Tobram, Vi på Eiketun, Annika, Gråtass and Olsenbanden. As of January 2020, he has contributed to 440 cartoons according to the records of Mineregneserie.no, a cartoon indexing site.

== Awards ==
- 1981: Kulturdepartementets for barne- og ungdomslitteratur pris (Norwegian cultural department's prize for children and youth literature)
  - Awarded for this comic Fra skolebenk til gårdsarbeid (From school bench to yard work)
- 2016: The Sproing Award.
