= Pervo-Kris =

British-Norwegian comic strip

Pervo-Kris is a British/Norwegian ribald comic strip. It originally debuted in 1990 in the comics magazine Pyton Spesial and is written and drawn by Bristol born comics artist, Kristian B. Walters. Pervo-Kris was also featured in the Swedish spin-off comics magazine Mega Pyton after 1995 and has been a regular feature in Finnish Pyton (called Myrkky, published by Egmont) the last ten years (named ”Pera Pervo” in Finland).

Finnish readers have annually voted Pervo-Kris their number one favourite character more times than any other strips/cartoons featured.

Pervo-Kris has been printed in several comic books and albums, as well as a computer game made by Finnish Egmont in 1999.

The strip includes many parodies of pop culture i.e. reality TV shows such as "Date My Mom", "So You Think You Can Dance" etc. and riffs on South Park, Manga, serial killers and more.
