= Hans Aarnes =

Norwegian entrepreneur and journalist (1886–1960)

Hans Aarnes (6 May 1886 – 25 October 1960) was a Norwegian entrepreneur, journalist, newspaper editor, magazine editor, publisher and proponent for the Nynorsk language.

== Early and personal life ==
Aarnes was born in Vatne, Møre og Romsdal as the son of farmer Kristen Nilsson Aarnes and Marta Kristensdotter Vestre. He graduated as shipper in 1904, and worked as a seaman, trader and fisher. In 1907 he published the one-act play Sundagskveld, and in 1933 he published the poetry collection Kviteburd. He was married to Gina Villesvik from 1913.

== Career ==
Aarnes was editor or assistant editor for seven newspapers or magazines. He edited Aarvak from 1909 to 1911. He worked for the newspaper Norig from 1911 to 1913, and edited Hardanger from 1913. From 1916 to 1920 he worked for the newspaper Gula Tidend, and for Bondebladet from 1921 to 1923. He edited the newspaper Agder Tidend from 1923 to 1932.

He established the first education for journalists in Norway, Bladmannaskulen, in 1919, and published a series of handbooks on journalism.

As a proponent for the Nynorsk language he founded the news agency Norsk Pressekontor in 1918. He founded the magazine Nynorsk Vekeblad in 1933. He started the comic series Vangsgutane in Nynorsk Vekeblad as a local alternative to The Katzenjammer Kids, with text by Leif Halse and drawn by Jens R. Nilssen. He was member of the board of Det Norske Teatret from 1935 to 1940, and founded the publishing house Fonna Forlag in 1940. He was initiator of the Nynorsk encyclopedia Norsk Allkunnebok, which was published between 1948 and 1966. He was active in the organization Noregs Mållag, and helped the establishing of several local chapters in the 1950s.
