= Lars Fiske =

Norwegian illustrator and cartoonist

- Born: 21 July 1966; Oslo
- Occupation: Comics artist
- Spouse: Anna Fiske
- Awards: Sproing Award (2004, 2015)

Lars Fiske (born 21 July 1966) is a Norwegian comics writer and artist, and creator of picture books. He was born in Oslo and is married to illustrator and writer Anna Fiske.

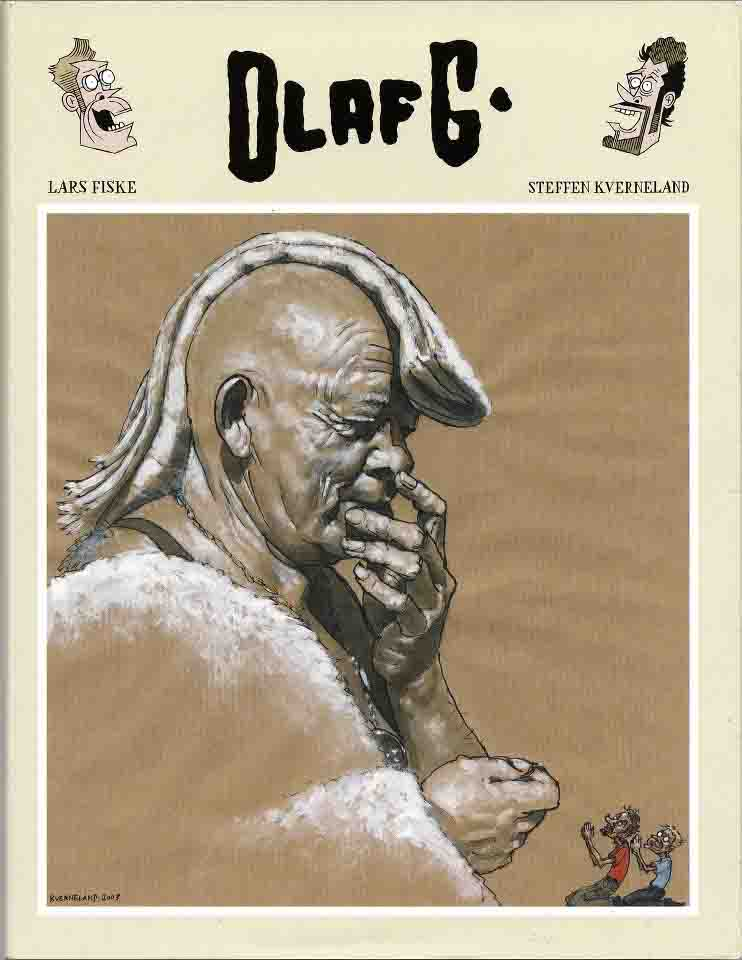
Olaf G, Fiske's and Steffen Kverneland's comics album on Olaf Gulbransson.

Fiske created the album Matje: debutanten in 1996, and the follow-up Matje-ismen in 2000. His album Olaf G. from 2004, which he created in cooperation with Steffen Kverneland, earned them the Sproing Award, and the album was translated into Swedish and German language. Fiske and Kverneland further cooperated on the series Kanon, based on the lives of the painters Edvard Munch and Kurt Schwitters.

Among his picture books is the prize-winning Kom, så løper vi from 2002 and På tre hjul from 2005.
