= Jens R. Nilssen =

Norwegian illustrator (1880–1964)

- Born: 11 August 1880; Valberg, Norway
- Died: 28 February 1964 (aged 83)
- Occupation: Illustrator

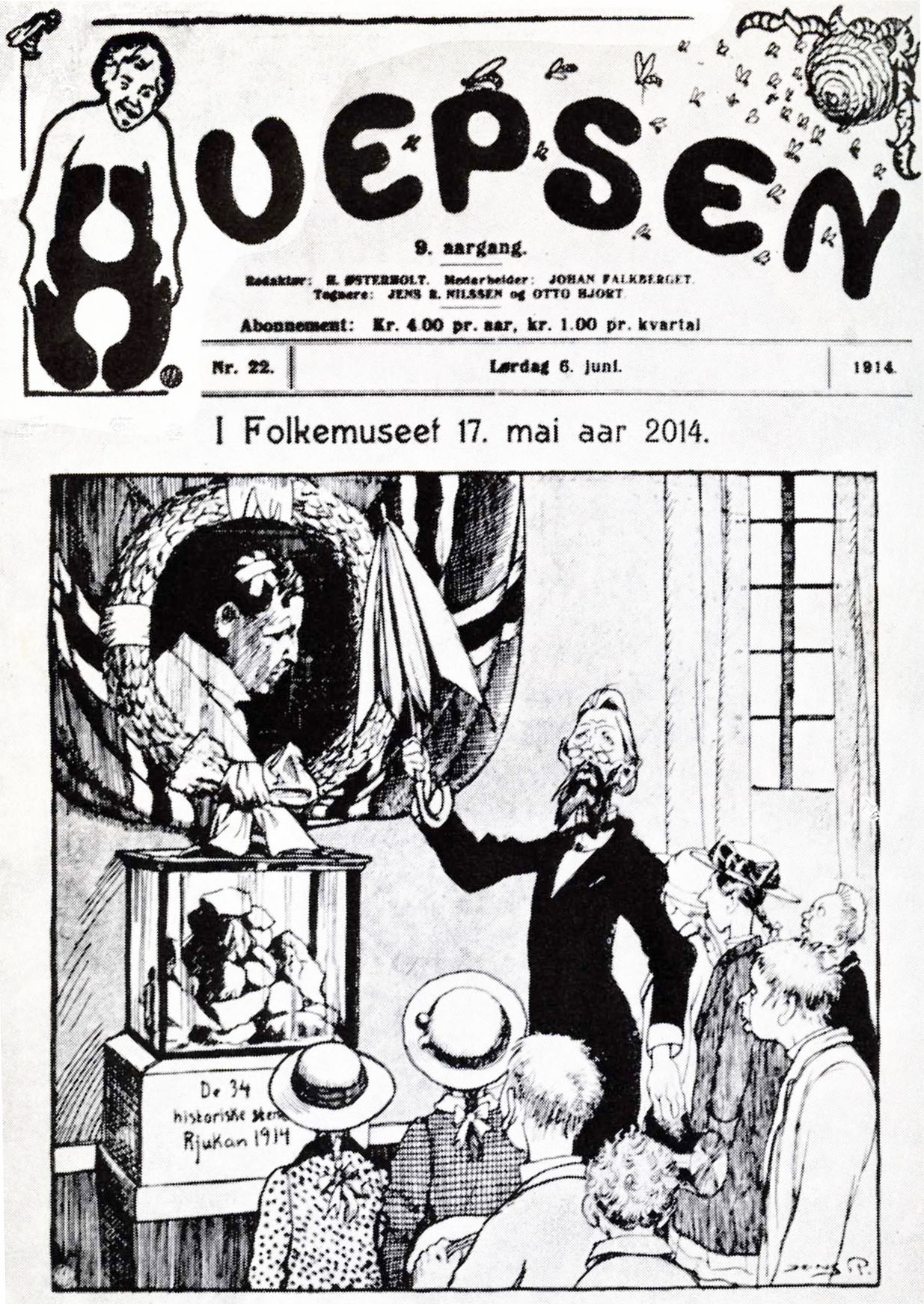
Front page of the satirical magazine Hvepsen (1914)

Jens Richard Nilssen (11 August 1880 – 28 February 1964) was a Norwegian illustrator, comics creator and cartoonist.

Nilssen was born in Valberg, Nordland, and was educated at Statens håndverks- og kunstindustriskole) in Kristiania, at the Norwegian National Academy of Fine Arts, and at Peder Severin Krøyer's painting school in Copenhagen. He delivered illustrations to the satirical magazines Hvepsen, Karikaturen and Humoristen, as well as the weekly magazine Nynorsk Vekeblad and the children's magazine Norsk Barneblad. He illustrated several children's books, and is known for the comic strips Smørbukk, which he created in 1938 along with text writer Andreas Haavoll, Tuss og Troll, Haukepatruljen and Vangsgutane.
