= Marta Breen =

Norwegian non-fiction writer

- Born: 11 April 1976 (age 49)
- Occupations: Journalist; Non-fiction writer
- Spouse: Øyvind Holen
- Relatives: Sigbjørn Hølmebakk (grandfather)

Marta Breen (born 11 April 1976) is a Norwegian non-fiction writer, journalist, and organizational leader. Her books often center on women's history and feminism.

== Early and personal life ==
Born on 11 April 1976, Breen is a granddaughter of writer Sigbjørn Hølmebakk. She spent part of her childhood in Groruddalen in Oslo, and later moved to Larvik, growing up in an environment of political activism of the era of 1970s feminism, political demonstrations and summer camps for children. She graduated from Larvik secondary school in 1995, and is married to Øyvind Holen.

== Career ==
A freelancer, Breen has worked as journalist or columnist for NRK, the newspapers Dagbladet and Dagsavisen, and the women's magazine Kvinner og Klær.

She made her literary debut in 2006 with the book Piker, vin og sang. 50 år med jenter i norsk rock og pop, on women and their challenges in the music industry. In 2008 she wrote a jazz singer's biography, Radka Toneff – hennes korte liv og store stemme ("Radka Toneff – her short life and big voice"). In Rosa Streker, røde tall. Jakten på hva som feiler verdens beste helsevesen from 2011 she writes about pregnancy and birthcare. In 2014 she published Født feminist: hele Norge baker ikke, and in 2015 the book F-ordet. 155 grunner til å være feminist, together with Jenny Jordahl and Madeleine Schultz, for which they received the award Fagbokprisen from the Ministry of Culture.

She collaborated with Jordahl also in her next books: 60 damer du skulle ha møtt. Norsk kvinnehistorie for deg som har det travelt (2016), Den store rumpefeiden (2016), Jeg trodde klitoris var en selskapsdans. Og 300 andre sitater fra kvinner (2017), and Hva vet du om damer? 500 spørsmål for feministiske quizkvelder (2017). Further, Kvinnekamp. Foreningen Skuld: Norges første bøllekurs (2018), on the women's discussion forum Skuld (a forerunner to the Norwegian Association for Women's Rights), and Kvinner i kamp. 150 års kamp for frihet, likhet, søsterskap! (2018). The latter was Breen's international breakthrough, and the book has been translated into twenty languages.

In 2019 she issued the essays collection Om muser og menn, and in 2020 a book on feminism, Hvordan bli (en skandinavisk) feminist. 20 veier til mer likestilling på jobben, i livet og i kjærligheten.

From 2013 to 2018 Breen chaired the Norwegian Non-Fiction Writers and Translators Association.
