= Annasif Døhlen =

Norwegian sculptor (1930–2021)

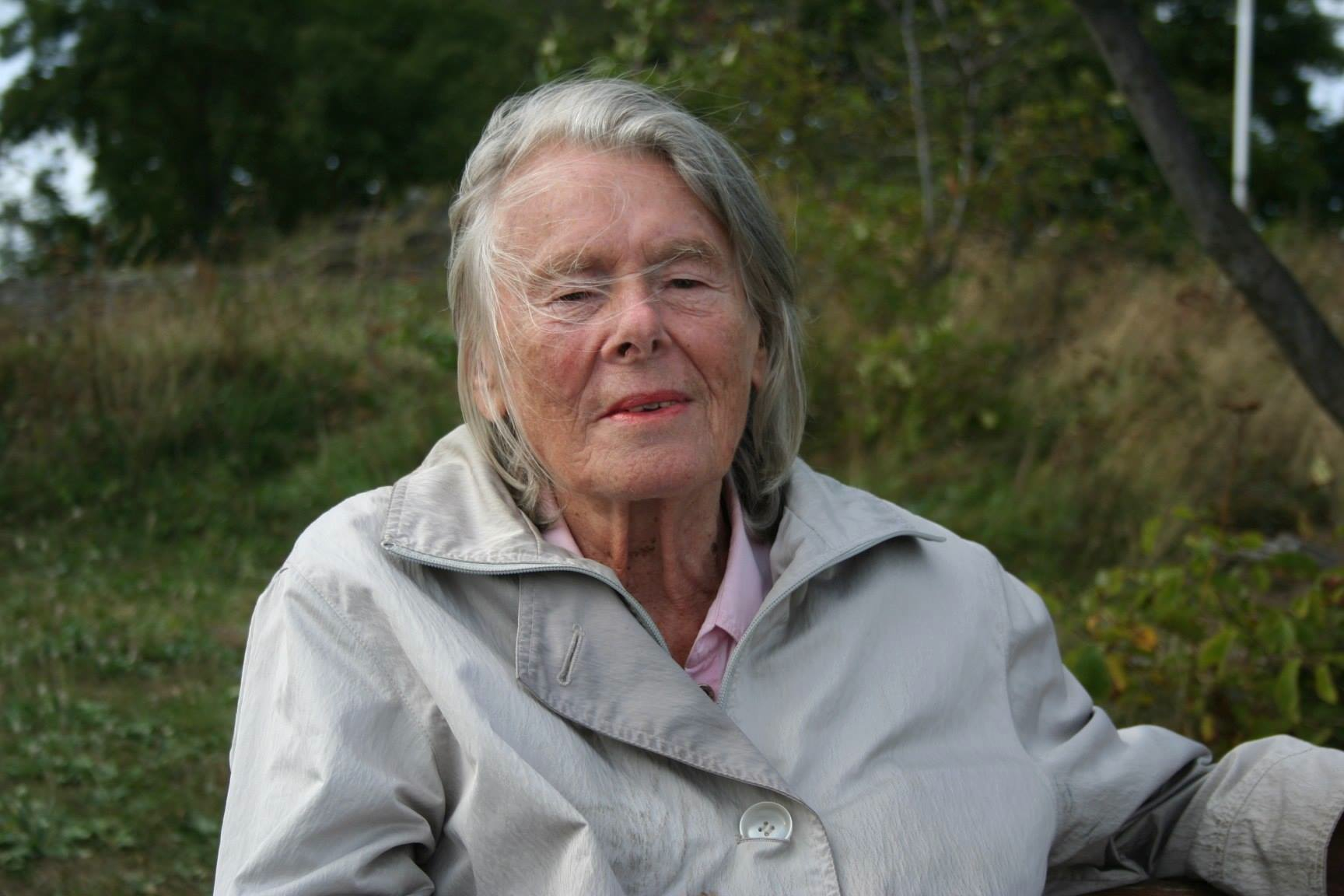
- Born: Anna Sofie Døhlen; 23 June 1930; Stavanger, Norway
- Died: 5 January 2021 (aged 90); Oslo
- Occupation: Sculptor

Annasif Døhlen (23 June 1930 – 5 January 2021) was a Norwegian sculptor.

== Biography ==
Born in Stavanger on 23 June 1930, Døhlen was a daughter of sculptor Aimée Døhlen and Herman Døhlen.

Among her works are portraits of Johan Scharffenberg, Håkon Bleken and David Monrad Johansen, and a sculpture of Olav V of Norway, Skiglede, placed at the Holmenkollen ski arena. Other public sculptures are Ikaros from 1967 at Bygdøy, Oslo, a statue of Vangsgutane, raised in Todalen, Møre, and Plankbærarn in Hommelvik, from 1999. She is represented in the National Gallery of Norway and Riksgalleriet.

She died in Oslo on 5 January 2021.
