= Mads Eriksen (cartoonist) =

Norwegian cartoonist

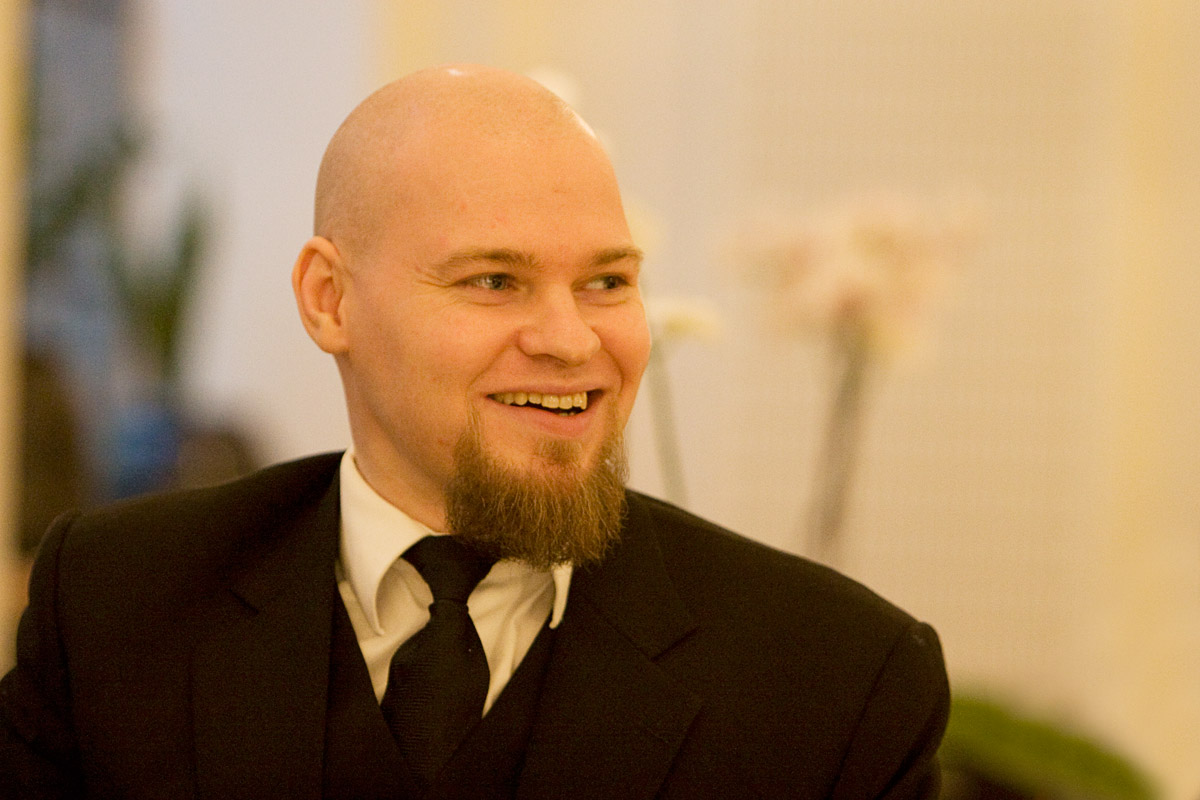
- Born: 15 July 1977 (age 49) Malvik Municipality, Norway
- Area: Cartoonist
- Notable works: Gnom; M
- Awards: full list

Mads Eriksen (born 15 July 1977) is a Norwegian cartoonist, best known for the comic strips M and Gnom.

== Biography ==
Eriksen was born in Malvik Municipality. His career in comics began in 2000, when his first comic strip, Gnom, was accepted into Smult, a magazine dedicated to promoting promising Norwegian cartoonists. Gnom quickly became popular but when Bladkompaniet ceased publication of Smult, Eriksen abandoned Gnom and began his new series, M as a guest strip in the monthly magazine Pondus. The initial of Mads, M is a semi-auto-biographical, surrealistic strip featuring himself and his girlfriend, "Madammen" (English: The Madam). In 2002, M began daily publication in Dagbladet, initially on a "guest" basis, until the strip became a permanent fixture, causing Hägar the Horrible to be removed from the newspaper's comics section.

In 2005 Bladkompaniet published an album containing the complete Gnom, and M got its own dedicated magazine in December 2006 when Schibstedforlagene published the first M magazine, with a new issue once a month. M strips are published six times a week, Monday through Saturday, in the newspapers Dagbladet and Adresseavisen, and subsequently appear on the internet portal start.no. In the summer of 2008, Eriksen stopped producing comic strips, citing the pressure of deadlines and illness as the reason. He told the newspaper Dagens Næringsliv in September 2009 that he had started drawing again.

Mads Eriksen currently lives in Trondheim. A self-declared geek, he is a big fan of several popular cultural phenomena, especially Star Wars.

With a comeback in Pondus # 10/21 in november 2021, Mads Eriksen has started to draw cartoons once again after his burnout in early 2010s.

== Awards ==
- 2002: Raptus debutantprisen
- 2003: Dagbladets seriekonkurranse

== Sources ==
- M albums M book, M magazine Schibsted (in Norwegian)
- Archive link to https://serienett.no/aktuelt/mads-eriksen/

Footnotes
