= Terje Nordberg =

- Born: 21 November 1949
- Occupations: Comics artist, comics writer and magazine editor
- Awards: Sproing Award (1988)

Terje Nordberg (born 21 November 1949) is a Norwegian comics artist, comics writer and magazine editor. He lives in San Jose, California with his wife Nancy. He is also a painter having painted scenes of California, often with whimsical cows.

He started making comics strips for Gateavisa in the late 1960s. Among his later contributions is text for the album series Truls og Trine, Reodor og Teodor and Troll, with Arild Midthun as the artist. He was awarded the Sproing Award in 1988, for the album Troll: Sølvskatten.
