= Øyvind Holen =

Norwegian writer

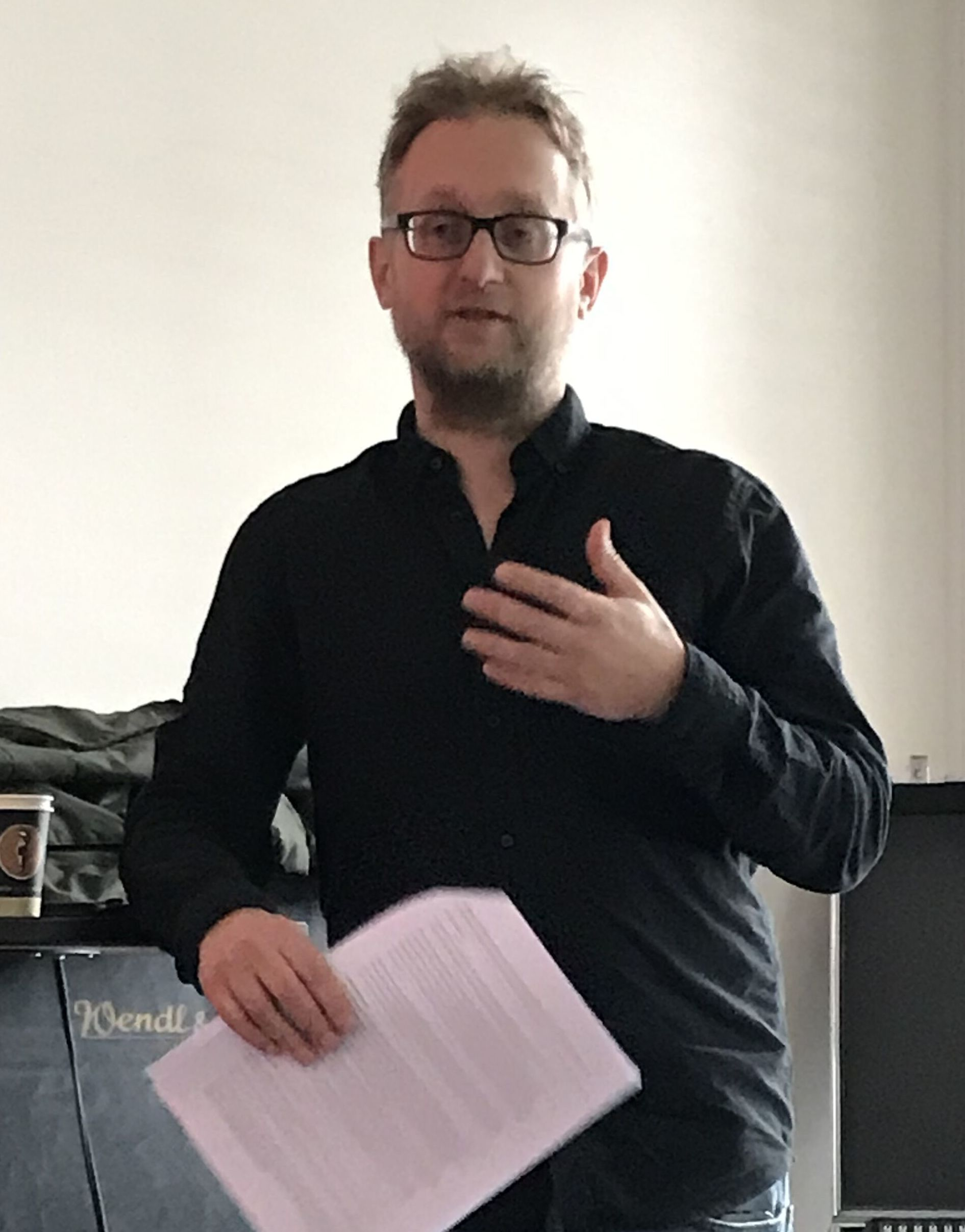
- Born: 4 January 1973 (age 53); Oslo, Norway
- Spouse: Marta Breen
- Awards: Sproing Award (2012)

Øyvind Holen (born 4 January 1973) is a Norwegian journalist, comics creator and non-fiction writer.

== Personal life ==
Holen hails from Lindeberg, a district in Groruddalen, Oslo. He was born on 4 January 1973, and is married to Marta Breen.

== Career ==
A journalist, Holen has worked for or contributed to a number of newspapers, including Aftenposten, Dagsavisen, VG, Klassekampen, Bergens Tidende, Morgenbladet, Osloposten, Ny Tid, and Dagens Næringsliv.

He made his book debut in 2004 with the hiphop documentary Hiphop-hoder: Fra Beat Street til bygde-rap. His next books were Groruddalen: En reiseskildring (2005), Hiphop: Graffiti, rap, breaking, dj-ing (2009), and Faktaløve: Hiphop (2010). He was awarded the Sproing Award in 2012 for the comics album Drabant, shared with illustrator Mikael Noguchi. Further books are Donald-landet (2012), Jævla bra byline (2014), Tegneserienes historie (2015), Getto (2021), and B.O.L.T Warhead. The Re Enforcement from 2022 (about an album by the Norwegian rap group B.O.L.T. Warhead).
