= Smørbukk =

Norwegian comic strip)

Smørbukk is a Norwegian comic strip. It was started in 1938 by text writer Andreas Haavoll and illustrator Jens R. Nilssen. The first Smørbukk story was based on the fairytale Buttercup collected by Asbjørnsen and Moe. The strip appears in the children's magazine Norsk Barneblad, as well as in separate albums. From 1959/1960 to 1983 the series was illustrated by Solveig Muren Sanden. Later text writers have been Øyvind Dybwad and Johannes Farestveit. From 1983 Håkon Aasnes took over as illustrator. The anniversary book Smørbukk 70 år was published in 2008.

== Legacy ==
In 1973, Solveig Muren Sanden and Johannes Farestveit received the first Comics Prize awarded by the Norwegian Ministry of Culture. In 2012 a bronze sculpture of "Smørbukk", made by Trygve Barstad, was unveiled in Vrådal, the home village of illustrator Solveig Muren Sanden.
