= Bud Grace =

American cartoonist

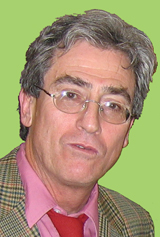
- Grace at the 2004 Gothenburg Book Fair
- Born: c. 1944 Chester, Pennsylvania, U.S.
- Areas: Writer, penciller, inker
- Pseudonym: Buddy Valentine
- Notable works: Piranha Club

Bud Grace (born c. 1944) is an American cartoonist, primarily known for the comic strip Ernie, later retitled as Piranha Club in the United States. He also drew the Babs and Aldo comic strip for King under the pseudonym Buddy Valentine.

== Early life and education ==
Grace was born in Chester, Pennsylvania, grew up in Sarasota, Florida, and later resided for several years in Oakton, Virginia. He met his wife Lorraine while at Florida State University (FSU). They have a son, Allen. Grace has a Ph.D. in physics from FSU, and worked as a nuclear physicist at FSU before becoming a cartoonist in 1979.

== Career ==
Before establishing his career as a themed comic strip artist he published individual cartoons in magazines such as Playboy and Hustler, as well as more conventional publications. Ernie was launched on February 1, 1988. Grace frequently appeared in his own comic strip, often ending up in a straitjacket. From Virginia, he traveled extensively on promotional tours in Europe, where his cartoons remain very popular as American newspapers saw declines or the total elimination of comics sections. He has been active in cartoon industry activities throughout his career. At one point, he was active in the establishment of the National Cartoon Museum when it moved to Boca Raton, Florida, in 1992. In 1996, it became the International Museum of Cartoon Art. It was the brainchild of Mort Walker, the creator of Beetle Bailey and had gone through several later transitions until its contents were relocated to Ohio State University in 2008.

In 1989, the Swedish Academy of Comic Art awarded Bud Grace the Adamson Statuette. Grace received the National Cartoonist Society Newspaper Comic Strip Award for 1993 for his work on the strip.

In early 2017, Grace and his wife decided they had no need to endure cold winters and he relocated to a new home in Bradenton, Florida, near his childhood home in Sarasota. He retired from cartooning in February 2018.

Over the last 20 years, Grace has enjoyed singing blues style songs and appeared at piano bars in the Washington metropolitan area, and now is seeking new venues in the Tampa Bay area.
