= Piranha Club =

Comic strip

- Title panel for Piranha Club Sunday strips.
- Author: Bud Grace
- Current status/schedule: Running
- Launch date: February 1, 1988
- End date: February 3, 2018
- Alternate name: Ernie (1988–1998)
- Syndicate(s): King Features Syndicate
- Genre: Humor

Piranha Club was a comic strip written and illustrated by Bud Grace. It was originally called Ernie, but the title was changed in 1998. The club is meant as a parody on Lions Club International, and the strip made its debut in February 1988. In 1989, the Swedish Academy of Comic Art awarded Bud Grace with the Adamson Statuette. Grace received the 1993 National Cartoonists Society's Newspaper Comic Strip Award for his work on the strip.

The strip is highly popular in the Scandinavian countries Norway and Sweden, where it is published in a bimonthly (previously monthly) comic book under the original title, Ernie. It is also one of the most popular comic strips regularly published in newspapers in Estonia and Latvia (if not the most popular). It is published in Scandinavia's largest and second largest newspapers by circulation, Aftonbladet and Dagens Nyheter. It is also syndicated to Japan's The Japan News along with Calvin and Hobbes.

In January 2018, Bud Grace announced his retirement on his website. The final strip ran on February 3, 2018, after 30 years.

== Characters ==
- The Piranha Club is a society of freeloaders, hustlers and other shady characters who will do anything to make a quick buck. It also houses an actual piranha named Earl who serves as the club's mascot and trash compactor. This piranha is so voracious he will bite and eat everything within reach of his teeth. Earl is also able to painfully repel the attacks of the cat Bobo.
- Ernie Floyd used to be the strip's main character until stories shifted more toward Sid and the Piranha Club members. Originally, Ernie was portrayed as something of a loser, but he gradually evolved into a more normal person. He has held various jobs but usually works as an assistant manager at the Mr. Squid fast-food restaurant. He owns a 1957 DeSoto and has a fetish for toasters. In July 2011, Ernie married his longtime girlfriend, Doris Husselmeyer. The happy couple became the proud parents of a daughter, Fillmore Floyd, in August 2011.
- Sid Fernwilter, Ernie's uncle and member of the Piranha Club, is a hustler who will do just about anything to make a quick buck when he's not trying to scam a few dollars from his nephew or mooch a free meal. When the strip's editors pointed out to Bud Grace that no one would voluntarily be friends with someone like Sid, he became Ernie's uncle. Sid isn't completely black-and-white in his crook behavior. He does have limits and never actually harms anyone, even if he succeeds in scamming them out of their savings. He also believes that actual robbery is beneath him.
- Doris Husselmeyer is Ernie's wife. In the early years of the strip, Doris was unattractive with greasy hair and coke-bottle glasses, and stories were often about Ernie trying to break up with Doris without hurting her feelings. Doris eventually became a lot more attractive. She was at one time courted by Arnold, much to Ernie's anger, but Arnold gave up. Doris owns a vicious cat named Bobo who attacks Ernie at every opportunity. Bobo tries sometimes also to eat Earl, only to end up each time viciously bitten by the voracious piranha. Pregnant with Ernie's child, she eventually accepted his proposal.
- Ethel "Effie" Munyon is Ernie's elderly and absent-minded landlady. A former Miss Bayonne, she has been married 12 times and is dating Sid, although Sid mostly hangs around with her to get a free meal. Effie is a terrible cook and usually serves Sid dishes like boiled octopus or deep-fried roadkill. Then again, according to Sid, "the only thing better than a good meal is a free meal." She constantly calls Ernie Harold and often mistakes other men for her ex-husbands.
- Arnold Arnoldski is a homely, overweight and bad-complected 19-year-old who often hangs out with Sid and frequently becomes involved in his schemes. As Ernie evolved into a more normal person, many of his loser characteristics were transferred to Arnold. Arnold often ends up as pack mule for Sid's schemes, and his more notable jobs include bungie-jumping tester, car alarm, goat herder, torpedo man and wrestler under the name The Masked Slapper.
- Dr. Enos Pork, MD, is the most incompetent doctor north of Tierra del Fuego and is Sid's best friend. He is a heavy smoker and a member of the Piranha Club. He is married, and his abusive wife (real name: Barbara Packer Pork) is usually referred to only as Frau Pork. He also clashes frequently with his equally abusive mother-in-law, known as Mother Packer, whose name is inspired by Alferd Packer, a 19th-century cannibal from Colorado. Both Frau Pork and Mother Packer often end up abusing Dr. Pork by beating him into a bloody pulp.
- Spencer Husselmeyer is Doris's 10-year-old brother. He is a mischievous brat who makes Bart Simpson seem a Boy Scout in comparison. He has a special affection of putting grease on doorknobs, toilet seats or anything else he can apply it to and especially loves to practice on his sister's former boyfriend (now husband), Ernie.
- Elvis Zimmerman is a used-car salesman and member of the Piranha Club. He is often depicted as Sid's rival for the title "Piranha of the Year", though also considered among Sid's best friends along with Reverend Bob and Enos.
- Reverend Bob is a televangelist and is also a prominent member of the Piranha Club. He has no problem using his status as a reverend for his own profit, and always keeps the collection money from his congregation for himself. Ethel is a singer at his church, and often used as "encouragement" for more generous donations.
- "Slick" Willie O'Haberman is an ambulance-chasing attorney, who is also a member of the Piranha Club. He is notorious for being able and willing to sue anyone for anything, a fact his mother begrudges. He even tried to sue himself for malpractice, much to the confusion of his fellow Piranhas as how it would yield any money. The character was originally "Slick" Willie Haberman but was changed after Grace received complaints from the Anti-Defamation League.
- Quacko, the human duck. It is unknown whether he is a duck that looks like a human or a human that looks like a duck.
- Beardo the Bearded Lady, is married to Quacko. She doesn't really have a beard but a stock of fake beards. She has a secret affair with Arnold and also had a brief affair with Zerblatt.
- Zerblatt is a space alien from the planet Grelzak, married to a gorgeous Earthling woman and having about 100 frog-human hybrid children with her.
- Barnacle Bill the Parrot is a Colombian parrot who lives in Ernie's apartment from time to time. Also often dresses up in the squid costume used as a mascot for Squid Burgers.
- Duane is a drunk who frequently tries to, with the help of a frog, to get people to buy him a drink. He, and his frog, have had several minor adventures. During one particular storyline, he used a cockroach dressed as Elvis to raise money and had Ernie arrested for murder after he killed it.
- Bud Grace, a former nuclear physicist turned cartoonist, frequently makes appearances in his own comic strip, where he constantly sends himself to the loony bin (often as a form of dropping the cow when a joke has gone on for too long and no satisfying end is in sight).

Bud Grace making an appearance in a December 13, 2007 strip.

== Setting ==
The characters reside in or around Bayonne, New Jersey, which is where most of the storylines take place. The characters are shown around their city block, in their apartments, at church and in their club. Prominent scene locations include:

- Ernie's house, formerly a primary setting for romantic encounters between Ernie and Doris (when they were dating), now (since their marriage) often used as background for their interactions with Fillmore, their daughter
- Effie's house, usually as the setting for Effie serving a questionable meal to Uncle Sid
- The local church where Reverend Bob preaches
- The local grade school that Spencer attends
- Used car lot operated by Elvis Zimmerman

== Style ==
While the strip is usually stand alone, on many occasions it is serialized with the story running for a week or more on some occasions. The daily strip usually runs to four panels. The Sunday strip is in a three-by-three panel format with the strip logo appearing in the top left panel.

== Languages ==
- English: Ernie (later The Piranha Club)
- Danish: Erling (Piranha Klubben)
- Estonian: Ernie (Piraaja Klubi)
- Swedish: Ernie
- Finnish: Hannes
- Norwegian: Ernie
- Latvian: Ērnijs (later Piraju klubs)
- Dutch: Jan Jurk
- Italian: Ernie

== Books ==
Title	Publication Date	Publisher	ISBN
Trust Me!	February 1990	Avon Books	ISBN 0-3807-6069-X
Ernie: Out of Control	September 1996	Andrews McMeel Publishing	ISBN 0-8362-2123-0
Ernie and the Piranha Club: 2009-2010	September 2016	Squid, Inc.	ISBN 978-0988709836
Ernie and the Piranha Club: 1995-1996	July 2017	Squid, Inc.	ISBN 978-0988709867
