= Madagascar–Norway relations =

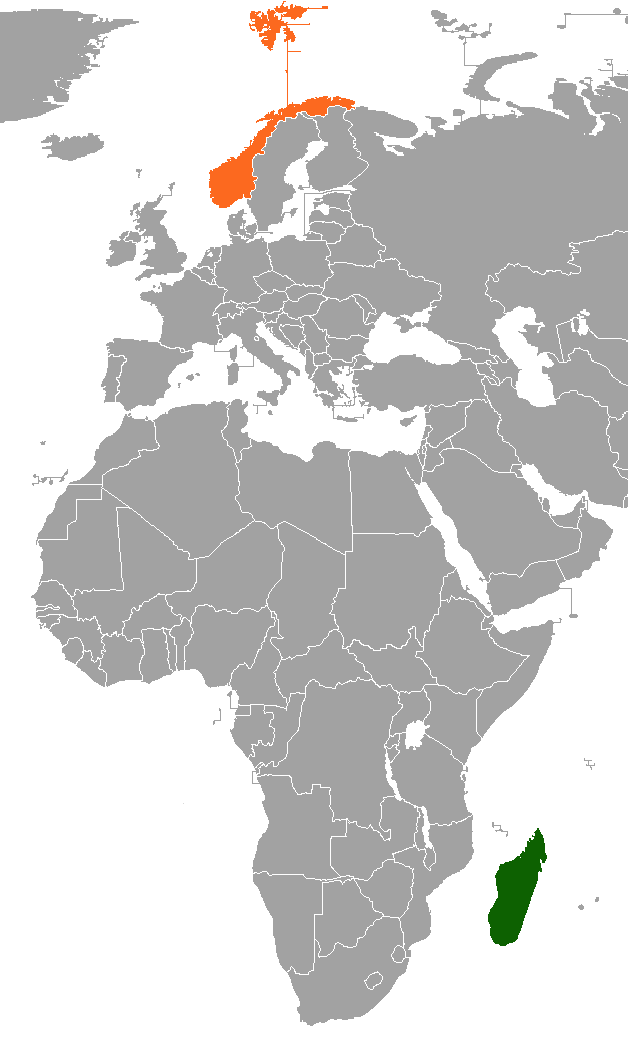
- Madagascar: Norway

Madagascar–Norway relations are the bilateral relations between Madagascar and Norway. Norway has an "embassy office" in Antananarivo, subordinate to the embassy in Pretoria. Madagascar has an honorary consulate in Oslo.

== History ==
The relations commenced in the 1860s and centered around Evangelical-Lutheran mission. The Norwegian Missionary Society chose Madagascar as its second field of mission, after what is now South Africa. Former government minister Erik Solheim participated in NMS' 150-year anniversary for Malagasy mission. The mission has also been criticized for being racist and Eurocentric. In the 1890s, maps were issued in Norway where the areas of Madagascar hitherto untouched by mission, were colored as pitch-black. Lutheran mission shrunk after the Malagasy Lutheran Church became more self-sustained.

From the 1960s, the relations shifted to development aid. Already the Lutheran missionaries had been engaged in diaconal work, building bible schools, basic schools, hospitals, combatting leprosy, and agricultural development. Tombontsoa agricultural school, established in 1965 in Vakinankaratra, was modelled on Tomb agricultural school in Norway. The cattle breed Norwegian Red was imported to Madagascar and eventually crossbred with zebu. In 1972, the agricultural project Fifamanor started to improve the production of grain, potato and milk. Though Norway opened its embassy in Antananarivo in 2004, the state-to-state aid was frozen after the 2009 Malagasy political crisis. The state-to-state aid was replaced with Norwegian support through Unicef, ILO, FAO and UNDP on one hand, and time-limited projects on the other, which even included the jazz festival Malajazzcar. The Norwegian embassy in Antananarivo was degraded in 2010.

== See also ==
- Foreign relations of Madagascar
- Foreign relations of Norway
