= Norsk Barneblad =

Norwegian children's magazine

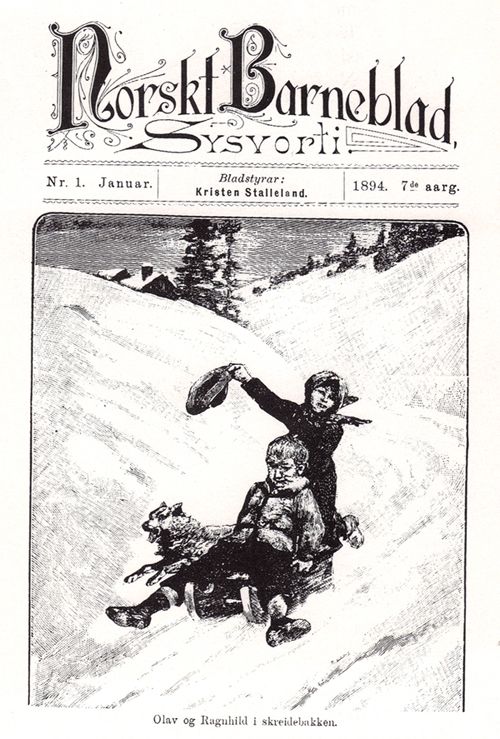
- Norskt Barneblad no.1, 1894
- Categories: Children's magazine
- Frequency: Monthly
- Founded: 1887
- Country: Norway
- Based in: Grimstad (1887–1902); Oslo (1902–64), Larvik (1964–91); Oslo (1992–)
- Language: Norwegian (nynorsk)

Norsk Barneblad (Norwegian: the Norwegian Children’s Magazine) is a Norwegian children's magazine, issued monthly in Nynorsk. It was founded by Kristen Stalleland in 1887, under the name Sysvorti, was renamed to Norskt Barneblad in 1891, and to the current name Norsk Barneblad from 1916. It had a circulation of 3,600 copies in 2004, while its circulation was 11–17,000 copies between 1916 and 1985. Among its best known comics strips is Smørbukk, which has been published on the back cover of the magazine since 1938. Among its editors was Andreas Haavoll, who edited the magazine for nearly forty years.

== See also ==
- Norwegian literature
