= Rocky (comic strip) =

- Front cover of the 2005 English-language collection The Big Payback.
- Author: Martin Kellerman
- Website: http://www.rocky-digital.com/ Official website
- Launch date: 1998
- Genre: Humour

Rocky is a Swedish autobiographical comic strip created by Martin Kellerman, focusing on an anthropomorphic dog, Rocky, and his friends in their everyday life in Stockholm.

== Overview ==
Rocky is based on Kellerman's own life. According to Kellerman, "My friends are just such perfect cartoon characters. A lot of times they say things and all I have to do is write it down. Their personalities match and complement each other so well, it's impossible not to write it down. If I wait a while, even the upsetting stuff they can still laugh about."

Some of the humor draws from hip hop culture, and the dialogue sometimes incorporates English phrases. Kellerman states that "when a Swede says something like Jay-Z would say, that's automatically funny. It's still white here, but in Sweden, it's funnier. Most of my friends have grown up on hip-hop, but it's like a joke—we're so not gangsta."

The comic has been translated to Norwegian, Danish, Finnish, Serbian, English, Spanish, and French, either as a running strip or collected in book form.

== History ==
Kellerman created Rocky after his girlfriend broke up with him and he was fired from his job as a cartoonist for a pornographic magazine. He decided to draw a comic strip about his current situation to entertain himself and his friends and did not initially take it seriously. The strip was picked up by the free newspaper Metro and moved from publication to publication because multiple newspapers canceled the strip in response to reader complaints over its profanity and sexual content.

The strips have been collected in several books, first one published in 1999. Fantagraphics Books published two volumes of the strip, translated into English, in 2005 and 2008. Kellerman also publishes Rocky as a magazine, featuring comic strips and other material, including interviews with hip hop artists such as 50 Cent, M.I.A. and The Game drawn in comic form. Rocky has also been performed as a touring play in Sweden in 2000. 13 episodes of an animated TV series were produced, and have been released on DVD.
