= Martin Kellerman =

Swedish cartoonist (born 1973)

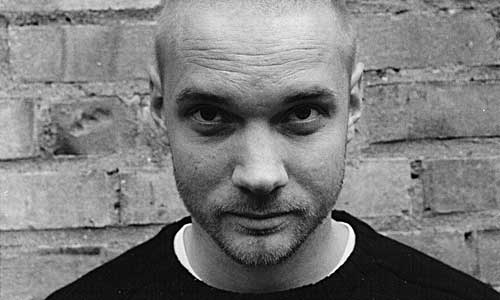
- Born: 24 December 1973 (age 52) Växjö, Sweden
- Area: cartoonist
- Notable works: Rocky
- Awards: 2000 Urhunden Prize

Martin Kellerman (born 1973 in Växjö) is a Swedish cartoonist, known for the comic strip Rocky.

He was influenced by American and Swedish underground cartoonists such as Peter Bagge, Max Andersson, Robert Crumb, Harvey Pekar, Joe Matt and Mats Jonsson. Kellerman states that his work resembles "a mixture between really dark comics and commercial stuff like MAD. That's why to [underground cartoonists] I'm considered a commercial artist."

After his girlfriend broke up with him and he was fired from his job as a cartoonist for a pornographic magazine, he created the autobiographical anthropomorphic animal comic strip Rocky, about a grumpy, horny, hip-hop-loving dog and cartoonist living in Stockholm. Kellerman drew the strip as a means of dealing with his current situation and entertaining himself and his friends, but did not initially take it seriously. The strip was picked up by the free newspaper Metro, and moved from publication to publication because multiple newspapers canceled the strip in response to reader complaints over its profanity and sexual content.
