= Bjørn Ousland =

Norwegian illustrator, children's writer and comics writer

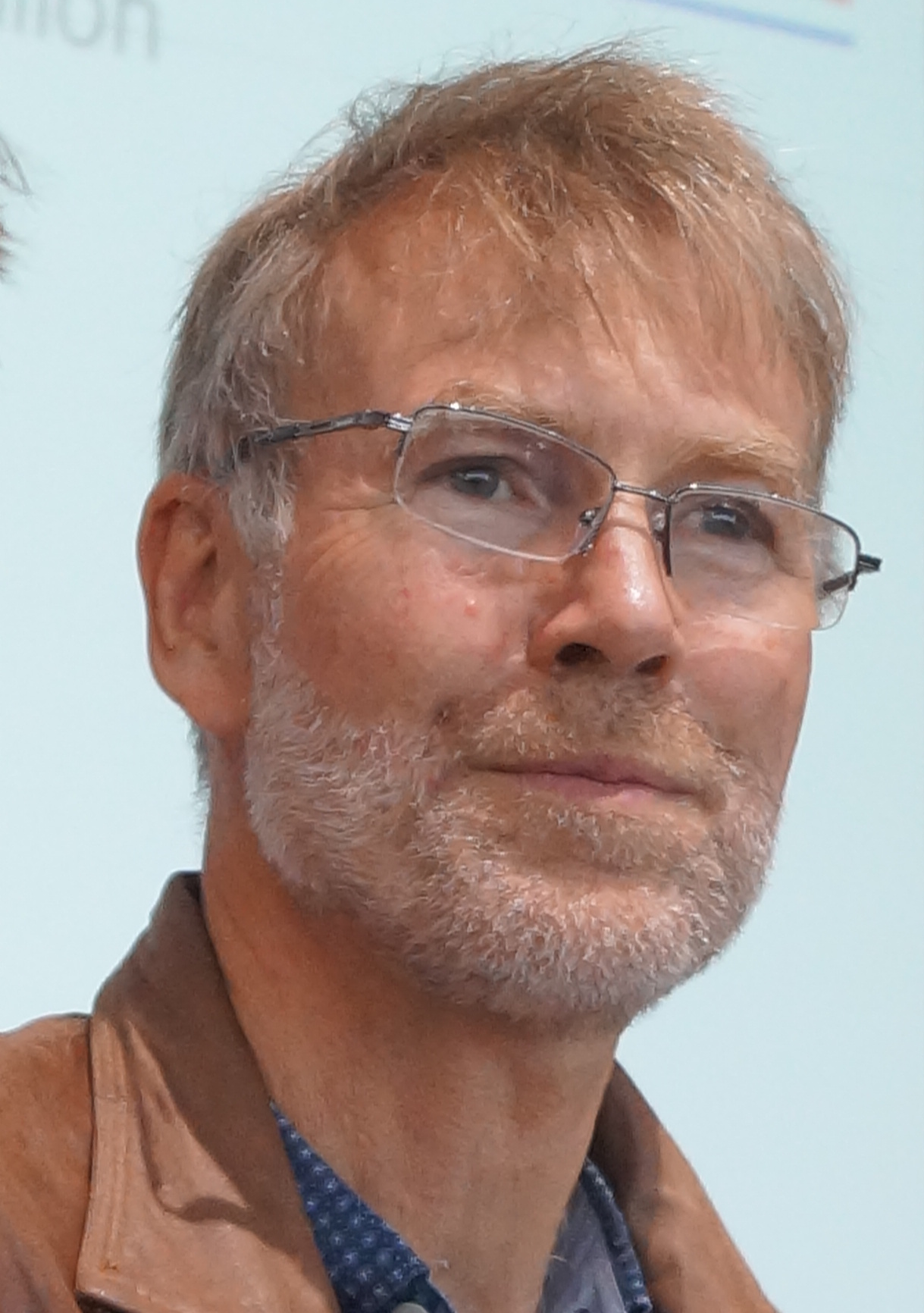
- Bjørn Ousland at the Frankfurt Book Fair 2019.
- Born: 14 May 1959 (age 66); Oslo, Norway
- Occupations: Illustrator, comics writer and children's writer
- Awards: Brage Prize (2007)

Bjørn Ousland (born 14 May 1959) is a Norwegian illustrator, children's writer and comics writer. His breakthrough was the album series Solruns saga from 1988 to 1993. Among his later albums are Mumle Gåsegg from 1999, Soria Moria slott from 2000, and Grimsborken from 2002, all adapted from Norwegian fairy tales. He was awarded the Brage Prize (open class) in 2007, jointly with Jon Ewo.
