= Frode Øverli =

Norwegian cartoonist

- Born: 15 August 1968 (age 58) Bergen, Norway
- Area: cartoonist
- Notable works: Pondus; Riskhospitalet; Rutetid
- Awards: full list

Frode Øverli (born 15 August 1968 in Bergen, Norway) is a Norwegian comic strip cartoonist, considered one of the most successful in Scandinavia.

== Biography ==
He began his career in 1984 when his parodies of The Phantom became a regular feature in the Norwegian publication of the Phantom serial comic book. At that time, Frode was still a student, but dedicated much of his time to writing.

Two years later, he was a regular cartoonist for the recently launched humour magazine Pyton, notable for its gratuitous toilet humour. In the beginning he illustrated stories written by authors Dag E. Kolstad, John Kåre Raake, and later Bjørn Ousland. However, he eventually resigned to write his own material, as it was limited what the others could write for him. The best known comic strips from his Pyton period are Deep Shit Junkies, a comic about a heavy metal band, and Birger-Egil, about a pair of siamese twins with completely different personalities.

In 1997 he decided to start working on his own, and eventually split with Pyton. He created a strip first titled A-laget, about three soccer supporters, but the concept evolved into what became the strip Pondus, one of Scandinavia's most successful comic strips of all time. Along with Pondus, he also created two other comics series, Riskhospitalet (The Risk Hospital - a wordplay on the name of prominent Norwegian hospital, Rikshospitalet (National Hospital)), but Øverli discontinued this series when Pondus gained unexpected popularity. In 2000 he began creating the single panel cartoon Rutetid (a pun on "transportation schedule" and "time for a panel"), published in Pondus and other publications.

Øverli is a cartoonist, considered one of the most successful in Scandinavia. He has received the Norwegian Sproing Award twice; in 1998 following the first Pondus album, Alt for Norge (All for Norway, named after Harald V's royal motto) and in 2003 for the Pondus Christmas album Pondus Julespesial. In 2006 he received the prestigious Swedish Adamson Award.

In addition to his cartoon work, Øverli has provided illustrations for several books.

He currently lives on the Norwegian west-coast island Askøy.

== Bibliography ==

=== Comic strips ===
| Series | Years | Publication |
|---|---|---|
| The Deep Shit Junkies | c.1989-1996 | Pyton |
| Birger-Egil | c.1992-1996 | Pyton |
| Pondus | 1995–present | Pondus |
| Jubben & Toxi | 1996–1999 | Bellona Magasin |
| Riskhospitalet | 1997–2000 | Geek |
| Rutetid | 2000–present | Pondus |

=== Norwegian volumes ===
| Series | Year | Publisher | ISBN |
|---|---|---|---|
| Pondus | | | |
| 1. Første omgang | 2001 | Schibsted | ISBN 82-509-4551-4 |
| 2. Andre omgang | 2002 | Schibsted | ISBN 82-509-4788-6 |
| 3. Hat trick | 2003 | Schibsted | ISBN 82-509-4955-2 |
| 4. Flat firer | 2004 | Schibsted | ISBN 82-509-5204-9 |
| 5. Fem rette | 2005 | Schibsted | ISBN 82-509-5409-2 |
| 6. 0-6 | 2006 | Schibsted | ISBN 82-509-5592-7 |
| 7. Sju lange og sju breie | 2007 | Egmont | ISBN 978-82-429-3132-0 |
| 8. 8. Divisjon | 2008 | Egmont | ISBN 978-82-429-3697-4 |
| 9. Nummer 9 | 2009 | Egmont | ISBN 978-82-429-4059-9 |
| Riskhospitalet | 2004 | Schibsted | ISBN 82-509-5141-7 |

=== French volumes ===
| Series | Year | Publisher | ISBN |
|---|---|---|---|
| Pondus | | | |
| 1. Première mi-temps | 2005 | Odin | ISBN 2-913167-47-0 |
| 2. Seconde mi-temps | 2006 | Odin | ISBN 2-913167-50-0 |

== Awards ==
- 1998: Sproing Award, for Pondus, Alt for Norge
- 2003: Sproing Award, for Pondus, Julespesial
- 2006: Adamson Award, for Pondus

== Sources ==
- Frode Øverli and Pondus dossier Avistegnernes hus (in Norwegian)

Footnotes
