= Vesaas =

Vesaas is a surname. Notable people with the surname include:

- Guri Vesaas (born 1939), Norwegian writer and translator
- Halldis Moren Vesaas (1907–1995), Norwegian poet, writer and translator
- Olav Vesaas (born 1935), Norwegian broadcast journalist and writer
- Tarjei Vesaas (1897–1970), Norwegian poet and writer
