= Odd Nordstoga =

Norwegian singer, musician, actor and editor

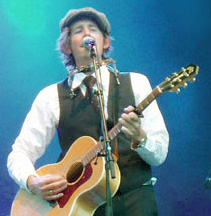
- Drammen Elvefestival 2004

Background information
- Born: 10 December 1972 (age 53)
- Origin: Vinje, Norway
- Genre: Folk
- Instruments: Guitar, Accordion, Piano
- Years active: 1997–present
- Website: www.oddnordstoga.no

Odd Nordstoga (born 10 December 1972) is a folk singer, musician, actor and editor from Vinje Municipality in Telemark, Norway. In 2004, he went from relative obscurity to becoming the country's biggest selling recording artist, with the phenomenal success of his first solo album proper, "Luring". The album, a fusion of pop and Norwegian folk music, has sold more than 160,000 copies in Norway to date and earned him several Spellemannsprisen awards. For the album Strålande Jul, released together with Sissel Kyrkjebø, he won an unprecedented 11 Norwegian platinum trophies.

== Personal life ==
Nordstoga grew up at Plassen in Vinje Municipality, Telemark, the homestead of author Aasmund Olavsson Vinje. He hails from a hugely cultural family. His mother, Ellen Bojer Nordstoga is a folk singer. His father, Olav Nordstoga is a folk singer, former politician and the chairman of the Vinje Literary Days. In addition, brother Aasmund Nordstoga has made a name for himself as a singer, dancer, actor and radio and TV presenter. Organist Kåre Nordstoga is his second cousin.

Nordstoga resides in Lambertseter, a borough of Oslo, together with his wife and three children.

== Early career ==
His career as a recording artist spans 8 years. He made his debut as a recording artist in 1997 with the band Something Odd and their self-titled debut. This album earned them a record deal with BMG Norway and they swiftly released the follow-up Solreven in 1998. Two minor radio-hits, the folk rock inspired "Fuggel i Karmen" and the haunting ballad "Ingen eg kjenner", came out of this album, but the album sold poorly and the band was dropped from their label. In 2000, Odd Nordstoga changed the name of Something Odd to simply Nordstoga, signed to the Norwegian label Grappa and released a more pop music oriented self-titled album. A couple of minor radio hits, "Dag" and "Bie på deg", ensued. Nordstoga won Norway's prestigious Edvardprisen Award for "Bie på Deg". However, soon afterwards they disbanded.

Between 2001–2003, Odd Nordstoga concentrated most of his efforts towards the more traditional folk music of Telemark. With his other band Blåmann Blåmann (named after the poem by Aasmund O. Vinje), consisting of Nordstoga and his friends from Vinje, guitarist Asgaut H. Bakken, flute player Silje Hegg and harding fiddle virtuoso Lars Underdal, he released a self-titled album to great reviews in 2001, and scored a radio hit in "Tippe Tippe Tuve". In 2002 he teamed up with highly respected Norwegian folk musician Øyonn Groven Myhren (amongst other things known from the folk ensemble Dvergmål) to write, perform and release the album Nivelkinn, based on poems by Telemark poet Aslaug Vaa. This collaboration scored a couple of minor radio hits in "Uppi Måneskin" and "Guten og Folen", and earned them the Spellemannprisen award (Norwegian equivalent of the Grammy) in 2003 for best folk music album. Nordstoga was also involved in a book release in 2002, namely the song book Song for deg og meg (Song for you and me) which he edited, consisting of children songs written in Nynorsk, one of Norway's two written standards. In 2014 he received the Nynorsk User of the Year award.

== Breakthrough ==
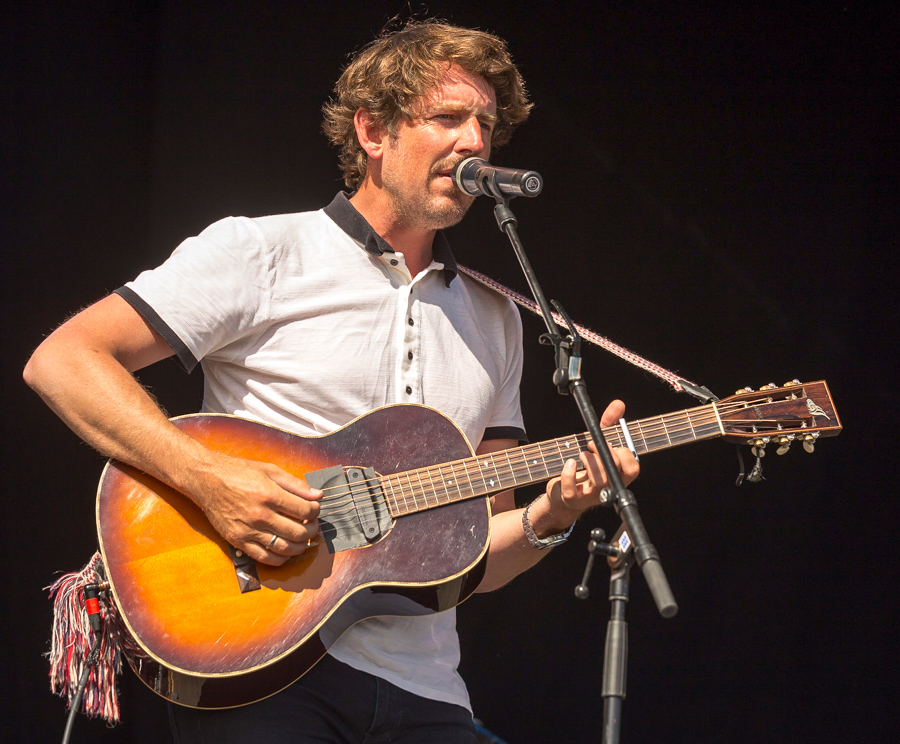
Nordstoga at Stavernfestivalen in Norway in 2016

It was also in 2003 that the mainstream opened its eyes to Nordstoga as he teamed up with famous singer/actress/writer Herborg Kråkevik to write and perform the title track from her Édith Piaf-cabaret, entitled Eg & Edith. The cabaret and its soundtrack, although greatly anticipated, was a minor flop in terms of album sales and tickets sold, whereas the title track proved to be a nice radio hit for the duo. Nordstoga, together with lyricist Stein Versto (another Vinje native), also contributed with the track "Rosevev" on this album.

Nordstoga had previously worked with Kråkevik in the film Det Rare, based on a short story by famous Norwegian writer Tarjei Vesaas.

In 2004, Nordstoga signed for Universal Records and made his definitive breakthrough with the album Luring, selling 150.000 copies and spending 14 weeks on top of the Norwegian album charts. The lead single from the album, about a howling pig entitled "Kveldssong for deg og meg", is already a Norwegian evergreen and one of the most played songs on Norwegian radio in 2004. "Texas", "Lause Ting", "Hallo Hallo" and "Farvel til deg" from the same album also became massive radio hits for Nordstoga.

The tour in the wake of the album, the so-called Luringtur tour, which Nordstoga played together with his backing band Daz Nordstogaz Allstars, played to a 60.000 strong crowd. At the Spellemannprisen Awards in February 2005, Nordstoga won two awards as he was named best male artist and Spellemann of the Year. In the summer of 2005, Nordstoga once again took to the road for the "Luringtur" MK II tour.

Nordstoga has also been involved in TV productions. In 2004 he did the music for the Norwegian children's series Linus i Svingen that was broadcast on NRK 1, Norway's public broadcaster. The theme song, "Svingensongen", is being released in 2005 on the compilation album Tidenes beste barneplate 2. He has also been involved with the music for Norway's vastly popular UHU! series.

In June 2005, Nordstoga teamed up with some of Norway's finest jazz musicians and performed the piece "Pilegrim" to great acclaim at Festspillene i Bergen (Bergen Music Festival). the lyrics were written by lyricists Stein Versto and Ragnar Hovland, both previously involved in the Luring production. In August 2005, he made a cameo appearance with Norwegian rap-collective Klovner i Kamp, singing the chorus to their single "Syng".

Odd Nordstoga has also done projects for 'The Salvation Army' and folk music projects with different people, amongst other things, renditions of the famous Telemark piece "Storegut" with brother Aasmund and Lars Underdal, and guest appearances with the band Fake It or Leave It who play Beatles songs Norwegian folk music style.

Nordstoga released his follow-up to Luring in October 2006. Entitled Heim Te Mor, the album received a great deal of airplay and acclaim from critics all over Norway. The radio single and title track "Heim Te Mor" became a radio hit upon release in September 2006, marking another milestone for Nordstoga as this release marks his first music video as a solo artist, an animated video based on a Nordstoga concert in his local community made by the Animidas film maker crew. With radio single number two "Frøken Franzen" coinciding with the album's release, Odd Nordstoga looks set for another album success. He is also responsible for the soundtrack to the forthcoming Christmas children series Jul i Svingen on Norway's NRK TV channel, which is the follow-up to Linus i Svingen.

Nordstoga released the songbook Songfuggel i Karmen in 2007, containing his greatest hits and his personal favourites. In 2008 the album Pilegrim was released to great acclaim, securing the third bestseller in a row for the artist. In the autumn of the same year Nordstoga, together with his brother Aasmund Nordstoga and fiddler Per Anders Buen Garnås, toured Norway with a revamped version of the Storegut performance.

== Strålande Jul and sales record ==
On 9 November 2009 Nordstoga released the album Strålande Jul together with Norwegian soprano Sissel Kyrkjebø. The album is a collection of Norwegian, Swedish and Danish Christmas songs. The album was issued under the moniker Sissel & Odd and accompanied by a series of concerts in Scandinavia. In an attempt to sell more records in the age of downloading the album was partly released through the grocery store chain Coop Norge whereby its members could buy the album at a reduced price. The gimmick paid off, securing a sale of over 100.000 copies in its first week of release alone, of which 60.000 were sold in Coop stores. With the album selling well in both Norway and Sweden, it was released in Denmark on 1 December 2009. It was revealed by the end of 2009 that this album was the best selling album of the 2000s in Norway, selling 400,000 copies.

== Controversy ==
In the autumn of 2006, Odd Nordstoga was the cause of a controversy between the Norwegian national broadcaster NRK, his management, Universal Records and the producers and cast of Norwegian-Swedish folk music adaptation of the Wolfgang Amadeus Mozart piece The Magic Flute (Tryllefløyten). Nordstoga, having played Papageno in the piece in the spring of 2006, withdrew from the plans to show the stage adaptation on NRK TV during Christmas 2006. According to Nordstoga's management and label, a screening of the play at this time would collide with Nordstoga's two album releases of 2006 and overexpose him. The result was a massive outburst from some of his contemporaries in the Norwegian folk music scene, most prominently the folk singer Kirsten Bråten Berg. In the media, Nordstoga was portrayed as the villain, letting his personal career interfere with the ensemble of which he was part. In later interviews, Nordstoga claims to have been very sad about the situation and felt trapped by his obligations toward his recording company.

== Crossover ==
Nordstoga has collaborated with leading Norwegian artists and musicians from a wide variety of genres including folk music, jazz, electronica, chanson, hip hop, rock, classical music and pop. In addition to this, Nordstoga has shown that he is a "jack-of-all-trades" within the cultural field having performed in and helped writing cabarets, opera, edited books and acted in a film.

== International career ==
Nordstoga is for the most part famous within Norway. However, together with Rikskonsertene, he carried out a tour of China in 2008. In concurrence with the release of the Christmas album Strålande Jul he toured Sweden as well as appearing on Norwegian-Swedish talkshow Skavlan. The album peaked at #17 in the Swedish Charts. The album will also be released in Denmark.

== Dialect ==
Being from Vinje in the traditional district of Vest-Telemark, Nordstoga writes and performs most of his original work in his native Telemark dialect. He also speaks the dialect privately and in the media. This has become a trademark for him and gained him respect from language organizations, as well as parodies and, to a small extent, ridicule from parts of the population without a distinct dialect. He was awarded the Telemark County Travel Industry Award for 2010 for using his dialect to promote the county of Telemark in a positive way.

== Discography ==
=== Albums ===
Year	Album title	Record label	Credited to	Peak position	
Year	Album title	Record label	Credited to	NOR	SWE
1997	Something Odd	Odd Productions	Something Odd	—	—
1998	Solreven	BMG Norway/RCA	Something Odd	—	—
2000	Nordstoga	Grappa Musikkforlag	Nordstoga	—	—
2001	Blåmann Blåmann	Heilo/Grappa Musikkforlag	Blåmann Blåmann	—	—
2002	Nivelkinn	Heilo/Grappa Musikkforlag	Øyonn Groven Myhren & Odd Nordstoga	—	—
2004	Luring	Sonet/Universal	Odd Nordstoga	1	—
2006	Heim Te Mor	Sonet/Universal	Odd Nordstoga	2	—
2008	Pilegrim	Sonet/Universal	Odd Nordstoga	2	—
2009	Strålande jul	Universal	Sissel & Odd	1	7
2010	November	Sonet/Universal	Odd Nordstoga	1	—
2011	Bestevenn	Sonet/Universal	Odd Nordstoga	1	—
2013	Heimafrå	Universal	Ingebjørg Bratland & Odd Nordstoga	2	—
2015	Dette landet	Universal	Odd Nordstoga	1	—
2016	Aleine heime	Universal	Odd Nordstoga	22	—
2018	Kløyvd	Universal	Odd Nordstoga	5	—
2022	Inn i skogen	Universal	Odd Nordstoga	12	—

=== Singles ===
Promotional singles

- 2005: "Syng" (Tuba) - (Klovner i Kamp feat. Odd Nordstoga)
- 2006: "Heim Te Mor"
- 2008: "Min Eigen Song"

Radio singles

- 1998: "Fuggel i Karmen" (as Something Odd)
- 1998: "Ingen eg kjenner" (as Something Odd)
- 2000: "Dag"
- 2000: "Bie på deg"
- 2001: "Tippe Tippe Tuve"
- 2002: "Uppi Måneskin" (with Øyonn Groven Myhren)
- 2002: "Guten og Folen" (with Øyonn Groven Myhren)
- 2003: "Eg & Edith" (with Herborg Kråkevik)
- 2004: "Lause Ting"
- 2004: "Hallo Hallo"
- 2004: "Farvel til deg"
- 2004: "Texas"
- 2004: "Kveldssong for deg og meg"
- 2004: "Svingensongen"
- 2006: "Frøken Franzen"
- 2009: "Upp gledjest alle, gledjest no" (as Sissel & Odd)
- 2010: "November"
- 2010: "Lykkeliten"
- 2011: "Bestevenn"
- 2011: "Ein farfar i livet"
- 2013: "Olav Olav" (with Ingebjørg Bratland)
- 2014: "Landet imot Nord" (with Ingebjørg Bratland)
- 2014: "Dette landet" (with Ingebjørg Bratland)

Music video

- 2006: Heim Te Mor - Odd Nordstoga

== Chart history ==
All of Odd Nordstoga's solo albums have charted highly in the Norwegian Top 40 Albums Chart. Luring stayed in the charts for 38 weeks in 2004-2005 and peaked at no. 1. "Heim te Mor" stayed in the charts for 19 weeks in 2006-2007 and peaked at no. 2. "Pilegrim" stayed in the charts for 17 weeks in 2008-2009 and peaked at no. 2. The album Strålande Jul marked Nordstoga's first international hit album, entering the Swedish Top 40 Charts at #37 in its first week., and peaking at #17 in its third week. In Norway, the same album entered at #2, selling 100.000 copies in its first week, eventually reaching #1 in its second week. His latest album November debuted at no. 1 on the Norwegian charts.

The soundtrack album for the NRK series Jul i Svingen, written in its entirety by Odd Nordstoga and John VInge, charted for 4 weeks in 2006, peaking at no. 22.

Nordstoga's single "Heim te Mor" spent 16 weeks on the Norwegian Top 20 Singles Chart in 2006-2007 peaking at no. 5. The single "Min Eigen Song" stayed in the charts for one week only in 2008, peaking at no. 19.

The album Eg & Edith by Herborg Kråkevik, of which Odd Nordstoga was a substantial contributor both as a musician and songwriter, stayed in the Norwegian charts for 7 weeks in 2002 and peaked at no. 21.

== Other projects ==
Soundtracks

- 2004: Linus i Svingen (soundtrack for NRK)
- 2006: Jul i Svingen (soundtrack for NRK)
- 2011: Vaffelhjarte (soundtrack for NRK)

Guest appearances

- 1999: Smak av himmel, spor av jord (charity album by various artists)
- 2002: Eg & Edith (album by Herborg Kråkevik)
- 2002: My Mother's Tears (album by Hillborg Romtveit)
- 2004: Stolpesko (charity album by various artists)
- 2004: Barske børnerim (for viderekomne voksne) (album by Bjarte Hjelmeland)
- 2004: New North (album by Karl Seglem)
- 2005: Ørnen tek ikkje unga (album by Klovner i Kamp)
- 2005: Last Days & Nights (album by Simone Larsen)
- 2005: Det beste fra Aftenlandet (album by Aftenlandet)
- 2006: Under The Surface (album by Marit Larsen)
- 2006: Venn (charity single by various artists)
- 2008: Eggensongar (album by Jørund Fluge Samuelsen)
- 2008: De beste fra UHU (soundtrack album to children's television by various artists)
- 2009: Ein Visefugg (album by Aasmund Nordstoga)

Rarities

- 2001: Blåmann Blåmann (limited edition interview disc issued by Rikskonsertene)

Stage productions

- 2002: Storegut (live production of poems by Aasmund O. Vinje performed by Aasmund Nordstoga, Odd Nordstoga & Lars Underdal)
- 2002: Kjærlighet er best på pinne (cabaret with Eduardo Andersen)
- 2002: Eg & Edith (cabaret with Herborg Kråkevik)
- 2002: Nivelkinn (piece composed especially for Telemarkfestivalen)
- 2005: Pilegrim (piece composed especially for the Bergen Music Festival)
- 2006: Tryllefløyten (folk music adaptation of Mozart's "The Magic Flute")
- 2006: Asbury Park (tribute concert for Bruce Springsteen at the Kongsberg Jazzfestival)
- 2008: Storegut (revised live production of poems by Aasmund O. Vinje performed by Aasmund Nordstoga, Odd Nordstoga & Per Anders Buen Garnås)

Film

- 1991: Det Rare (short film based on a short story by Tarjei Vesaas)

TV series

- 2011: Vaffelhjarte (NRK)

Books

- 2002: Song for deg og meg (edited by Odd Nordstoga)
- 2007: Sangbok (songbook by Kjetil Indregard and Odd Nordstoga)
- 2007: Songfuggel i karmen (songbook published by Det Norske Samlaget)

Audio books:

- 2007: Linus i Svingen og fotballkampen (Kjetil Indregard and Odd Nordstoga)

Fun facts

- Nordstoga competed in a norwegian computer game competition in 2013 and placed first. This took place in Bergen and the event was called "B-lan".

== Selected awards ==
- Norwegian Grammy for Best Folk Music Album in 2002 ("Nivelkinn").
- Norwegian Grammies for Best Male Artist and Artist of the Year in 2004.
- Rural Profile of the year 2004, voted by the readers of the newspaper Nationen.
- Prisen for god offentleg språkbruk 2004 (Award for excellent public use of the language)
- Vinje Kommunes Kulturpris 2004 (The Culture Award of Vinje Municipality).
- Folkemusikkprisen 2004 (The 2004 Folk Music Award)
- The Edvard Award (Edvardprisen) for his song "Bie på deg" from the "Nordstoga" album of 2000
- Storegutprisen 2010
- Telemark County Travel Industry Award for 2010

== Appearances ==
=== TV shows ===
Odd Nordstoga has appeared in, amongst others, these TV shows

- Odd Nordstoga - Live i Studio 2 (NRK)
- Skavlan (NRK/SVT)
- Nytt på nytt (NRK)
- Førkveld (NRK)
- Idol (TV2)
- Stereo (NRK 2)
- Senkveld med HC & Tommy (TV 2)
- Senkveld med Thomas og Harald (TV2)
- Absolutt Underholdning (TV 2)
- Absolutt Norsk (NRK 1)
- Beat for Beat (NRK 1)
- Frokost-TV (NRK 1)
- Jul fra Gamle Bergen Kirke (NRK 1)
- God Morgen, Norge! (TV 2)
- Sommeråpent (NRK 1)
- Nordic Music Awards Countdown (TV 2)
- Nordic Music Awards 2004 (TV 2)
- Redaksjon EN (NRK 1)
- SøndagsTabloid (TV 2)
- Magiske Understrenger-Historien om Hardingfela (NRK 1)
- Spellemannprisen 2002 (TV 2)
- Spellemannprisen 2004 (TV 2)
- TV-Aksjonen (NRK 1)
- Kvelden før Kvelden (NRK 1)
- Ein Luring frå Vinje (NRK 1)
- Jul i Blåfjell (NRK 1)
- Faktor (NRK 1)
- Frodes musikalske reise (TV 2)
- Den som ser fær sjå (Vest-Telemark Lokal TV)

=== Radio shows ===
Odd Nordstoga has appeared in, amongst others, these radio shows

- P1-scenen (NRK P1)
- Norsk på Norsk (NRK P1)
- Folkemusikktimen (NRK P2)
- P3-Morgen (NRK P3)
- JuleSessions (NRK P3)
- Sommer i P2 (NRK P2)

== See also ==
- Sissel & Odd

Awards
Preceded by Silje Nergaard	Recipient of the Spellemannprisen as This year's Spellemann; 2004	Succeeded by Madrugada
Preceded by Valkyrien Allstars	Recipient of the Traditional folk music Gammleng-prisen; 2013	Succeeded by Sigrid Moldestad
