= Baten =

Baten is a surname. Notable people with the surname include:

- A. S. M. A. Baten – Bangladeshi Admiral
- Heinrich Baten (fl. late 13th century), Belgian-German astronomer
- Jörg Baten (born 1965), German economic historian
- Md. Abdul Baten – Bangladeshi Police Officer
- Raymond Baten (born 1989), Aruban footballer

== Other meanings ==
- Baten Bahini – Militia during the Bangladesh Liberation War
- Baten Kaitos, or Zeta Ceti
  - Baten Kaitos: Eternal Wings and the Lost Ocean, role-playing video game (2003)
  - Baten Kaitos Origins, role-playing video game (2006)
- Båten om kvelden – Book by Tarjei Vesaas
- Chhoti Chhoti Baten – 1965 film directed by Motilal
