= Vårnatt (film) =

- Directed by: Erik Solbakken
- Written by: Erik Solbakken; Olav Dalgard (script consultant)
- Based on: a novel by Tarjei Vesaas
- Produced by: Harald Ohrvik; Svein H. Toreg; Lasse Glomm
- Starring: Espen Skjønberg; Astrid Folstad; Svein Scharffenberg; Bentein Baardson; Anders Mordal; Inger Marie Andersen
- Cinematography: Hans Nord
- Edited by: Edith Toreg
- Music by: Olav Anton Thommessen
- Distributed by: Norsk Film A/S
- Release date: 1976
- Running time: 95 minutes
- Country: Norway
- Language: Norwegian

Vårnatt (Spring Night) is a Norwegian film from 1976 directed by Erik Solbakken. Solbakken also wrote the script, which was based on Tarjei Vesaas's 1954 novel Spring Night. Olav Dalgard was the script consultant.

Vårnatt premiered on February 26, 1976.

== Plot ==
Hallstein and Sissel live together with their parents in a small village. One spring night they will be left alone at home for the first time while their parents are at a funeral in another village. There is a warm familiarity between them and they are looking forward to being at home. However, when they are about to eat supper, there is a knock on the door. A foreign family in need of help is standing outside. Their car has broken down, and a young woman with them is ready to give birth. They need room, beds, and a midwife. Eventually the unresolved conflicts between them lead to tension in the little house.

== Cast ==
- Espen Skjønberg as Hjalmar
- Astrid Folstad as Kristine
- Svein Scharffenberg as Karl
- Bentein Baardson as Tore
- Anders Mordal as Hallstein
- Inger Marie Andersen as the mother
- Bente Børsum as a night-shift nurse
- Wilfred Breistrand as the father
- Maryon Eilertsen as Sissel
- Veslemøy Haslund as a midwife
- Tania Kjeldset as Gudrun
- Kirsti Kolstad as Grete
- Arne Lie as an orderly
- Svein Moen as an orderly
- Kjell Stormoen as a doctor
