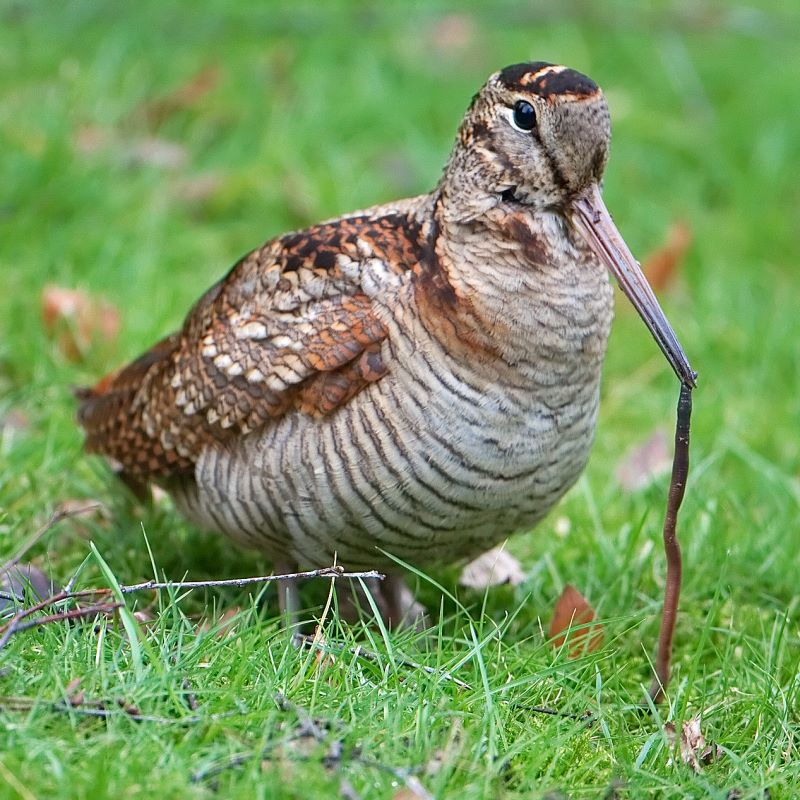

Conservation status
- Least Concern (IUCN 3.1)

Scientific classification
- Kingdom: Animalia
- Phylum: Chordata
- Class: Aves
- Order: Charadriiformes
- Family: Scolopacidae
- Genus: Scolopax
- Species: S. rusticola

Binomial name
- Scolopax rusticola Linnaeus, 1758
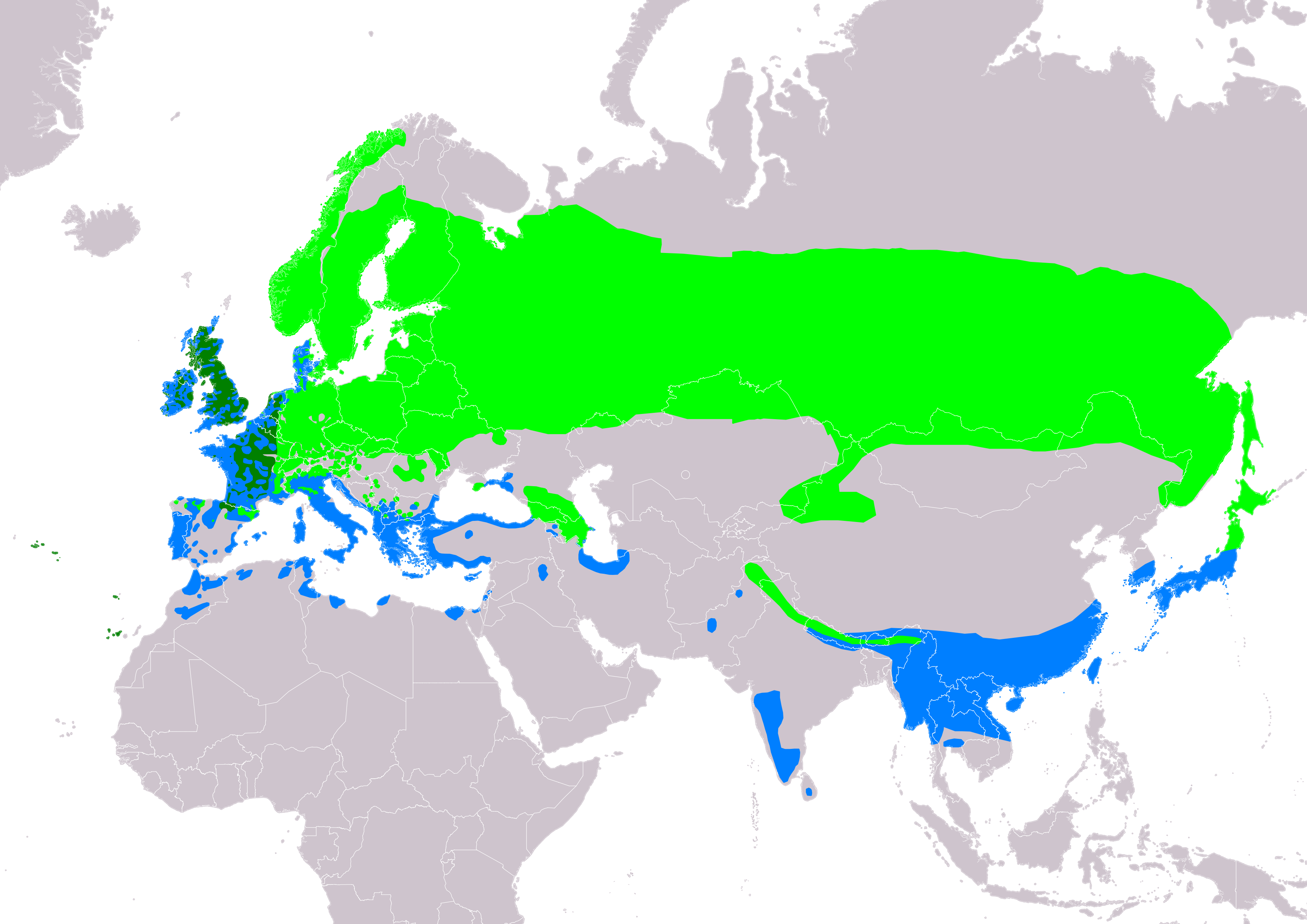
- Range of S. rusticola Breeding Resident Non-breeding

= Eurasian woodcock =

Species of bird

The Eurasian woodcock (Scolopax rusticola) is a medium-small wading bird found in temperate and subarctic Eurasia. It has cryptic camouflage to suit its woodland habitat, with reddish-brown upperparts and buff-coloured underparts. Its eyes are set far back on its head to give it 360-degree vision and it probes in the ground for food with its long, sensitive bill, making it vulnerable to cold weather when the ground remains frozen.

The male performs a courtship flight known as "roding" at dusk in spring. It is widely believed that the female will sometimes carry chicks between her legs whilst flying, though evidence of this is purely anecdotal. The world population is estimated to be 14 million to 16 million birds.

== Taxonomy ==
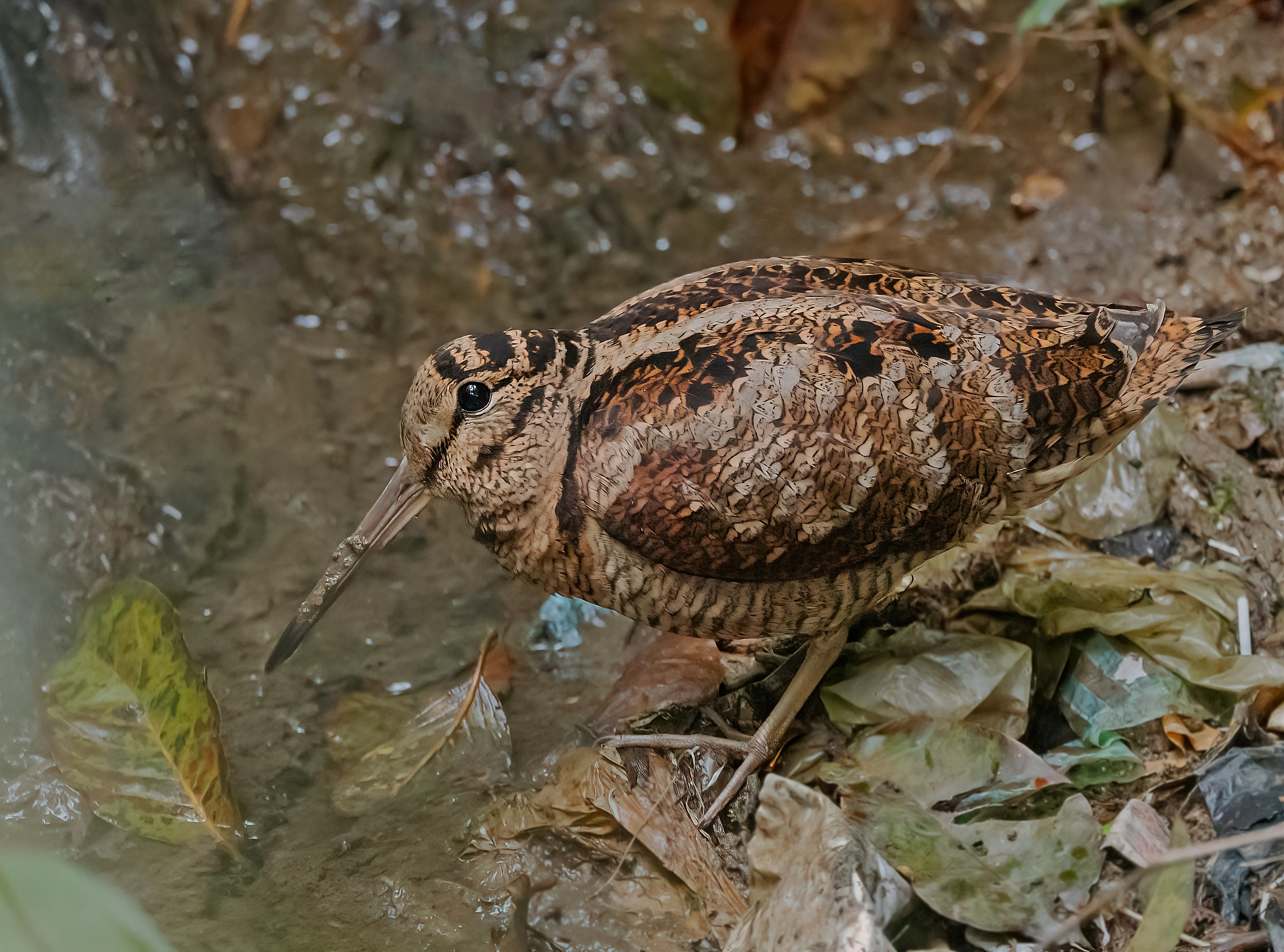
Eurasian Woodcock, Mangpoo, Darjeeling, West Bengal

The Eurasian woodcock was formally described by the Swedish naturalist Carl Linnaeus in 1758 in the tenth edition of his Systema Naturae under the current binomial name Scolopax rusticola. The genus name is Latin for a snipe or woodcock. The specific epithet rusticola is the Latin name of a gamebird mentioned by Pliny the Elder and Marcus Valerius Martialis. It was possibly a grouse. The species is monotypic: no subspecies are recognised. Its closest relatives are the other woodcocks in the genus Scolopax.

== Description ==
Adults are 33–38 cm (13–15 in) in length, including the 6–8 cm (2.4–3.1 in) long straight bill, and have a 55–65 cm (22–26 in) wingspan. The Eurasian woodcock has cryptic camouflage to suit its woodland habitat, with intricately patterned reddish-brown upperparts and buff underparts. The head is barred with black, not striped like that of its close relatives, the snipe. It has large eyes located high on the sides of its head, giving it 360-degree monocular vision.

The wings are rounded and the base of the bill is flesh-coloured with a dark tip. The legs vary from grey to pinkish. The species is sexually dimorphic, with the male much larger than the female, although the sexes cannot be separated in the field.

== Distribution and habitat ==
About one third of the world's Eurasian woodcock breed in Europe, with more than 90% of the continent's population breeding in Russia and Fennoscandia. Their breeding range stretches from Fennoscandia to the Mediterranean Sea and Canary Islands and from western Europe to Russia. The population on the Azores is isolated from mainland Europe, resulting in subtle genetic differentiation.

This species is the woodcock found through most of temperate and subarctic Eurasia. Northern and Asian populations migrate to southern Europe or the Indian subcontinent, respectively. Birds in milder western European countries and on Atlantic islands are resident. The populations breeding in north-west and southern Europe are mostly sedentary. The birds' spring migration commences in February; breeding territories are reached between March and May. Spring migration movements of woodcock are influenced by weather conditions, however this does not have a major effect on their subsequent breeding success.

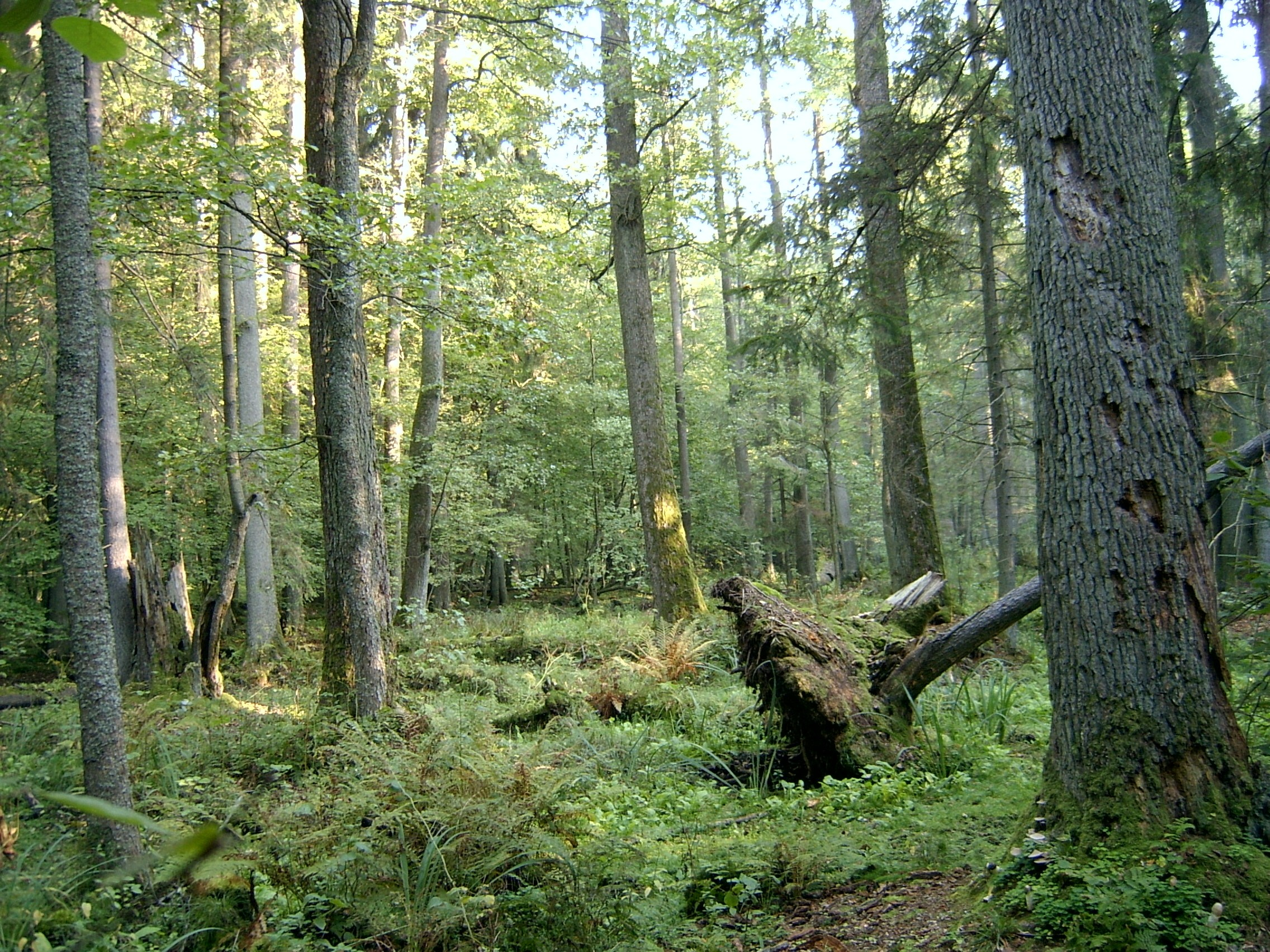
Habitat: Białowieża National Park, Poland

The Eurasian woodcock has a large range, with an estimated Global Extent of Occurrence of 10 million square kilometres and a population of an estimated 15 million to 16 million birds. Because of its large range, stable population trend and large population size, the species has been evaluated as Least Concern. The most important threat to the population of the Eurasian woodcock in the breeding range is the increased fragmentation of its woodland habitat. At other times of year, a reduction in the amount of permanent grassland and an increase in the intensification of farming are also threats, and the species' susceptibility to avian influenza may have an impact in future.

The Eurasian woodcock's required breeding habitat is large, unfragmented areas of broadleaved deciduous or mixed broadleaved and coniferous forest, with dense undergrowth of plants such as brambles, holly, hazel, gorse, bracken, or bilberry. On a small scale, Eurasian woodcock appear to prefer woods containing birch and are less likely to be found in beech dominated woods. They also prefer woods further away from urban areas. Breeding territories must include a mix of dry, warm resting places, damp areas for feeding, and clearings for flight. In larger woods, wide "rides" (open tracks through the wood) and small clearings are important. In winter, Eurasian woodcock also use scrubland during the day but in freezing weather they may use intertidal mud.

== Behaviour ==
Eurasian woodcock are crepuscular (most active at dawn and dusk) and rarely active during the day unless flushed, when they fly off with a whirring wing noise. The flight is somewhat owl- or bat-like; woodcock fly fast and directly while migrating or crossing open country, but fly erratically with twisting and fluttering once in woodland. They are usually solitary and migrate singly, but may congregate when weather or geographical conditions force them to do so. This species is parasitised by the moorhen flea, Dasypsyllus gallinulae.

=== Breeding ===
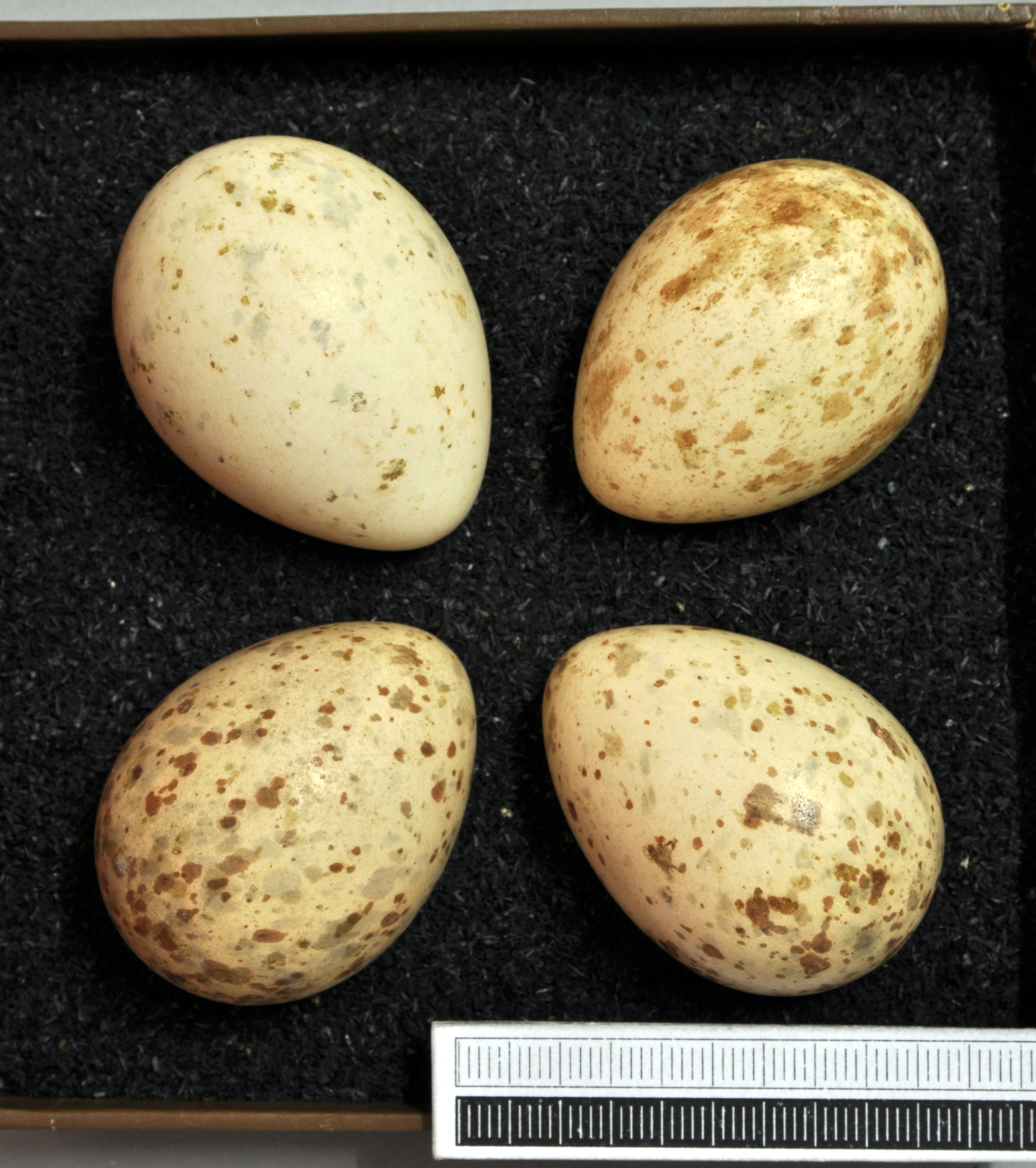
Eggs, Collection Museum Wiesbaden, Germany

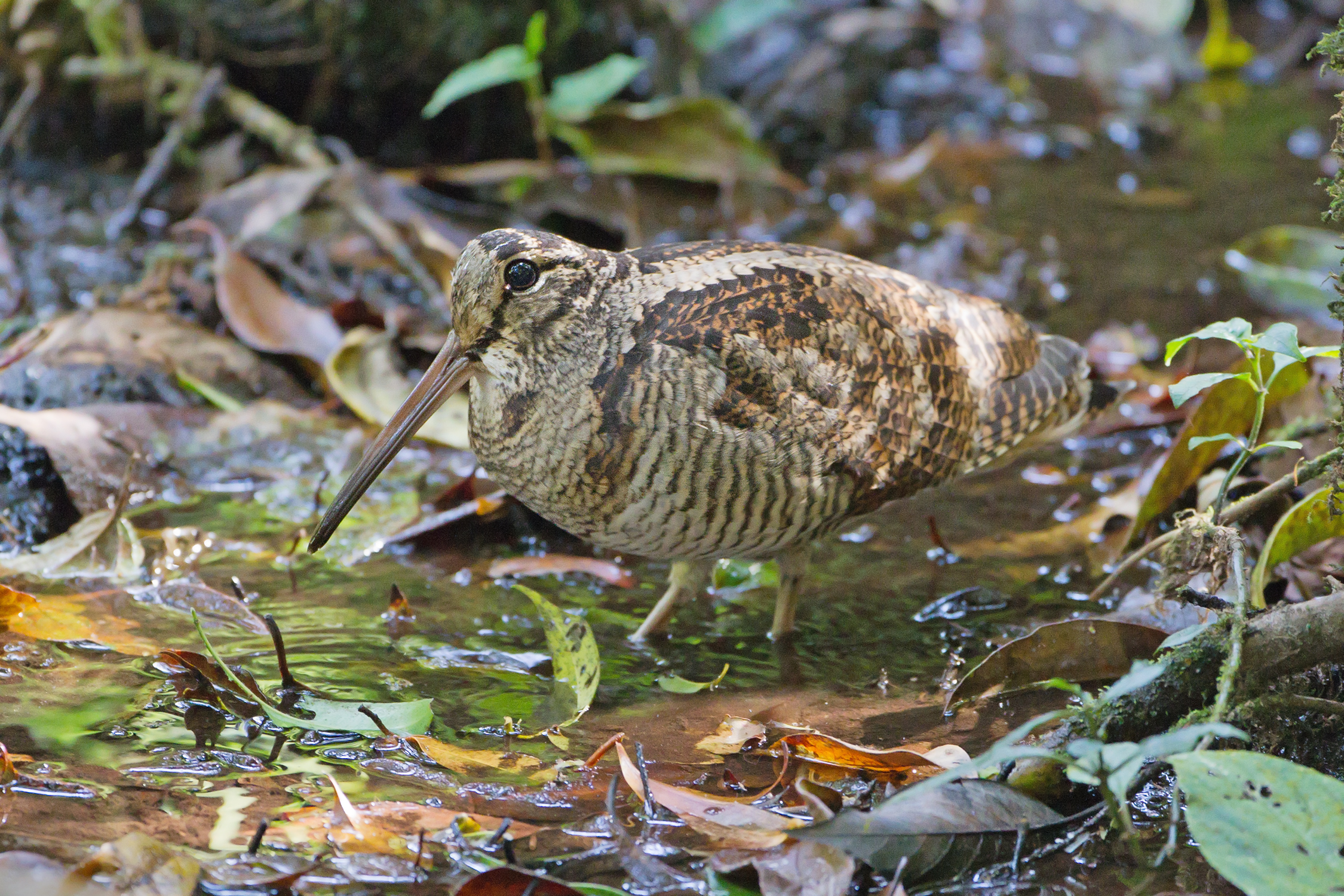
Eurasian woodcock at Doi Inthanon National Park, Chiang Mai, Thailand

The male performs a courtship display flight called 'roding' at dusk between April and June. A mating call is performed during courtship display flights: orr, orr, orr, pist. A study of spectrograms of the vocalisations of male Eurasian woodcock showed that 95% of calls could be attributed correctly to individual birds, and concluded that counting roding males was a suitable method of monitoring the population. Roding surveys are now used for population estimates in a range of countries including Britain, Switzerland, France and Russia.

Eurasian woodcock nest on the ground in low cover in woodland or tall heather. The nest is a lined cup or a slight hollow lined with dead leaves and other plant material. A single brood of one or two white or creamy eggs with light brown and grey blotches is laid; once the clutch is complete, incubation is performed by the female for between 21 and 24 days. The eggs measure 44 mm × 34 mm (1.7 in × 1.3 in) and weigh 26.5 g (7/8 oz), of which 5% is shell. The downy, precocial young leave the nest immediately and fledge after 15–20 days, although they can fly short distances after 10 days. When threatened, the mother bird can fly whilst carrying small chicks between her legs, body and tail, in her claws or on her back. This behaviour is rarely witnessed.

=== Food and feeding ===
Eurasian woodcock forage in soft soil in thickets, usually well hidden from sight. They mainly eat earthworms, but also insects and their larvae, freshwater molluscs and some plant seeds. Because they rely on probing into the ground to find food, they are vulnerable to cold winter weather when the ground remains frozen. During the cold British winter of 1962–63, starving woodcock were found feeding in urban areas and some were even forced to eat bird seed.

Nocturnal feeding occurs in frost-free pasture or long-rotation grass meadows; fields with woodland within 1 km (0.62 mi) are preferred to allow roosting during the day. There are only low densities of Eurasian woodcock in predominantly arable areas. In a three-year scientific study based in Brittany, France, 65 radio-tagged woodcock and their habitat preferences were monitored. During the day, the birds chose areas of forest with humus which held large numbers of earthworms and with a dense scrub layer to provide protection, and hedges with scrub and trees were also found to be important. At night, the woodcock selected grazed pastures which had five times the biomass of earthworms compared to tilled land.

== Relationship to humans ==
=== Hunting ===
In many countries woodcock are hunted as game, and their size, speed, and flight pattern makes them a very challenging shot. Anyone shooting a witnessed "right and left"—in which two woodcock are killed with consecutive shots from a shotgun, without the gun being lowered or reloaded—can be admitted to the Shooting Times Woodcock Club.

In 1821 William Bingley described a method of trapping Eurasian woodcock formerly used in northern England: "Long parallel rows of stones or stick, four or five inches high, were made in moonlight nights on the commons frequented by them. In these rows several intervals or gateways were left in which the traps were placed. When the birds, running about in search of food, came to one of these rows, they did not usually cross it, but ran along the side till they arrived at the gateways, which they entered, and in which they were caught."

The effect of hunting on the species' European breeding population is "little understood". A study conducted in Brittany, France, explored the factors affecting the populations of wintering Eurasian woodcock. The mortality and survival rates of 98 radio-tagged birds were monitored in a hunted area and in an adjoining hunting-free reserve. The scientists found rates of survival of 0.86 for adults and 0.67 for juveniles, with the probability of survival increasing as birds spent more time in the reserve. Matrix population models were used and the conclusion was that "such low survival probabilities cannot sustain long-term viable populations. These results call for caution in the harvesting of woodcock populations wintering in western France and could be a forewarning of a decline."

In the United Kingdom, surveys are being conducted to improve knowledge of the number of breeding Eurasian woodcock and the structure of their habitat. Isotope analysis of feathers from Eurasian woodcock shot in the UK is also being performed to establish the origins of the birds.

=== Gastronomy ===
Eurasian woodcock are considered at their best for culinary purposes from October to December. After shooting, the birds are hung for 4–8 days to tenderise; the meat can be eaten as a starter, savoury, or for breakfast. A bird serves one person. They are not gutted before cooking; the head, skinned with eyes removed, is left on and the beak used to truss the bird.

A recipe for roast woodcock was featured in Mrs Beeton's Book of Household Management, but despite its name, the Victorian dish named Scotch woodcock consists of scrambled eggs on toast with anchovies.

Bingley wrote that (in the United Kingdom) "Few birds are so much in esteem for the table as these", although he also reported that woodcock meat was not eaten in Sweden or Norway as it was thought unwholesome, but that the eggs were taken and sold in "great numbers" in Stockholm and Gothenburg. In Nicolas Freeling's Kitchen Book he narrates the lavish dinner described in Kipling's Sea Constables, which features woodcock as a savoury, and explains that 'the woodcock has no gall, and is not cleaned [...] the creamy inside parts are spread on toast [...] no Edwardian gentleman would have resisted this for one minute.'

=== Folklore and culture ===
In the United Kingdom, the early arrival of migrant woodcock in autumn was said to mean a good harvest, especially if they stayed until spring. It used to be thought that Eurasian woodcock flew to the moon during the months when they were not seen and the first full moon in November, when large numbers arrive on the British coast, is sometimes described as the 'woodcock moon'.

Reaney and Wilson wrote that the English surname "Woodcock" developed as a nickname from the bird, meaning 'a fool, simpleton or dupe'.

In William Shakespeare's play Love's Labours Lost, Berowne describes himself and his friends as 'four woodcocks in a dish', after discovering they have all fallen in love when they have sworn not to. An old folk name for the goldcrest was the "woodcock pilot" because of the mistaken belief that goldcrests rode in the feathers of migrating woodcock. In Hamlet, Polonius refers to Hamlet's vows as "springes to catch woodcocks".

The 'pin feather' of the Eurasian woodcock (the covert feather of the outermost primary) can be used as a fine paintbrush for miniatures, or as a delicate tool for moving tiny objects (e.g. specks of dust). As a painting tool, the feather has been described as "far from ideal, holding very little paint, resisting water and wearing down quickly at the tip." The Eurasian woodcock has been the subject of postage stamps from several countries.

A woodcock serves as a symbolic element in the novel The Birds by writer Tarjei Vesaas.
