= Nordstoga =

Nordstoga is a Norwegian surname. Notable people with the surname include:

- Aasmund Nordstoga (born 1964), Norwegian musician, singer, and composer
- Kåre Nordstoga (born 1954), Norwegian organist
- Odd Nordstoga (born 1972), Norwegian singer, musician, actor, and editor
