= Aasmund Nordstoga =

Norwegian musician, singer and composer

Aasmund Nordstoga (born 26 August 1964) is a Norwegian musician, singer and composer from Vinje Municipality in Telemark county. He made his solo debut in 2009 with the album Ein visefugg, an album for which he was nominated for the Spellemannsprisen award. He released the record Livet er godt with lyrics by Aasmund Olavsson Vinje being a collaboration with his younger brother, Odd Nordstoga,

Aasmund Nordstoga comes from a musical family. His mother, Ellen is a folk singer and his father, Olav Nordstoga is a folk singer, lyricist, and causer. He is also related to Kåre Nordstoga, a musician from Notodden Municipality.

He received the Nynorsk User of the Year award in 2014.

== Discography ==
=== Albums ===
Year	Album	Peak positions	Certification
Year	Album	NOR	Certification
2009	Ein visefugg	5	
2010	Friaren	10	
2011	Tolv dagar i jola	34	
2013	Guten – songar av Aasmund Olavsson Vinje	29	
2015	Sæle Jolekveld (with Gunnhild Sundli)	38	
