= Kimen =

- Directed by: Erik Solbakken
- Written by: Erik Solbakken
- Based on: Tarjei Vesaas's 1940 novel The Seed
- Starring: Kjell Stormoen; Svein Sturla Hungnes; Ragnhild Michelsen; Helle Ottesen; Helge Jordal
- Cinematography: Hans Nord
- Edited by: Edith Toreg
- Music by: Kåre Kolberg
- Distributed by: Norsk Film
- Release date: February 28, 1974
- Running time: 93 minutes
- Country: Norway
- Language: Norwegian

Kimen (The Seed) is a Norwegian film from 1974 directed by Erik Solbakken. It starred Kjell Stormoen, Svein Sturla Hungnes, Ragnhild Michelsen, Helle Ottesen, Helge Jordal, and Ragnhild Hilt. The film was based on the 1940 novel of the same name by Tarjei Vesaas.

== Plot ==
Some people are living on a green island in the ocean to the west. In this simple and earthy environment, they live in harmony with each other. It seems to be a small community in balance. However, when a mentally unstable stranger comes to the island, this balance is suddenly destroyed. The stranger causes a young girl's death, and the death has a strong impact on the island community. Fear and mass hysteria affect the population.

The drama in the film highlights themes such as crowd psychology and an individual's responsibility for collective misdeeds.

== Reception ==
When it was released, the film received good reviews from Gunvor Gjessing at Aftenposten and Bjørn Granum at Arbeiderbladet. Among other things, Gjessing wrote that "The film's most striking feature is that has a clear plot that is easy to grasp. It ought to appeal to many because here there is quite a lot to think about: outbreaks of hidden destructive forces, mass hysteria, herd behavior, and individual responsibility." Among other things, Granum wrote that "We've got a promising new filmmaker in Norway. After several years of short films, Solbakken has come out in full bloom with his feature film debut."

Kimen received a "die throw" of three from Dagbladet in 2003.

== Cast ==
- Kjell Stormoen: Karl Li
- Svein Sturla Hungnes: Rolv Li
- Ragnhild Michelsen: Mari Li
- Helle Ottesen: Inga Li
- Helge Jordal: Andreas Vest
- Ragnhild Hilt: Else
- Urda Arneberg: Kari Nes
- Arne Lie: Dal
- Tom Tellefsen: Haug
- Anne Marie Ottersen: Gudrun
- Roy Bjørnstad: Jens
- Sigrun Enge: Gunhild
- Ragnar Holen: carriage driver
- Annerut Joner: Helga
- Ilse Kramm: Ragnhild
- Kaare Kroppan: first farmer
- Alf Nordvang: blacksmith
- Ivar Nørve: Ivar
- Edith Ottosen: Åshild
- Øyvind Øyen: first settler
- Hallbjørn Rønning: second farmer
- Ole A. Simensen: second settler
- Gunnar Simenstad: third farmer
- Erik Svendsen: fourth farmer
- Liv Thorsen: Bergit
