= The House in the Dark =

1945 novel by Tarjei Vesaas

First UK edition (publ. Peter Owen, 1976)

The House in the Dark (Nynorsk: Huset i mørkret) is a 1945 novel by the Norwegian writer Tarjei Vesaas. It tells the story of a frightening, darkened house, to which men are trying to dig tunnels, but are routinely captured and taken away in a truck. The novel was written during the last winter of World War II and is an allegory for the German occupation of Norway. An English translation by Elizabeth Rokkan was published in 1976.

The book was awarded the Melsom Prize.
