= Åsfrid Svensen =

Norwegian literary historian (1936–2026)

Åsfrid Svensen (21 May 1936 – 9 May 2026) was a Norwegian literary historian and a professor of Nordic literature at the University of Oslo. She has published a number of books, on Arne Garborg and Olav Duun, among others. She was also a member of the Norwegian Academy of Science and Letters. In 2001 she received the NBU-prisen. Svensen died on 9 May 2026, at the age of 89.
