= Nynorsk User of the Year =

Annual Norwegian language prize

Nynorsk User of the Year (Norwegian: Årets nynorskbrukar) is a prize awarded by the Nynorsk Cultural Center at the Nynorsk Festival every year. The prize is awarded to the "persons or institutions that demonstrate the ability to break language and cultural conventions on the use of Nynorsk, which through their example or practical work make it easier to be Nynorsk users, or which create a greater general understanding of Nynorsk." Since 2006, the prize has consisted of NOK 50,000 and a graphic print, and on two occasions a copy of the game Dialektspelet. In 2014, the prize was NOK 100,000, split equally between the two prize recipients. The competition is headed by the Nynorsk Cultural Center, which also serves as the jury.

== Prizewinners ==
- 2000: Karl Arne Utgård
- 2001: Gerd Kjellaug Berge
- 2002: Ringstabekk School, Bærum
- 2003: Martin Toft
- 2004: Side Brok
- 2005: Kjartan Fløgstad
- 2006: Kari Traa
- 2007: Guri Vesaas
- 2008: Åmliavisa
- 2009: Ottar Rekkedal
- 2010: Maria Parr
- 2011: Linda Sæbø
- 2012: Ingvild Bryn and Arill Riise
- 2013: Gunnar Skirbekk
- 2014: Aasmund Nordstoga and Odd Nordstoga
- 2015: Jorunn Veiteberg
- 2016: Martine Rørstad Sand
- 2017: Morten Haga Lunde
- 2018: John-Ragnar Aarset
- 2019: Floke and Balanzera (Hairdressing chains)
- 2020: Geir Sverre Braut
- 2021: Bergen municipality, represented by the mayor Marte Mjøs Persen
