= Gunnar Skirbekk =

Norwegian philosopher

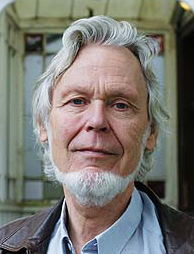
- Born: April 11, 1937 (age 89)

Gunnar Skirbekk (born 11 April 1937) is a Norwegian philosopher. He is professor emeritus at the Department of Philosophy and the Center for the Study of the Sciences and the Humanities, University of Bergen. He is a member of the Norwegian Academy of Science and Letters and the Royal Norwegian Society of Sciences and Letters.

== Academic career ==
Skirbekk studied at the University of Oslo 1957–59, in Paris 1960–61, and in Tübingen 1961–62. He was later a research assistant for Herbert Marcuse and Avrum Stroll at the University of California, San Diego (UCSD) 1966–67; dr.philos. at the University of Bergen in 1970; research at UCSD 1979–80, 1983, and 1991.

He became an assistant teacher at the Department of Philosophy at the University of Bergen 1962. He was made associate professor in 1964, and then professor in the philosophy of the sciences and the humanities in 1979. He was made Professeur invité at the University of Nice in Spring 1997. In the Winter 2000–2001 he was Professor at the department of philosophy of Freie Universität Berlin. He was Advisory Professor at East China Normal University from 1998, and Fellow (Kurator) at the Hans Jonas Zentrum in Berlin from 1998. Founder of the Center for the Study of the Sciences and the Humanities (established 1987) at the University of Bergen, and director from 1987 to 1991, 1995–1997, and 2001–2003.

He received the Lauritz Meltzer Award for most outstanding research at the University of Bergen in the period 1990–1996. The Tønnes Andenæs Award, together with Nils Gilje, for Filosofihistorie 1–2 (A History of Western Thought), in 1999. He is translated into more than 20 languages. In 2013 he received the Nynorsk User of the Year award.

== Editorial and group positions ==
- Co-editor of Norsk filosofisk tidsskrift (Norwegian Philosophical Journal) 1979–1983
- Member of the editorial board of Praxis International 1980–1993, and of Social Science Studies 1988–1994
- Member of the Overseas Correspondence Board of Chinese Social Sciences Quarterly from 1994
- Member of the editorial board of Redescriptions, Yearbook of Political Thought and Conceptual History from 2004.
- Together with Jürgen Habermas, Hilary Putnam (died 2016) and Patrick Suppes (died 2014), member of the advisory board of Philosophical Analysis (Shanghai) from 2010.
- Member of the board of Nordic institute of philosophy from 1981 to 1998.
- Member of the board of the Norwegian Research Council (Norges almenvitenskapelige forskningsråd) 198–89.
- Member of the governmental Commission for the Freedom of Expression, 1996–1999.
- Norwegian coordinator of "Marco Polo" 1994–2005, a program of comparative studies of cultural modernization in Europe and East Asia, established in 1994, at the University of Bergen and East China Normal University in Shanghai.
- Member of the scientific committee of Noèsis from 2015.
- Member of the international editorial board of Danish Yearbook of Philosophy from 2019.

== Publications ==
- Nihilisme?, Oslo 1958 (third ed. 1998; Engl. ed. 1972, second ed. 1998). ISBN 978-8271300005
- Dei filosofiske vilkår for sanning. Ei tolking av Martin Heideggers sanningslære (The Philosophical Preconditions for Truth. An Interpretation of Martin Heidegger's Theory of Truth), Oslo 1966 (second ed. Bergen 1999: Om sanninga sitt vesen).
- Er ideologiane døde? (Are Ideologies Dead?), ed. and co-author, Oslo 1969.
- Nymarxisme og kritisk dialektikk (Neomarxism and Critical Dialectics), Oslo 1970.
- Truth and Preconditions, Bergen 1970.
- Innføring i politisk teori (Introduction to Political Theory], Bergen 1970.
- Politisk filosofi (Political Philosophy), revised version of Innføring i politisk teori, Bergen 1972, 2nd ed. 1976.
- Økologi og filosofi (Ecology and Philosophy), Oslo 1972.
- Wahrheitstheorien: Eine Auswahl aus den Diskussionen über Wahrheit im 20. Jahrhundert , Frankfurt a. M. 1977, ed. and co-author. ISBN 978-3518078105
- Filosofihistorie (History of Philosophy), Bergen/Oslo 1980, revised version of Politisk filosofi. New editions 1987, 1992, 1996, 2000 and 2007. From 1987, together with Nils Gilje; 2007 also with Anne Granberg, Cathrine Holst, and Rasmus Slaattelid. German edition 1993; Danish and Swedish editions 1995; Bokmål 1996; Icelandic edition 1999; Russian 2000; English 2001; Uzbek 2002 (new preface); Chinese 2004 (new postscript by Shijun Tong, revised and extended Chinese edition 2016); Tajik 2004 (new preface); Turkish 2004; Azeri and French (new preface by Jean-Luc Gautero) 2010; Arabic (new preface) 2012; Korean 2016; Serbian 2017; Persian 2023.
- Praxeology: An Anthology. Oslo, 1983, ed. and co-author. ISBN 978-8200066590
- Ord: Essay i utval, Oslo 1984. ISBN 978-8252123746
- Manuscripts on Rationality, Bergen, 1984; revised and enlarged version Bergen 1992.
- Objektivitetsproblemet i vitskapane (Problem of Objectivity in Science), Bergen 1984, ed. and co-author.
- Die pragmatische Wende. Sprachspielpragmatik oder Transzendentalpragmatik?, Frankfurt a. M. 1986, eds. Dietrich Böhler, Tore Nordenstam, Gunnar Skirbekk; co-author.
- Til Djevelens forsvar og andre essays (In Defence of the Devil, and other essays), Bergen 1987.
- Die pragmatische Wende, Frankfurt a. M., 1987, co-ed. and co-author.
- Modernitet - rasjonalisering og differensiering (Modernity - Rationalization and Differentiation), Bergen 1988, ed. and co-author.
- Vernunft und Verantwortung, Bergen 1992. ISBN 978-8290477290
- Kulturell modernitet, vitskapleg rasjonalitet (Cultural Modernity and Scientific Rationality), Bergen, 1992. ISBN 978-8290477283
- Eco-philosophical Manuscripts, Bergen 1992. ISBN 978-8290477276
- The Commercial Ark. A Book on Ecology, Evolution and Ethics, co-ed. and co-author, Oslo 1992.
- Geschichte der Philosophie, Frankfurt a. M. 1993, together with Nils Gilje.
- Rationalité et Modernité, Paris 1993.
- Rationality and Modernity: Essays in Philosophical Pragmatics, Oslo/Oxford 1993. ISBN 978-8200217183
- The Notion of Sustainability, Oslo 1994, co-ed. and co-author.
- Philosophy Beyond Borders. An Anthology of Norwegian Philosophy, co-ed. and co-author, Bergen 1997; Chinese edition 1999, extended Chinese edition 2016.
- Vit og vitskap. Postmodernistisk ord-bok om modernitetens babelske forvirring (Wisdom and science. Postmodernist word-book on the great confusion of modernity), Bergen 1998.
- Une praxéologie de la modernité. Universalité et contextualité de la raison discursive, Paris 1999.
- Øko-etikk (Eco-Ethics), Bergen 1999.
- Føresetnader for ein god politisk kultur (Preconditions for a good political culture), Oslo, 2000.
- A History of Western Thought, co-written with Nils Gilje, London 2001. ISBN 978-0415220736
- Modernitetens makt og avmakt. Vitskapsteoretiske perspektiv på kunnskap og makt, Oslo 2002.
- On Pragmatics – Contributions to Current Debates, ed. and co-author, Bergen 2002.
- Undringa (Wonder), philosophical essays, Oslo 2002.
- Praxeologie der Moderne, Weilerswist 2002.
- Reflexion und Verantwortung. Auseinadersetzungen mit Karl-Otto Apel (Festschrift), eds. Dietrich Böhler, Matthias Kettner, Gunnar Skirbekk; co-author, Frankfurt a. M. 2003.
- Striden om sanningen (The Fight over Truth), ed., Gothenburg 2004.
- Den filosofiske uroa (The philosophical restlessness), Oslo 2005.
- Religion, Modernity, and Rationality, Bergen, 2006.
- Ludvig Holberg. Dobbeltmonarkiets kulturelle modernisator, Bergen 2006.
- Timely Thoughts, Lanham 2007; in Chinese, Shi Dai Zhi Si, Shanghai 2010. ISBN 978-0761837763
- Rasjonalitet og modernitet, Oslo 2009.
- Une histoire de la philosophie occidentale, together with Nils Gilje, Paris 2010.
- Norsk og moderne, Oslo 2010.
- Multiple Modernities. A Tale of Scandinavian Experiences, Hong Kong 2011; in Chinese 2013. ISBN 978-9629964870
- Herausforderungen der Moderne aus wissenschaftsphilosophischer Sicht, Berlin 2012.
- "if a lion could talk..." ("om ei løve kunne tale ..."), with Rasmus Slaattelid, illustrated by Ingri Egeberg, Bergen 2012.
- Notes in retrospect, Bergen 2013; in Chinese 2013.
- Krise og medansvar (Crisis and co-responsibility), Oslo 2016.
- Norvezhskiy mentalitet i modernost, Moscow 2017 (Russian translation of Norsk og moderne).
- Philosophie der Moderne. Vernunft, Wahrheit, Menschenwürde, Meinungsfreiheit, Weilerswist 2017.
- Three Lectures, Bergen 2018.
- Epistemic Challenges in a Modern World. From "fake news" and "post truth" to underlying epistemic challenges in science-based risk-societies, Zürich 2019 (ISBN 9783643911711)
- Religion i moderne samfunn, Oslo 2021 (ISBN 9788282655934).
- Religion in modern societies, London 2023 (ISBN 978-1-032-57922-1).
