= Spring Night =

1954 Norwegian novel

- First English-language publication
- Author: Tarjei Vesaas
- Translator: Kenneth G. Chapman
- Publisher: Gyldendal Norsk Forlag
- Publication date: 1954
- English publication date: 1964, The American-Scandinavian Foundation
- Pages: 226

Spring Night (Nynorsk: Vårnatt) is a 1954 novel by the Norwegian writer Tarjei Vesaas. It tells the story of two siblings who for the first time spend a night without their parents, and are visited by strangers who ask for room for the night. An English translation by Kenneth G. Chapman was published in 1964, in a shared volume with Vesaas' novel The Seed.

Spring Night was the basis for a 1976 film with the same title, directed by Erik Solbakken.
