= NBU-prisen =

Norwegian youth literature award

NBU-prisen is a prize which is awarded by the Norwegian Writers for Children to a person or institution who had produced award-winning work in children's or youth literature in Norway. It is awarded every year to a Norwegian author or organization. The actual prize is a work of art, typically created by an illustrator of children’s books.

== Prize winners ==
- 1988: Anne-Marie Hole Borgen
- 1989: Norsk Forfattersentrum
- 1990: Literature Project in Telemark
- 1991: Else Ditlevsen
- 1992: Wenche Blomberg
- 1993: Kåre Kverndokken
- 1994: Director Karin Beate Vold (Norsk Barnebokinstitutt, the Norwegian Institute for Children’s Books)
- 1995: Hå Municipality
- 1996: Children's book editors Guri Vesaas (Samlaget) and Øyunn Krokann (of Gyldendal Tiden)
- 1997: Leikny Haga Indergaard
- 1988: Harald Bache-Wiig (University of Oslo)
- 1999: Barnetimen for de minste (NRK)
- 2000: Bookseller Lars-Erik Hanssen (of Fortuna Bokhandel)
- 2001: Author Anette Diesen
- 2002: Editor Irja Thorenfeldt (Aschehoug) and professor Åsfrid Svensen (of University of Oslo)
- 2003: Bookseller Kari Johanne Samuelsen and reviewer Ola By Rise (of Adresseavisen)
- 2004: Cultural editors at Hamar Arbeiderblad and Oppland Arbeiderblad for their book reviews
- 2005: Children's book editor Wenche Larsen (of Cappelen) and Anne Horn (of Omnipax)
- 2006: Children's librarian at Norwegian Library of Talking Books and Braille, Eli Frisvold and NRK's children's and youth editor
- 2007: School librarians Øystein Norvoll of Tromsø and Sigrunn Instefjord of Odda
- 2008: Jean-Baptiste Coursaud and Gabriele Haefs
- 2009: Former editor at Cappelen, Tori Hofmo, and editor at Cappelen Damm, Ellen Seip
- 2010: Pegasus, children's program at the Norwegian Literature Festival in Lillehammer
- 2011: Barnebokkritikk.no – the webpage specialises in reviewing and reporting on literature and performing arts for children and youth
- 2012: Falturiltu, Nynorsk book festival for children and youth
- 2013: Foreningen !les – the leading provider of literature for children and adolescents in Norway
- 2014: Children's book editor Marianne Koch Knudsen (Gyldendal)
- 2015: Writing studies in children’s and young adult literature at Norsk Barnebokinstitutt (NBI) and Dag Larsen
- 2016: Ubok.no
- 2017: Leser søker bok
- 2018: Arne Svingen
- 2019: Spangereid school library
