= Wenche Blomberg =

Norwegian author (1943–2023)

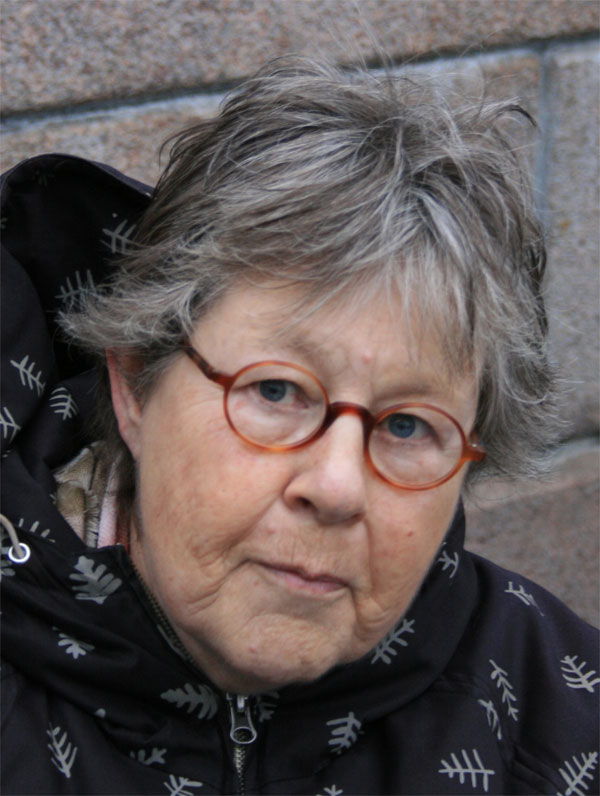
Blomberg in 2007

Wenche Blomberg (23 June 1943 – 27 October 2023) was a Norwegian author, journalist, librarian, criminologist and government scholar.

== Biography ==
Wenche Blomberg was born on 23 June 1943 in Tønsberg, and grew up in Tjøme Municipality in Vestfold county. She wrote many children's books, such as Appelsinenes land (1980), about the everyday life of children in Palestine from 1947–1948, the picture book Jeg skal få en katt (1983), Kiai! (1987) and the picture book Vesle Perlegrå (2004) with illustrations by Bo Gaustad. She also wrote educational books and song books about the Middle East, including For døve ører (1990) and Karoline og vitenskapen (1993), both dealing with psychiatry, and Galskapens hus. Internering og utskilling i Norge 1550—1850 (2002), about the history of the psychiatric institution, and worked a great deal on the institution's quarterly "Prinds Christian Augusts Minde" in Oslo.

Blomberg was the leader of Bondeungdomslaget i Oslo, from 2007. She was receiving a state grant from 2008.

Wenche Blomberg died in Oslo on 27 October 2023, at the age of 80.

== Awards and honours ==
Blomberg won the Kulturdepartementets bildebokpris in 1983, the NBU-prisen in 1992, and Norway's research council's interpretation prize in 2006.
