= Even Stormoen =

Norwegian stage actor (born 1955)

- Born: 10 May 1955 (age 70); Bergen, Norway
- Occupation: Actor
- Parents: Kjell Stormoen (father); Elna Kimmestad (mother)
- Awards: Hedda Award (1998); Gammleng Award (2010)

Even Stormoen (born 10 May 1955) is a Norwegian stage actor.

== Biography ==
Born in Bergen on 10 May 1955, Stormoen is a son of actress Elna Kimmestad, and actor and theatre director Kjell Stormoen. He had his stage debut in 1978, in the musical Godspell in the Grieg Hall. He played the role "Lyngstrand" in Ibsen's The Lady from the Sea in Fjernsynsteatret in 1979. He worked for Den Nationale Scene until 1981, and for Riksteatret from 1981 to 1982. He worked for Nationaltheatret from 1983 to 1988, and at Rogaland Teater from 1989. He received both the Hedda Award in 1998 for best stage performance, and the Norwegian Critics Prize for Theatre for his role as "Harpagon" in Molière's The Miser at Rogaland Teater.

He received the Gammleng Award (for actors) in 2010.

== Dubbing Roles ==
- Judge Claude Frollo (speaking) - The Hunchback of Notre Dame (1996) - Norwegian Dub
- Scar - The Lion King (1994) - Norwegian Dub
- James P. Sullivan - Monsters Inc. (2001) and Monsters University (2013) - Norwegian Dub
