= The Seed (novel) =

Novel by Tarjei Vesaas

- First English-language publication
- Author: Tarjei Vesaas
- Original title: Kimen
- Translator: Kenneth G. Chapman
- Publisher: Gyldendal Norsk Forlag
- Publication date: 1940
- English publication date: 1964, The American-Scandinavian Foundation
- Pages: 214

The Seed (Nynorsk: Kimen) is a 1940 novel by the Norwegian writer Tarjei Vesaas. The narrative is set on a small island where a stranger settles. This is soon followed by a mysterious murder case, which creates widespread distrust in the community. The novel was the author's first departure from literary realism into a more allegorical mode of storytelling. An English translation by Kenneth G. Chapman was published in 1964, in a shared volume with Vesaas' novel Spring Night.

The Seed was the basis for a 1974 film with the same title, directed by Erik Solbakken.
