= Elna Kimmestad =

Norwegian actress (1918–1997)

Elna Kimmestad (30 July 1918 – 21 March 1997) was a Norwegian actress.

She was born in Kristiania (now Oslo), Norway. She made her stage debut in the play Erasmus Montanus at Trøndelag Teater in 1942. She worked at Den Nationale Scene from 1944 to 1945, at Trøndelag Teater again from 1945 to 1948, at Den Nationale Scene from 1948 to 1951, Rogaland Teater from 1951 to 1952, Riksteatret from 1952 to 1953, Trøndelag Teater again from 1953 to 1969 and then the National Theatre from 1969. Her specialty was comedy. She also appeared on the screen. She was married to actor Kjell Stormoen (1921–2010) from 1945 and was the mother of actress Even Stormoen.
