= Karl Arne Utgård =

Norwegian judge (born 1951)

Karl Arne Utgård (born 6 March 1951) is a Norwegian judge.

He was born in Sykkylven Municipality. He graduated with the cand.jur. degree from the University of Oslo in 1976, and worked as a research assistant there for two years. He was a Supreme Court Justice from 1999 to 31 December 2018. He was the first Supreme Court Justice who uses the Nynorsk written standard of Norwegian.

He was chairman of the board of the publishing house Det Norske Samlaget from 1981 to 1985 and of the Norwegian National Courts Administration from 2005.

Utgård received the Nynorsk User of the Year award in 2000.
