= The Birds (novel) =

Book by Tarjei Vesaas

First US edition (publ. William Morrow, 1969) Cover art by Lydia Rosier

The Birds, original Nynorsk title Fuglane, is a novel by Norwegian author Tarjei Vesaas. It was first released in 1957, and has been translated into several languages, including English.

== Synopsis ==
The story revolves around the inner world of Mattis, who is mentally disabled and lives with his sister Hege. Since it is challenging for Mattis to communicate his ideas in context and in an organized fashion, many people call him "Simple Simon" and look down on him. He faces many challenges in life, for instance, a bird which filled him with awe and hope died, and he failed to find a suitable job in the farm. However, everything changed when he rowed and his boat got beached on a rocky island. Two girls, Anna and Inger, were on vacation and found him, helping him return home. Many people saw his arrival, and Mattis became more confident. Stemming on this event, his sister Hege encourages him to become a ferryman, and Mattis ferries his only passenger Jorgen to across the lake. Jorgen stays at Hege's house, and Hege and Jorgen soon become lovers. This intimidates Mattis, as he believes that Jorgen will replace him, and Hege will leave him. Mattis, overwhelmed, escape both of them and then dies from drowning.

== Legacy ==
Being regarded as one of Vesaas' most important novels, it was included in the major Norwegian publisher Gyldendal Norsk Forlag's 30 picks for Norway's national literature both in 1967 and 1996. In 2007, the Norwegian Festival of Literature included it in a best-of list of 25 Norwegian literary works, picked by a jury of ten.

== Film ==
The 1968 Polish motion picture Matthew's Days by Witold Leszczyński was based on the novel.

The 2019 Norwegian film The Birds (Fuglane) directed by Anders T. Andersen was based on the novel.

== Translations ==
- The Birds / translated by Torbjørn Støverud and Michael Barnes. London: Peter Owen Publishers, 2013. - 224 pp. - ISBN 978-0-7206-1494-7 (paperback)
