= Guri Vesaas =

Norwegian writer and translator

- Born: 13 January 1939 (age 87); Vinje Municipality, Norway
- Education: University of Oslo
- Occupations: publishing editor and translator of children's books
- Parent(s): Tarjei Vesaas; Halldis Moren Vesaas
- Relatives: Olav Vesaas (brother)
- Awards: Bastian Prize (2005); Brage Prize honorary award (2007); Nynorsk User of the Year (2007); Order of St. Olav (2007)

Guri Vesaas (born 13 January 1939) is a Norwegian writer and translator of children's books, and former editor at the publishing house Samlaget.

== Biography ==
Vesaas was born in Vinje Municipality on 13 January 1939, a daughter of novelist Tarjei Vesaas and poet Halldis Moren Vesaas, and sister of Olav Vesaas. She graduated as cand.mag. from the University of Oslo in 1965.

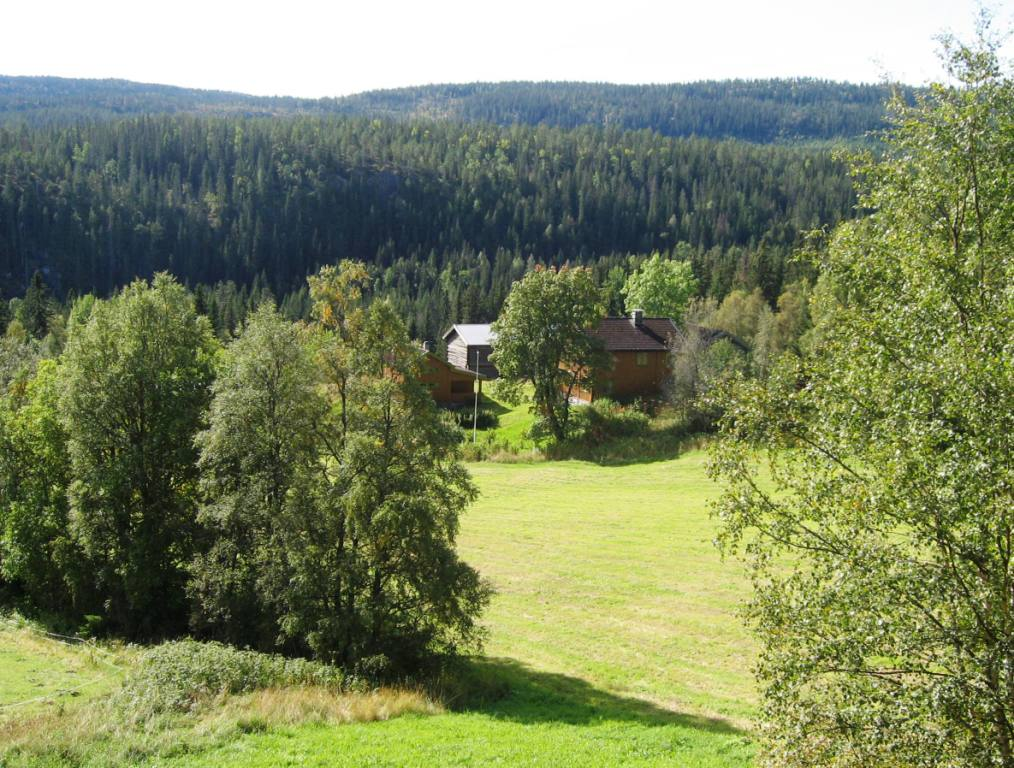
Midtbø, Vinje. Home of Tarjei Vesaas and Halldis Moren Vesaas

She has translated more than 50 children's books into Norwegian, using the pseudonym Hanna Midtbø, after the farm Midtbø in Vinje Municipality, where she grew up.

She received the Bastian Prize in 2005 for her translations of children's literature. She was awarded the Brage Prize honorary award in 2007, and also the Nynorsk User of the Year award. She was awarded Storegutprisen in 2022.

== Awards ==
- NBU-prisen 1996
- Bastian Prize 2005
- Brage Prize 2007 – honorary award
- Royal Norwegian Order of St. Olav 2007 – knight, 1st class.
