= Olav Vesaas =

Norwegian journalist

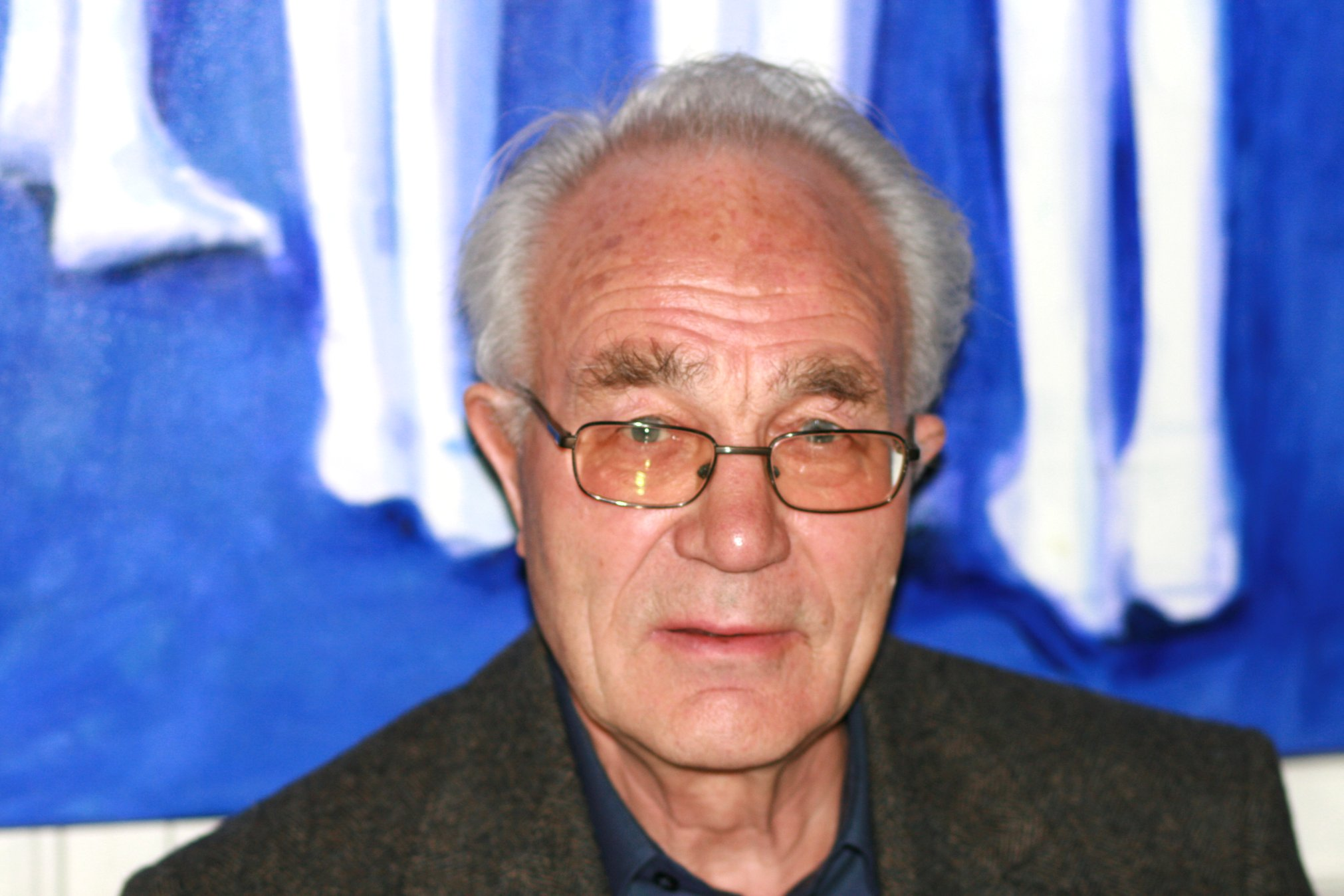
- Born: 21 December 1935 (age 90); Vinje Municipality, Norway
- Occupations: Journalist, publisher and biographer
- Employer: NRK
- Parents: Tarjei Vesaas; Halldis Moren Vesaas
- Relatives: Guri Vesaas (sister)
- Awards: Storegutprisen

Olav Vesaas (born 21 December 1935) is a Norwegian journalist, biographer and publisher.

== Biography ==
Vesaas was born on 21 December 1935 in Vinje Municipality to novelist Tarjei Vesaas and poet Halldis Moren Vesaas, and is a brother of Guri Vesaas. From 1968 to 1998 he was assigned with the Norwegian Broadcasting Corporation, where he mainly hosted programs on literature. From 1974 to 1990 he hosted the linguistic radio show Språkrøret, along with philologist Finn-Erik Vinje. From 1978 to 1980 he chaired the Nynorsk publishing house Det Norske Samlaget. In 2018 he was awarded Storegutprisen, for his lifelong contributions to literature and language.

== Selected works ==
- Løynde land (1995, biography of Tarjei Vesaas)
- A.O. Vinje – ein tankens hermann (2001, biography of Aasmund Olavsson Vinje)
- Å vera i livet (2007, biography of Halldis Moren Vesaas).
