= Halldis Moren Vesaas =

Norwegian poet, translator and writer (1907–1955)

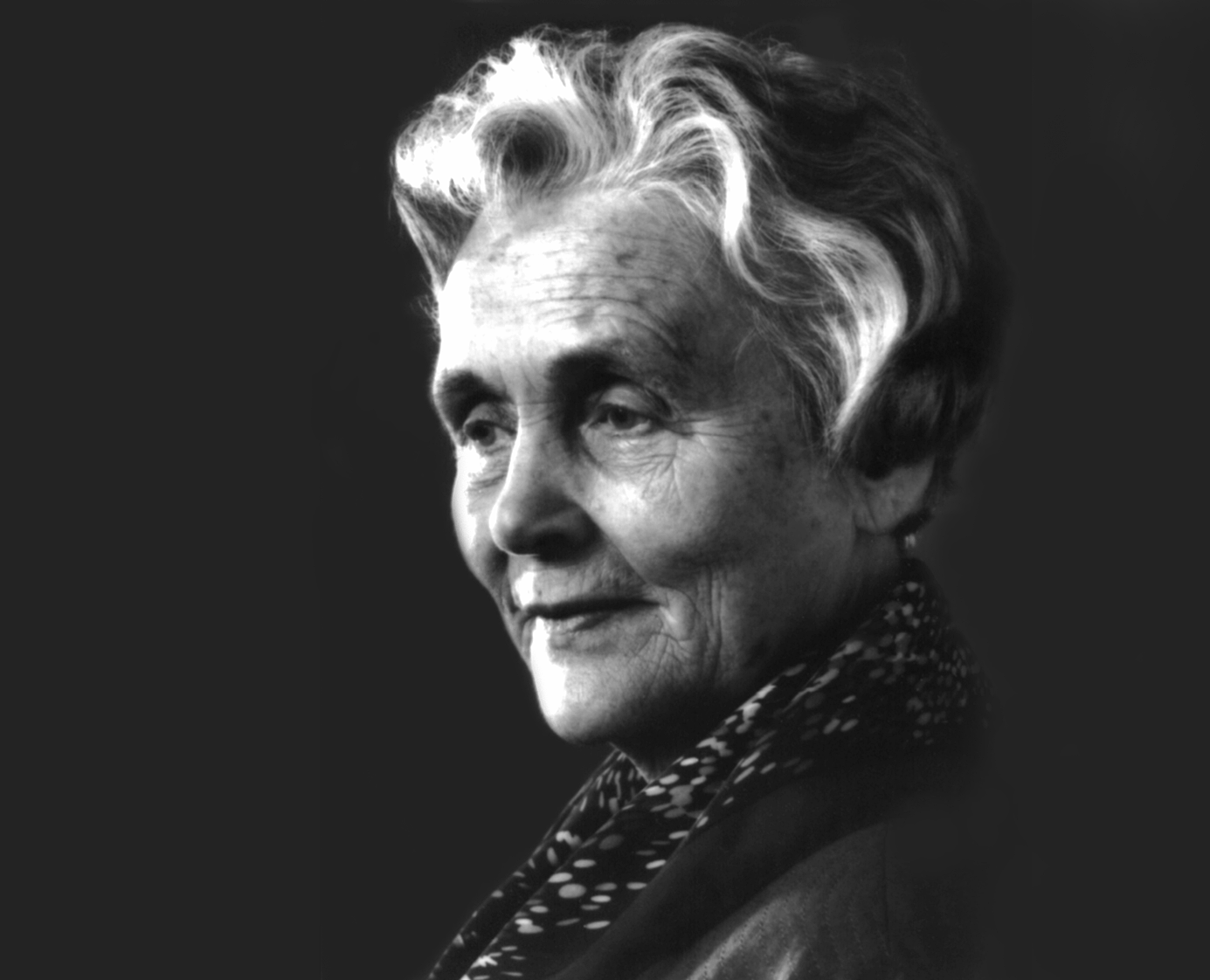
- Born: Halldis Moren; 18 November 1907; Trysil, Norway
- Died: 8 September 1995 (aged 87)
- Occupations: poet, translator and writer of children's books
- Spouse: Tarjei Vesaas (m. 1934; died 1970)
- Children: Olav Vesaas; Guri Vesaas
- Parent: Sven Moren
- Awards: Bastian Prize; Mads Wiel Nygaards Endowment; Norsk kulturråds ærespris; Order of St. Olav

Halldis Moren Vesaas (18 November 1907 – 8 September 1995) was a Norwegian poet, translator and writer of children's books. She established herself as one of the leading Norwegian writers of her generation.

== Biography ==
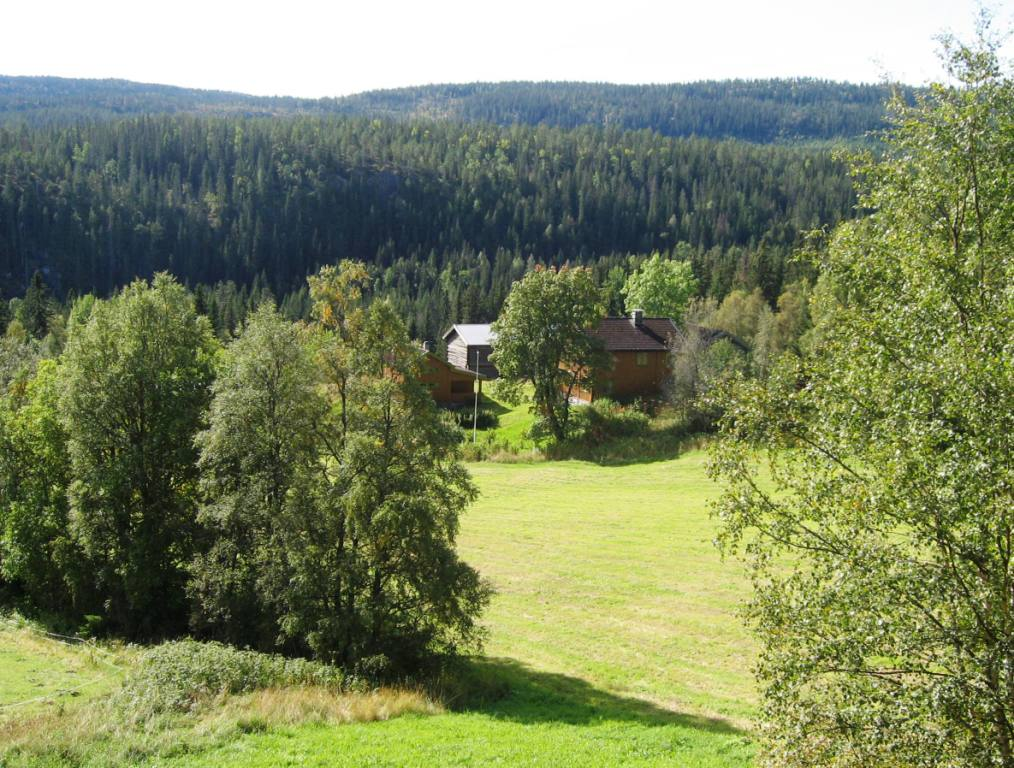
Midtbø in Vinje, site of the home of novelist Tarjei Vesaas and poet Halldis Moren Vesaas

She was born on a family farm in Trysil Municipality in Hedmark county, Norway. Her father was story writer, poet, and playwright, Sven Moren. (1871–1938). She was the eldest and only girl in a family of five children. Her brothers included philologist Sigmund Moren (1913–1996). She attended the teacher college in Elverum 1925-1928, and then held various jobs in Hamar and Oslo. In 1930 she moved to Switzerland, where she worked for three years as secretary. In April 1934, she married the Norwegian author, Tarjei Vesaas (1897-1970). They settled on the Midtbø farm in Vinje Municipality in Telemark County where her husband worked as a teacher (1941–43).

She debuted in 1929 at 22 years old with a collection of poetry, Harp and Dagger (Harpe og dolk). Her more notable books of poetry would include Speech of Troubled Times (Tung tids tale), The Tree (Treet), In a Different Forest (I ein annan skog) and House of Life (Livshus). She composed and translated for the theater, especially Det Norske Teatret in Oslo, wrote articles on various topics and was an external publishing consultant. She sat on the board of the Riksteatret (1949-1969). In 1938, her first children's book translation was published. Her writing won great acclaim in Norway for her brave and personal expressions of women's life in its several stages: youth, marriage, motherhood, widowhood and second love in old age.

Vesaas died on 8 September 1995.

== Awards and honours ==
- She was awarded the Mads Wiel Nygaards Endowment in 1977.
- She was appointed Commander of the Order of St. Olav in 1984.
- She was a Knight of the National Order of Merit, France's second-highest order.
- In 1992, she was awarded the Anders Jahre Cultural Prize (Anders Jahres kulturpris) jointly with Benny Motzfeldt.
- The Halldis Moren Vesaas Prize is named in her honor.

== Selected works ==
=== Poetry ===
- Harpe og dolk, 1929
- Morgonen, 1930
- Strender, 1933
- Lykkelege hender, 1936
- Tung tids tale, 1945
- Treet, 1947
- I ein annan skog, 1955
- Livshus, 1995

=== Children's books ===
- Du får gjera det du, 1935
- Den grøne hatten, 1938
- Hildegunn, 1942
- Tidleg på våren, 1949

== Other sources ==
- Garton, Janet ( 2002) Norwegian Women's Writing 1850-1990. Women in Context (The Athlone Press) ISBN 978-0-485-92001-7

Awards
Preceded by Hartvig Kiran	Recipient of the Bastian Prize; 1961	Succeeded by Trygve Greiff
Preceded by Erling Stordahl	Recipient of the Norsk kulturråds ærespris 1982	Succeeded by Sigmund Skard
