= Baten Kaitos =

Baten Kaitos may refer to:

- Baten Kaitos (star), the official name of Zeta Ceti's primary component, and the traditional name of the entire Zeta Ceti system
- Baten Kaitos: Eternal Wings and the Lost Ocean, a 2003 role-playing video game
  - Baten Kaitos Origins, a 2006 prequel
