= Causer =

Causer is a surname. Notable people with the surname include:

- Arthur Causer (1884–1927), English footballer
- Martin Causer (born 1973), American politician
- Murder of Michael Causer (1989–2008)

== See also ==
- Hauser
