= The Boat in the Evening =

Book by Tarjei Vesaas

- First English-language edition
- Author: Tarjei Vesaas
- Original title: Båten om kvelden
- Translator: Elizabeth Rokkan
- Language: Norwegian
- Publisher: Gyldendal Norsk Forlag; Peter Owen Publishers
- Publication date: 1968
- Publication place: Norway
- English publication date: 1971
- Pages: 208

The Boat in the Evening (Nynorsk: Båten om kvelden) is a 1968 novel by the Norwegian writer Tarjei Vesaas. It has a fragmentary and meditative narrative which centres on a child who observes a crane colony perform its breeding ritual. It was the author's final book. It was published in English in 1971, translated by Elizabeth Rokkan.

== Reception ==
Kirkus Reviews critic wrote: "From the work of the late Norwegian writer (this is his last book), there always seems to emanate that curious fiery chill of snow defining the edge of dark fjords, and this 'novel,' really a series of overlapping sketches and meditations, again is concerned with essential paradoxes. ... Vesaas' prose has a dynamic variety of rhythms and visual progressions so that even when the atmosphere is pure philosophic ozone, the reader can still keep his footing. But this is decidedly special."
