= Kjell Stormoen =

Norwegian actor, scenographer and theatre director

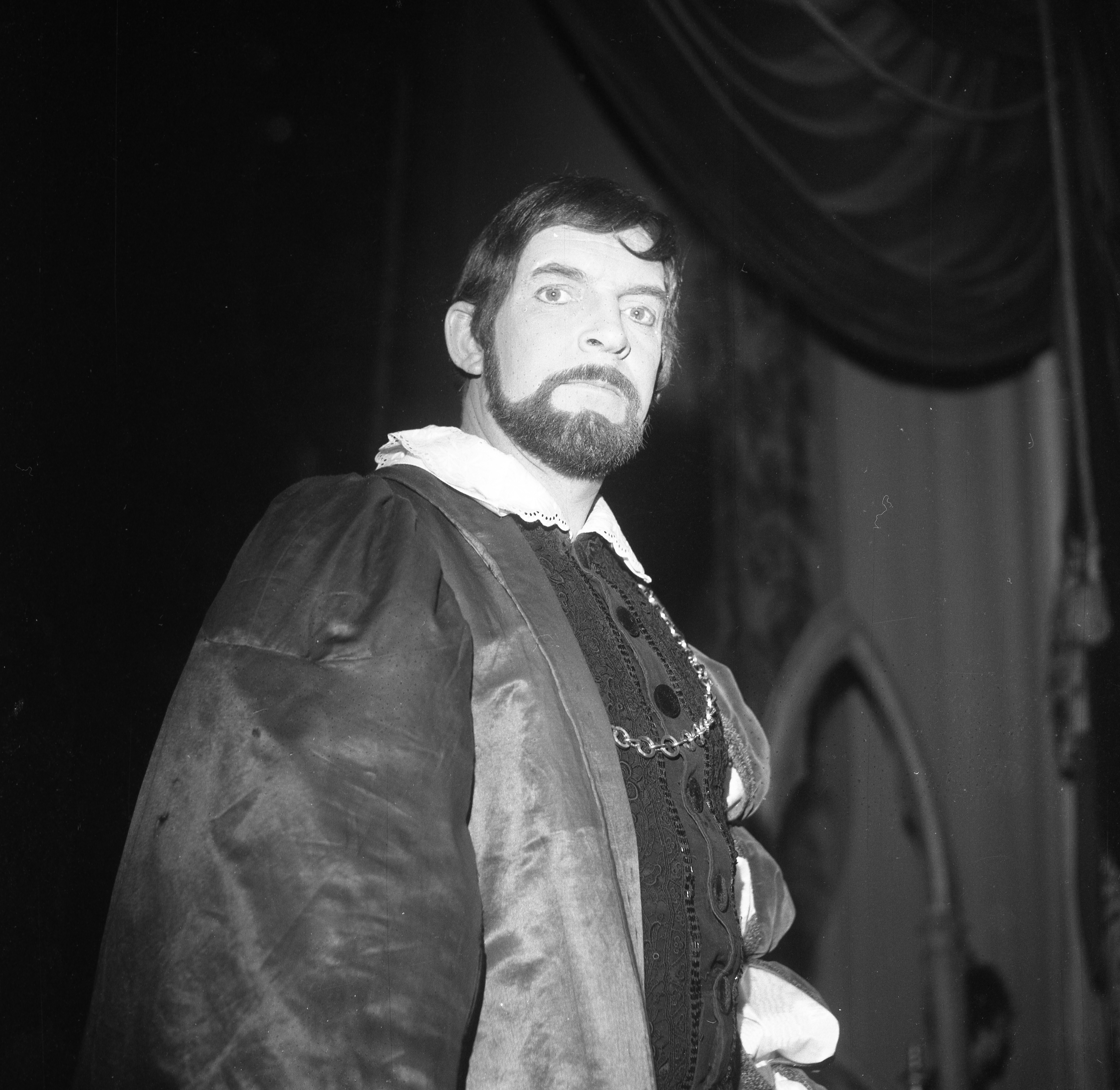
- Kjell Stormoen as Antonio in The Merchant of Venice at Den Nationale Scene in Bergen, 1969
- Born: 24 March 1921; Bergen, Norway
- Died: 22 October 2010 (aged 89)
- Occupations: actor, scenographer and theatre director
- Spouse: Elna Kimmestad (m. 1945; div. 1972)
- Children: Even Stormoen
- Relatives: Guri Stormoen (cousin)
- Awards: Amanda Award (1995)

Kjell Stormoen (24 March 1921 – 22 October 2010) was a Norwegian actor, scenographer and theatre director.

An actor and director at Rogaland Teater in the early 1950s, he was later assigned as actor to the theaters Riksteatret, Den Nationale Scene and Nationaltheatret, and was director at Trøndelag Teater from 1973 to 1979. He participated in more than twenty films, and received the Amanda Award in 1995 for his role in Eggs.

== Personal life ==
Born in Bergen on 24 March 1921, Stormoen was a son of Trygve H. Stormoen (1896–1971) and Hjørdis Henriksen (1897–1975). He was a first cousin of Guri Stormoen, and also related to Harald and Hans Stormoen. He was married twice, the first time to actor Elna Kimmestad from 1945 to 1972. They were parents of actor Even Stormoen.

== Career ==
Stormoen was educated as an engraver, but also participated in the dramatic society Bergens Dramatiske Klubb. He was a scenographer at the Trøndelag Teater from 1945 to 1948. After some time as a scenographer at the newly opened Riksteatret in 1949, he became an actor at Rogaland Teater in the same year. He was theatre director at Rogaland Teater from 1951 to 1952, and worked as an actor at Riksteatret from 1952 to 1953, at Den Nationale Scene from 1953 to 1969 and at Nationaltheatret from 1969 to 1973. He was director at Trøndelag Teater from 1973 to 1979, and again actor at Nationaltheatret from 1980 to 1986. As a film actor he participated in more than twenty movies, including Kimen (1974), Streik! (1975) and Eggs (1995). His role in Eggs earned him the Amanda Award (shared with Sverre Hansen). In 2003 he was made an honorary member of the Norwegian Actors' Equity Association.

Stormoen died on 22 October 2010, at age 89.

Cultural offices
Preceded by Jens Bolling	Director of the Rogaland Teater; 1951–1952	Succeeded by Claes Gill
