= Kåre Nordstoga =

Norwegian organist

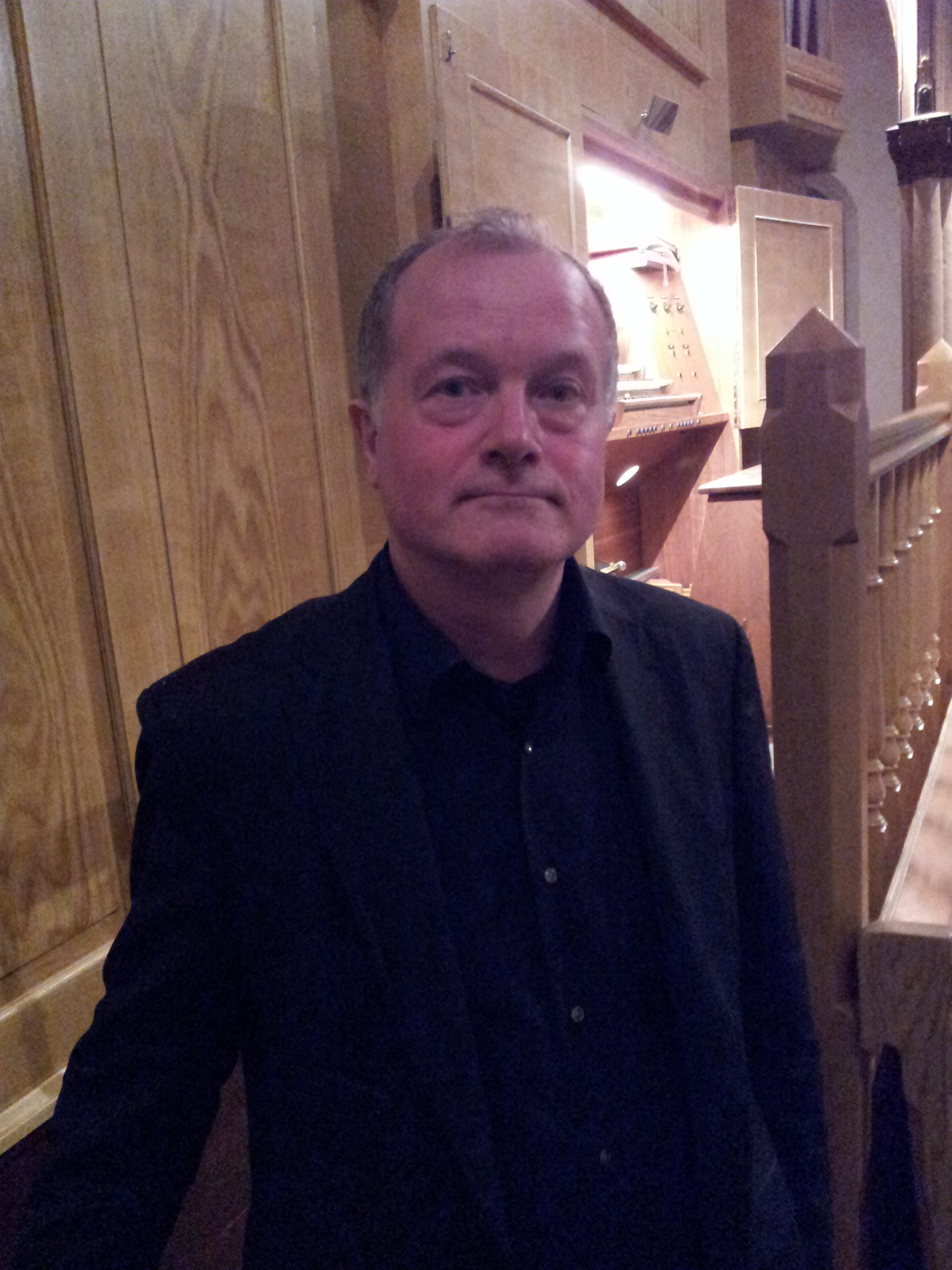
Norwegian organist Kåre Nordstoga

Kåre Nordstoga (born 18 December 1954) is a Norwegian organist.

Nordstoga had his early studies under Harald Aune and Odd Jacob Unhammer in Notodden where he grew up. He went on to study at the Norwegian Academy of Music in Oslo, where his teachers included Kaare Ørnung, Søren Gangfløt, Magne Elvestrand and Bjørn Boysen. Nordstoga has also studied with David Sanger in London.

In 1984 Nordstoga was appointed assistant organist at Oslo Cathedral, and from 1994 he has been principal organist.

His repertoire includes a wide range of organ works, the emphasis being on such Classical masters as Bach, Mozart, Franck, Widor, and Messiaen. Between 1990 and 1992 he gave a series of 30 Saturday recitals where large audiences heard him perform all of Bach's organ works, a feat that he repeated within the Bach-year 2000. His concert appearances have also brought him to the majority of European countries.

Nordstoga has made recordings for Simax, Norsk Kulturfond, Aurora, and Afontibus, which he has founded together with violinist Geir Inge Lotsberg.
