= Tarjei Vesaas =

Norwegian writer (1897–1970)

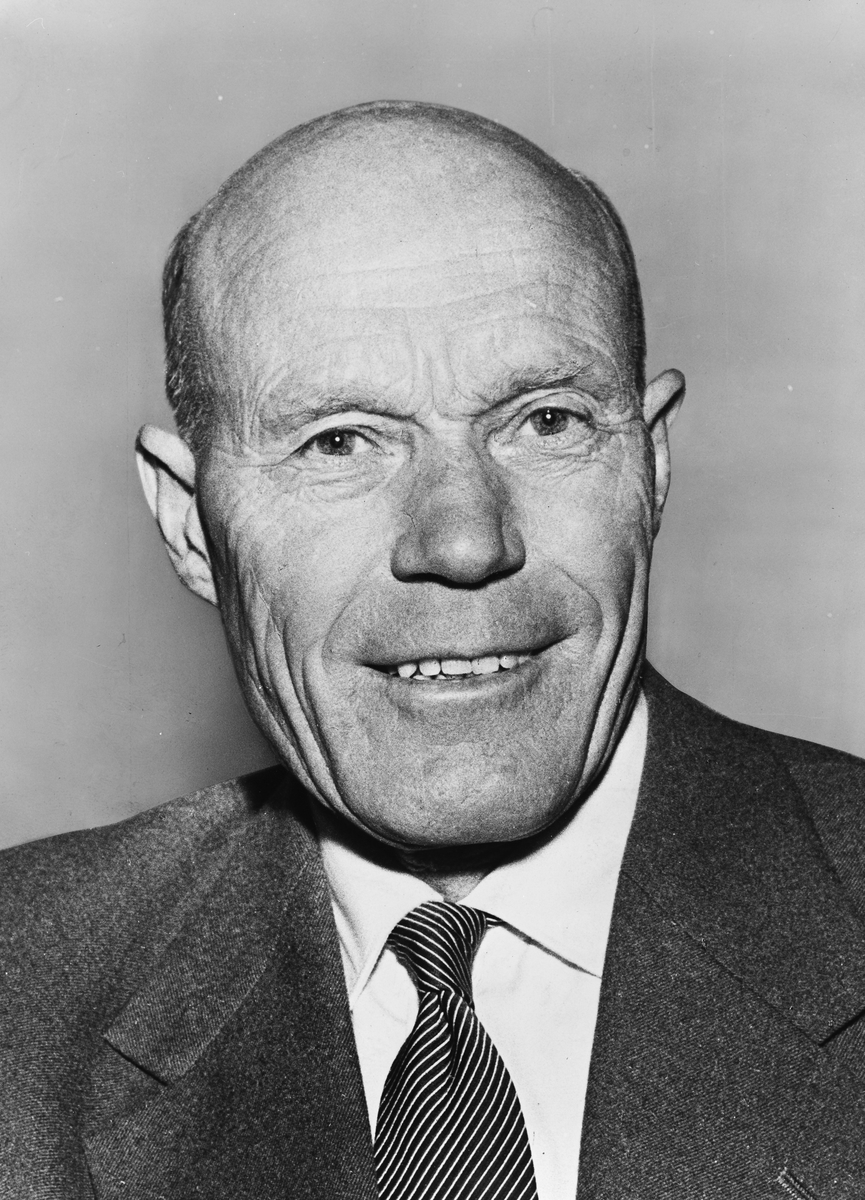
- Vesaas in 1967
- Born: August 20, 1897; Vinje, Telemark, Norway
- Died: March 15, 1970 (aged 72); Oslo, Norway
- Spouse: Halldis Moren (m. 1934)
- Children: Olav Vesaas; Guri Vesaas
- Relatives: Sven Moren (father-in-law); Sigmund Moren (brother-in-law)
- Writing career
- Language: Nynorsk
- Notable awards: Gyldendals legat (1943); Doblougprisen (1957)

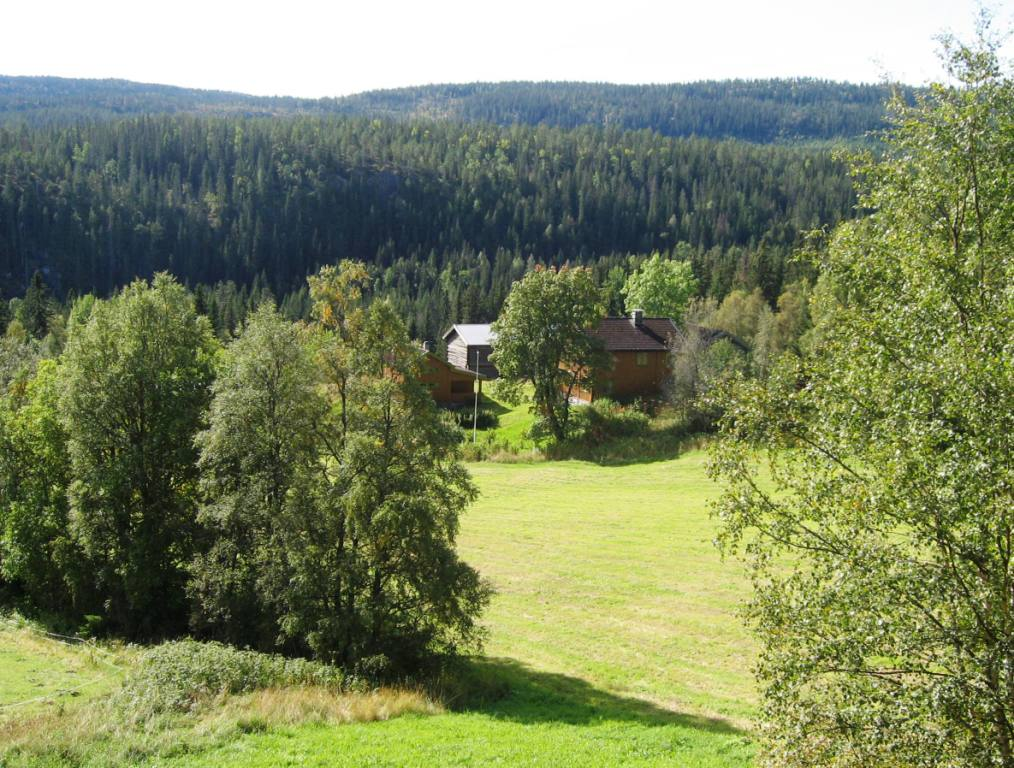
Midtbø in Vinje, site of the home of novelist Tarjei Vesaas and poet Halldis Moren Vesaas

Tarjei Vesaas (Norwegian pronunciation: ['tɑrjæɪ 'veːsoːs]) (20 August 1897 – 15 March 1970) was a Norwegian poet and novelist. Vesaas is widely considered to be one of Norway's greatest writers of the twentieth century and perhaps its most important since World War II.

Vesaas' work is characterized by simple, terse, and symbolic prose. His stories often feature rural people who go through severe psychological changes. These works are characterized by their usage of the demanding Norwegian landscape and themes such as guilt and death. His mastery of the Nynorsk written language has contributed to its acceptance as a medium of world class literature.

A prolific author, he won a number of awards, including the Gyldendal's Endowment in 1943 and the Dobloug Prize in 1957. He was nominated for the Nobel Prize in Literature on 57 occasions—once in 1946, and then every year between 1950 and 1970, often receiving multiple nominations per year.

His novels have been translated into 28 languages. Several of his books have been translated into English—many of them published by Peter Owen Publishers—among them Spring Night, The Birds, Through Naked Branches, and The Ice Palace.

== Biography ==
Vesaas was born on 20 August 1897 in Vinje Municipality, Telemark, Norway to Olav Vesaas (1870–1951), a farmer and Signe Øygarden (1870–1953), a teacher. He was the oldest of three sons, and was guilt-ridden by his refusal to take over the family farm which had been in the family for almost 300 years. He was forced to leave school at fourteen, and never had any higher education except for a year at Voss Folk High School from 1917 to 1918. Lars Eskeland, Vesaas' teacher at Voss Folk, translated some of Rabindranath Tagore's writings; these later influenced Vesaas' writing style.

He spent much of his youth in solitude, seeking comfort and solace in nature. He married the writer Halldis Moren Vesaas (the daughter of Sven Moren and the sister of Sigmund Moren) and moved to Midtbø in his home district of Vinje in 1934. They had two children: a son, Olav Vesaas and a daughter, Guri Vesaas.

His uncle was the Norwegian art historian and painter Øystein Vesaas. Sculptor Dyre Vaa, poet Aslaug Vaa, and composer Eivind Groven were his second cousins.

== Career ==
=== Early writing (1923–1933) ===
Vesaas' early writing focused on the neo-romantic tradition, with prominent religious sentiments. These early works had many authorial influences, including Rabindranath Tagore; Rudyard Kipling; Selma Lagerlöf, especially her Gösta Berling's Saga; Knut Hamsun, particularly his neo-romantic novels, Pan and Victoria; Henrik Ibsen; and Hans E. Kinck. The poems of Edith Södergran caused him to shift more towards the free verse form; Olav Aukrust, Olav Nygard, and Olaf Bull were also poetic inspirations.

Vesaas sold his first short stories to a magazine in the early 1920s. His first attempt at writing a novel was rejected by publishers, and thrown onto a fire. His debut was in 1923 with Menneskebonn (Children of Man). The novel tells the story of a boy who loses his parents and lover, yet still believes in the importance of being good. A year later, his second novel Huskuld the Herald was published, which tells the story of a village eccentric whose final years are brightened when he befriends a young child abandoned by his mother. In 1925 and 1926, Vesaas' novels Grindegard: Morgonen (Grinde Farm) and Grinde‐kveld, eller Den gode engelen (Evening at Grinde, or The Good Angel) were published.

Vesaas' first successful novel came with the release of Dei svarte hestane (The Black Horses) in 1928, after his previous works were adversely criticized. It also marked the increase in realism and contemporary awareness in Vesaas' novels. The next year, Vesaas published his first short story collection, Klokka i haugen (The Bell in the Mound), which contained seven stories written expressly for the collection. It was the first of his books to be translated into another language.

In 1930, Vesaas published Fars reise (Father's Journey), the first in a tetralogy focusing on protagonist Klas Dyregodt. The second and third books in the series, Sigrid Stallbrokk and Dei ukjende mennene (The Unknown Men), were published in 1931 and 1932, respectively. Although it was originally intended as a trilogy, the final novel in the series, Hjarta høyrer sine heimlandstonar (The Heart Hears Its Native Music), was published six years later in 1938. It has a much lighter tone than the first three novels.

In 1933, Vesaas' novel Sandeltreet (The Sandalwood) was published. The book was written over the course of a few weeks in the summer of 1933 after Vesaas' last trip abroad. It focuses on a pregnant woman who believes she will not survive the delivery process, so she goes on a journey to experience as much of life as possible.

=== Literary breakthrough and success (1934–1939) ===
Vesaas' breakthrough was in 1934 with The Great Cycle (Det store spelet), which was praised by contemporary critics. The sequel, Kvinnor ropar heim (Women Call Home), was published a year later, in 1935.

Also in 1934, Vesaas' second play Ultimatum was published; it was primarily written two years earlier in September 1932 in Strasbourg. Ultimatum focuses on the reactions of a group of young people just before a war breaks out. It features a flashing neon sign, adapted from the stage effects Vesaas had seen while traveling in Germany. The play was inspired by Vesaas' frightened reaction to German soldiers marching and holding swastikas. It was not well received by Norwegian audiences when it was first performed at Det Norske Teatret in Oslo.

Two years later saw the publication of Vesaas' second short story collection, Leiret og hjulet (The Clay and the Wheel). Most of the stories deal with the aspects of rural life.

=== Experimentation (1940–1956) ===
Vesaas' novel Kimen (The Seed) is frequently seen as a dividing line between his earlier realistic novels and his later, more symbolic and experimental works. Vesaas stated, "Among my books The Seed stands as a dividing line. It wasn't planned that way, but something so horrifying and unbelievable had happened that it simply brought with it a new way of writing. ... Some sort of new way of reacting to things." The novel was written in the summer of 1940 during the first few months of the German occupation of Norway.

In the winter and spring of 1945, Vesaas wrote his next novel, Huset i mørkret (The House in the Dark), an allegorical novel about the German occupation and the Norwegian resistance movement during the Second World War. Due to the dangers of owning the manuscript, it was hidden away in a zinc box until the end of the occupation in May 1945. The book was published in the autumn later that year. Kjeldene (The Springs), Vesaas' first poetry collection, was published in 1946. In 1931, Vesaas' wife Halldis Moren gave him a poetry collection by Edith Södergran; these inspired Vesaas to begin writing poetry himself. His initial attempts were unsuccessful, causing him to turn away from poetry. However, fourteen years later, his passion for poetry reemerged, and he wrote The Springs.

Also in 1946, Vesaas' novel Bleikeplassen (The Bleaching Place), was published. The book is an extensively reworked version of his unpublished play Vaskehuset, which he had withdrawn from its public premiere six years earlier. A year later, his second poetry collection, Leiken og lynet (The Game and the Lightning), was published. The collection marked the first time free verse dominated in Vesaas' poetry, largely due to Södergran's poetic influence.

In 1948, his novel Tårnet (The Tower) was published. Both Bleikeplassen and Tårnet were written before Huset i mørkret but published later because of the German occupation. Lykka for ferdesmenn (Wanderers' Happiness), Vesaas' third poetry collection, was published in 1949.

Vesaas' novel Signalet (The Signal) was published in 1950. The novel, set in a train station, focuses on a group of people waiting for the signal to leave, but it will never come. The book has been described as similar to the works of Franz Kafka and Samuel Beckett due to its surrealism, allegory, and mood. Vesaas' third short story collection, Vindane (The Winds), featuring thirteen stories, was published in 1952. The following year, Vesaas won the Venice Triennale Prize for the collection. Vårnatt (Spring Night), Vesaas' next novel, was published in 1954.

Two years later, Ver ny, vår draum (May Our Dream Stay New) was published; it was the last poetry collection to be published in Vesaas' lifetime.

=== Later works (1957–1970) ===
The most famous of his works are The Ice Palace (Is-slottet), a story of two girls who build a profoundly strong relationship, and The Birds (Fuglane), a story of an adult of a simple childish mind, which through his tenderhearted empathy and imagination bears the role of a seer or writer. He was awarded the Nordic Council's Literature Prize in 1963 for The Ice Palace.

Vesaas' fourth and final short story collection, Ein vakker dag (A Lovely Day), was published in 1959. The stories in the collection primarily deal with everyday events. His penultimate novel, Bruene (The Bridges), was published in 1968. Two years later, his final novel, Båten om Kvelden (The Boat in the Evening) was published. The book consists of lyrical sketches which often, according to scholar Kenneth G. Chapman, eliminates "the distinction between prose and poetry."

His final poetry collection, Liv ved straumen (Life by the Stream), was released posthumously in 1970. It is generally considered his best collection.

== In popular culture ==
One of his poems features in S3E6 of the famous Norwegian TV series Skam. Its original name is "Kvart menneske er ei øy", which translates to "Every man is an island", the first line of the poem inverting the line by John Donne.

== Awards ==
- 1943 – Gyldendal's Endowment (Gyldendals legat)
- 1946 – Melsom Prize (Melsom-prisen)
- 1957 – Dobloug Prize (Doblougprisen)
- 1964 – Nordic Council's Literature Prize (Nordisk råds litteraturpris)
- 1967 – Norwegian Booksellers' Prize (Bokhandlerprisen)

== Works ==
=== Novels ===
- Menneskebonn (Children of Man, 1923)
- Sendemann Huskuld (Huskuld the Herald, 1924)
- Dei svarte hestane (The Black Horses, 1928)
- Sandeltreet (The Sandalwood, 1933)
- Kimen (The Seed, 1940)
  - Translated by Kenneth G. Chapman (Peter Owen Publishers, 1964)
- Huset i mørkret (The House in the Dark, 1945)
  - Translated by Elizabeth Rokkan (Peter Owen Publishers, 1976)
- Bleikeplassen (The Bleaching Place, 1946)
  - Translated by Elizabeth Rokkan (Peter Owen Publishers, 1981); published as The Bleaching Yard
- Tårnet (The Tower, 1948)
- Signalet (The Signal, 1950)
- Vårnatt (Spring Night, 1954)
  - Translated by Kenneth G. Chapman (Peter Owen Publishers, 1964)
- Fuglane (The Birds, 1957)
  - Translated by Torbjørn Støverud and Michael Barnes (Peter Owen Publishers, 1968)
- Brannen (The Fire, 1961)
- Is-slottet (The Ice Palace, 1963)
  - Translated by Elizabeth Rokkan (Peter Owen Publishers, 1966)
- Bruene (The Bridges, 1966)
  - Translated by Elizabeth Rokkan (Peter Owen Publishers, 1969)
- Båten om Kvelden (The Boat in the Evening, 1968)
  - Translated by Elizabeth Rokkan (Peter Owen Publishers, 1971)
  - In 2019, the same translation was republished by Archipelago Books under the title The Hills Reply

==== Grinde Farm series ====
- Grindegard: Morgonen (Grinde Farm, 1925)
- Grinde‐kveld, eller Den gode engelen (Evening at Grinde, or The Good Angel, 1926)

==== Klas Dyregodt series ====
- Fars reise (Father's Journey, 1930)
- Sigrid Stallbrokk (1931)
- Dei ukjende mennene (The Unknown Men, 1932)
- Hjarta høyrer sine heimlandstonar (The Heart Hears Its Native Music, 1938)

==== The Great Cycle series ====
- Det store spelet (The Great Cycle, 1934)
  - Translated by Elizabeth Rokkan (University of Wisconsin Press, 1967)
- Kvinnor ropar heim (Women Call Home, 1935)

=== Poetry ===
- Kjeldene (The Springs, 1946)
- Leiken og lynet (The Game and the Lightning, 1947)
- Lykka for ferdesmenn (Wanderers' Happiness, 1949)
- Løynde eldars land (Land of Hidden Fires, 1953)
  - Translated by Fritz König and Jerry Crisp (Wayne State University Press, 1973)
- Ver ny, vår draum (May Our Dream Stay New, 1956)
- Liv ved straumen (Life by the Stream, 1970)

=== Short story collections ===
- Klokka i haugen (The Bell in the Mound, 1929)
- Leiret og hjulet (The Clay and the Wheel, 1936)
- Vindane (The Winds, 1952)
- Ein vakker dag (A Lovely Day, 1959)

=== Plays ===
- Guds bustader (God's Abodes, 1925)
- Ultimatum (1934)
- Morgonvinden (Morning Wind, 1947)

== See also ==
- Tarjei Vesaas' debutantpris

== Sources ==
- Chapman, Kenneth G. (1970). Tarjei Vesaas. New York: Twayne Publishers. LCCN 78-110715.
- Greenwald, Roger (2018). Introduction. Through Naked Branches: Selected Poems of Tarjei Vesaas. By Vesaas, Tarjei. Greenwald, Roger (ed.). Translated by Greenwald, Roger. Black Widow Press. ISBN 9780999580349.
- König, Fritz (1973). Introduction. Løynde eldars land [Land of Hidden Fires]. By Vesaas, Tarjei (in Norwegian Nynorsk). Translated by König, Fritz; Crisp, Jerry. Wayne State University Press. ISBN 0814314961.
- McFarlane, James Walter (1960). Ibsen and the Temper of Norwegian Literature. London: Oxford University Press.

== Related reading ==
- Encyclopedia of World Literature in the 20th Century, vol. 4, ed. S. R. Serafin, 1999;
- Columbia Dictionary of Modern European Literature, ed. Jean-Albert Bédé & William B. Edgerton, 1980;
