= National identity number (Norway) =

Norwegian national identity number

The national identity number (Norwegian: fødselsnummer, "birth number"; Northern Sami: riegádannummir) is an eleven-digit unique identifier issued to residents and citizens of Norway. The issuing of the identity number corresponds to being registered in the national population register. The ID number is used throughout government administration and a number of private sector services, in particular banking and insurance. All official IDs, including passports, national ID cards, driving licenses and bank cards contain the National Identity Number.

The ID number was introduced in 1964 and issued to everyone who was part of the 1960 census and has since been issued to anyone born in Norway, resident in Norway and all Norwegian citizens who have been issued a passport. D-numbers (D-nummer), introduced in 1978, allow people who are not resident to be issued an ID number, including foreign-resident workers and foreign land-owners. The ID numbers were initially issued by Statistics Norway, but along with the operation of the Population Register this was turned over to the Norwegian Tax Administration in 1992. It has since become a vital part of e-government services to the population.

The number is in the format D_{1}D_{2}M_{1}M_{2}Y_{1}Y_{2}I_{1}I_{2}I_{3}C_{1}C_{2}, where D is day of birth, M is month of birth, Y is the last two digits of the year of birth, I is an individual number and C are two independently calculated checksums. I_{1} contains information about the century of birth, while the gender is coded in I_{3} (females are even, males are odd numbers). Increased immigration rates combined with a policy of not reusing numbers will gradually deplete the pool of available numbers. From 2032 additional numbers will become available and the gender coding will be removed.

== History ==
The initiative for the National Identity Number came from the business sector. As both the Tax Administration and the National Insurance Service were increasingly using computers for their data processing, they introduced various identification and serial numbers of people and employees. These were different across government agencies, and also between municipalities and could even change from year to year. The population register in Oslo, introduced in 1959, was at the time using an eight-digit ID-number, consisting of six digits representing the birth date and two individual numbers.

The Ministry of Finance took initiative to establish a common government identity number, and the process was led by Statistics Norway. Two main systems were considered, one which encoded the person's birth date and gender, and an eight-digit number that did not carry any information. An important inspiration was the Swedish personal identity number, which had been introduced in 1947. It had a nine-digit number, led by a six-digit birth date, then had a number based on the county of birth, and a gender-encoded number. At the time a major advantage of this approach was that because the birth date and gender were encoded, it was possible to record this information without additional fields during data processing. Because it was desirable that any resident remember their own identification number, adding five digits to the end of their birth date was deemed easier for people to remember than eight arbitrary digits.

The decision to introduce the numbering scheme was taken by Statistics Norway in 1964, with the backing of the Ministry of Finance, but without any legislation. Numbers were assigned to everyone who had been part of the 1960 census, even if they had died in the meantime. The oldest person to be issued a number was born in 1855. However, people who were born or immigrated after the census but had died before 1964 were not issued numbers. From the onset, the responsibility to maintain the actual registers was placed with the municipalities, who had traditionally held a register of all residents. The central register was merely an index of issued numbers. This changed in 1991, after the registers had been fully digitized and the responsibility for the content transferred to the Tax Administration.

In the 1970s there was an increasing number of people with a temporary connection to Norway. Initially this was mostly sailors working on Norwegian ships, and who were therefore liable to pay taxes to Norway. D-numbers were issued from 1978, for which people who had tax or welfare obligations to Norway were issued, even though they were not residents. The "D" term refers to the Directorate of Sailors. From the 1990s D-numbers were increasingly issued to more groups of people who needed to be identified in Norway.

== Issuing ==
An ID number is issued to a person when they are registered in the National Population Registry, which is operated by the Norwegian Tax Administration. Everyone born in Norway is registered and issued a number, as is everyone who later becomes a resident for more than six months. Finally, non-resident Norwegian citizens are issued a number when processing their first passport. People who emigrate from Norway retain their number for life.

People who are first issued D-numbers get a new, ordinary identity number if they later become full residents. If ID numbers are issued with incorrect information, a new number is issued. Similarly, a person who undergoes a judicial sex change is issued a new ID number. Both of these issues can cause problems as the person can have documents issued to two different ID numbers. ID numbers are never reused, as they would then lose their value as a unique identifier.

== Numerical components ==
The National Identity Number is eleven digits. The first six digits correspond to the person's birth date in the format DDMMYY. These six digits are referred to as the birth date. The last five digits, called the person number (personnummer), consists of three identity digits and two check digits. In human-readable places, the ID number is often written with a space between the birth date and the person number. The last identity digit (ninth overall) is coded with the person's gender: females are even and males are odd.

The first identity number (seventh overall) is coded in line with the century of birth, according to the following table. For people with a birth year ending in 40–54, and where I_{3} is 9, this has been allocated to two centuries. For those born between 1940 and 1954 this is held as a reserve that may be used to allocate numbers to new immigrants born in those years. Because immigration numbers for these age groups is low, it is estimated that the reserve series will never be used.

Century coding
I_{1}	Years
0	1940–2039
1–4	1940–2039
5–7	1855–99; 2000–54
8	2000–54
9	1940–99; 2040–54

=== Check digits ===
The last two digits of the ID number are check digit, or checksums. The check digit algorithm is the weighted sum modulo 11. The first check digit is calculated based on the first nine digits, while the second includes the first check digit in its calculation. The two use different weights. The first had been optimized to catch common errors, while the latter was IBM's default values.

In its initial use, it was presumed that a resident would say their ID number to a clerk, who would write the number down in a form. There were two errors that could happen at this stage—the resident could remember their number wrong, alternatively the clerk would misunderstand the person. At the time of data processing, the form would be transferred to a punch card and there was a further chance of a punching error by the operator. A preliminary survey with Oslo residents recording their own tax number showed that common errors including the clerk misunderstanding the 9th and 10th ("niende" and "tiende") and people switching their birth day and birth month. The error correction was therefore optimized to avoid these errors. Estimates from 1964 showed an expected error rate of 50 in 100,000 transactions with one digit used for error correction, and 1 in 100,000 if two digits were used. Of this reason, two were selected. A major restriction of the algorithm was that it needed to be supported by the IBM 402 tabulating machines used by Statistics Norway at the time.

The advantages of using modulo 11 is that it is able to capture all single-digit errors and all transposition errors. The downside is that this formula produces a checksum of between 0 and 10. Because only single-digit checksums are allowed, seventeen percent of potential ID numbers are discarded, reducing the pool of available ID numbers.

Today, the numbers are normally typed in directly by the resident themselves. Increased use also means that people are more likely to remember their number, significantly reducing the need for control digits. For this reason, a new series of ID numbers issued from 2032 will allow more valid checksums, allowing for increased range of numbers to be issued.

== D-number ==
A D-number is issued to people who have to interact with Norwegian authorities, but are not regarded as resident in the country. D-numbers are built up with the same structures as ordinary ID numbers, with two notable differences. The first is that 4 is added to the first digit. Secondly, the century issue with digit seven is different, with people born before 1 January 2000 being issued 0 through 4, and people born on or after that day being issued 5 through 9.

Commonly D-numbers are issued to European Economic Area citizens who are working in Norway or in other ways have obligations to pay tax or receive welfare benefits, without being resident; refugees while awaiting processing of the resident applications; people who open bank accounts in Norwegian banks; people who have to be registered in certain public registers; people who own securities deposited in Norway; people who own real estate in Norway; people resident in Svalbard; and people seeking authorization as health personnel.

As of 2014 there were 1.3 million D-numbers issued. That year there were being issued more D-numbers than ordinary ID numbers, and it was estimated that the ability to issue D-numbers would deplete faster than with ordinary numbers. One reason for this was a disproportionate number of receives are men.

Non-EEA citizens, including landed refugees, receive a DUF-number upon registering their resident applications. This twelve-digit number is only used within processing with the immigration authorities. Once a resident permit is issued, they receive an ID number.

== Use ==
The National Identity Number is used as a unique identifier throughout the public sector, including in the heath sector and education. The number is normally used to identify users with e-government services; often the number is used as the user name when login in to public services and financial institutions. The number is also used by private institutions that have to report individual data to relevant government agencies, such as reporting income, assets and debt to the Tax Administration. Thus the number is used by employers, banks, insurance companies, telephone companies and housing cooperatives.

Because the authorities encouraged people not to share their ID numbers without due cause, many people regarded the number as confidential. This was further exacerbated by public and private institutions at various times confusing the concepts of identification and authentication. In other words, the very knowledge of a person's ID number would be seen sufficient to authenticate them. This has never been the intention of use, and is also not lawful. Where authentication is needed, the person must either use a physical ID or an electronic authentication. The confusion caused a vicious circle, where people became increasingly reluctant to share or use their ID number, perpetuating the problem. ID numbers are easy to come by, for instance they are printed on all official ID documents and most correspondence from both the public sector, financial institutions and payslips. Identity theft due to accepting ID numbers as authentication has been common in Norway. In comparison, in Sweden and Iceland, where the ID numbers are regarded as public information, ID theft through misuse of ID numbers is a non-issue.

== Future ==
From 2032 it is expected that the current series of ID numbers will be depleted. From then on all newly issued ID numbers will have three changes. First, the first check digit will allow an increased range of valid values, allowing more numbers to be used. Second, the coding of gender will disappear. Finally, the digit indicating century will be removed. For this reason, the number can no longer establish the absolute birth date of a person. The main benefit of the change is that all existing ID numbers will continue to be valid.
