= Semmingsen =

Semmingsen is a Norwegian surname. Notable people with the surname include:

- Ingrid Semmingsen (1910–1995), Norwegian historian
- Rolf Ingvar Semmingsen (1908–1979), Norwegian civil servant
- Tuva Semmingsen (born 1975), Norwegian mezzo-soprano and coloratura singer
