= Eivind Nævdal-Bolstad =

Norwegian politician (born 1987)

Bergen City Commissioner for Urban Development
- Incumbent
- Assumed office 4 April 2025
- Chief Commissioner: Christine B. Meyer; Chris Jørgen Rødland
- Preceded by: Christine Kahrs

Bergen City Commissioner of Finance
- In office 30 October 2023 – 27 May 2024
- Chief Commissioner: Christine B. Meyer
- Preceded by: Rune Bakervik
- Succeeded by: Jacob Mæhle

Deputy Member of the Storting
- In office 1 October 2009 – 30 September 2013
- Constituency: Hordaland

Personal details
- Born: 23 April 1987 (age 39) Odda, Hordaland, Norway
- Party: Conservative

Eivind Nævdal-Bolstad (born 23 April 1987 in Odda) is a Norwegian politician for the Conservative Party. He has served as the Commissioner for Urban Development in Bergen in the city governments of Christine B. Meyer and Chris Jørgen Rødland since April 2025. He previously served as the Commissioner for Finance from October 2023 to May 2024.

== Early life and education ==
Though he hails from Odda, he moved to study at Volda University College in 2010.

Nævdal-Bolstad holds a bachelor's degree in Public relations, communication and media from Volda University College, and has worked in both Mowi and Geelmuyden Kiese.

== Political career ==
=== Local politics ===
Nævdal-Bolstad was elected to the municipal council of Volda Municipality in 2011. He served as the Deputy mayor of Volda Municipality from 2011 to 2013.

Nævdal-Bolstad was first elected to the municipal council in Bergen Municipality during the 2019 local elections. From 2021 to 2023 he led the Bergen Conservatives.

He was appointed Bergen City Commissioner of Finance on 30 October 2023, when Christine B. Meyer formed her city government following the 2023 local elections. On 27 May 2024, he resigned as city commissioner after appointing several board members to Bergen Havn and Fløibanen AS without officially putting them forwards in cabinet meetings. Fellow commissioner Charlotte Spurkeland was appointed acting finance commissioner until the appointment of Jacob Mæhle on 27 June. Following the resignation of Christine Kahrs, he was appointed city commissioner for urban development on 4 April 2025. He was retained by Chris Jørgen Rødland when he became chief commissioner in September 2026.

=== Parliament ===
He served as a deputy representative to the Storting from Hordaland between 2009 and 2013. As deputy of Henning Warloe he met in parliamentary session for a total of 172 days.
