= Rolf Ingvar Semmingsen =

Norwegian civil servant (1908–1979)

Rolf Ingvar Semmingsen (August 13, 1908 – May 1, 1979) was a Norwegian civil servant.

He was born in Stor-Elvdal Municipality in Hedmark, Norway. He was the son of Martin Semmingsen (1875–1964) and Anne Strand (1874–1961). Having graduated as cand.jur., he was hired as assistant secretary in the Norwegian Price Directorate (Konkurransetilsynet) in 1940. In 1946 he was promoted to assistant director under Wilhelm Thagaard. He worked as director of the cooperative Coop NKL (Norges Kooperative Landsforening) from 1949 to 1960, but returned to the Price Directorate to serve as director from 1961 to 1977. In 1994 the Norwegian Price Directorate was restructured as the Norwegian Competition Authority.

He was married to historian Ingrid Semmingsen (1910–1995).

Preceded by Wilhelm Thagaard	Director of the Norwegian Price Directorate; 1961–1977	Succeeded by Charles Philipson
