= Visa requirements for Norwegian citizens =

Administrative entry restrictions

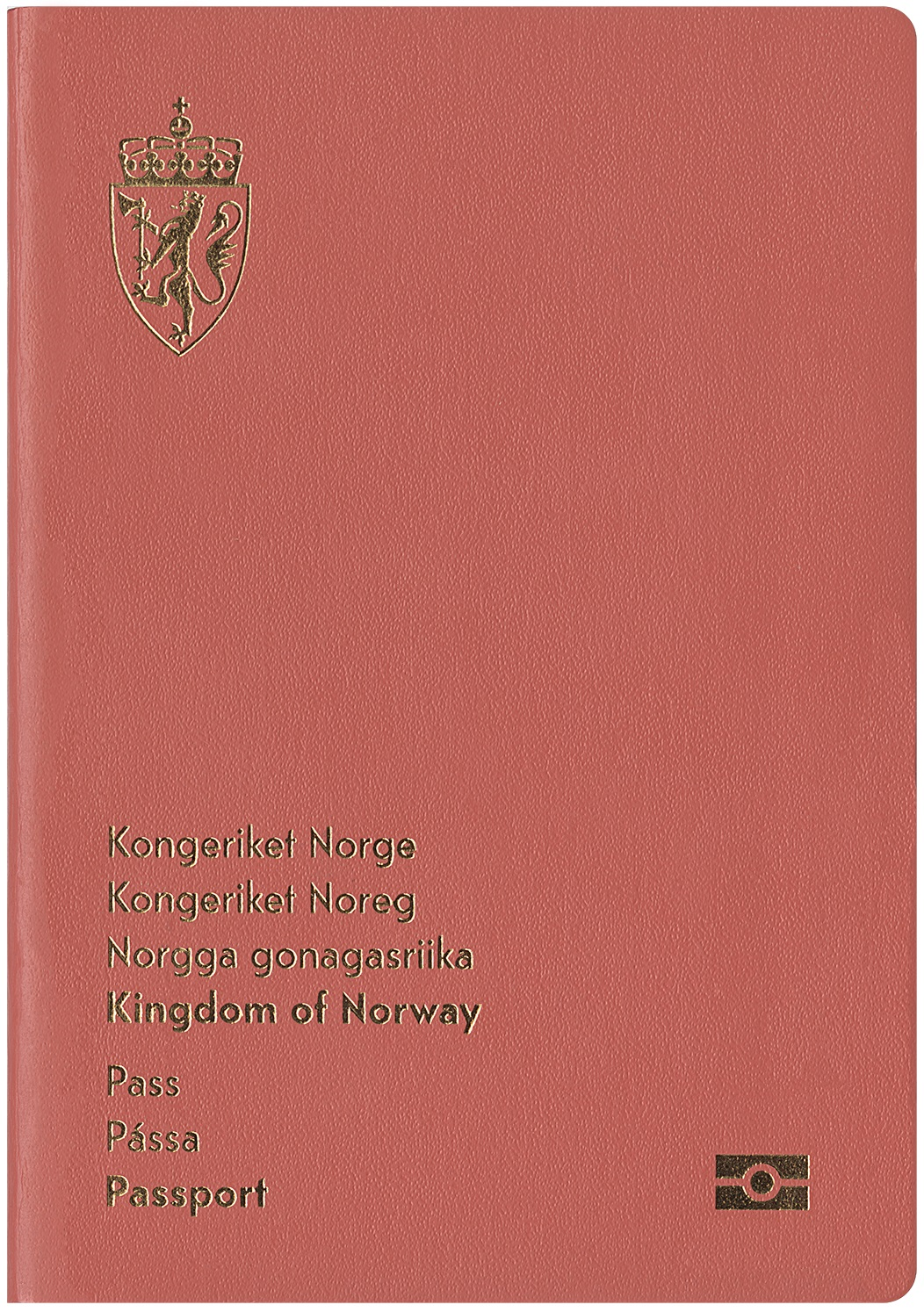
A Norwegian passport

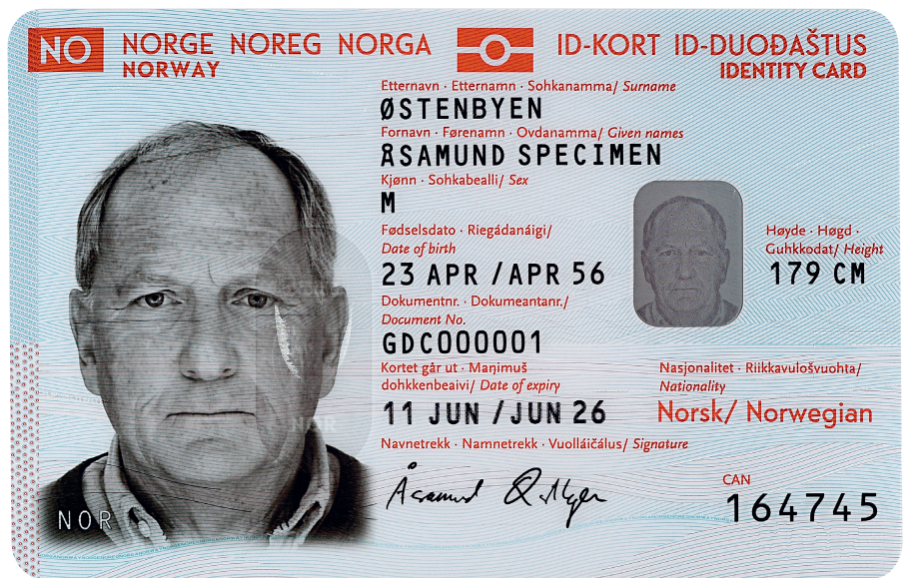
A Norwegian national identity card is valid for travel to most European countries

Visa requirements for Norwegian citizens are administrative entry restrictions by the authorities of other states placed on citizens of Norway.

As of 2026, Norwegian citizens had visa-free or visa on arrival access to 185 countries and territories, ranking the Norwegian passport 4th, tied with passports from Denmark, Ireland, Luxembourg, Netherlands and Sweden in the world according to the Henley Passport Index.

As a member state of the European Free Trade Association (EFTA), Norwegian citizens enjoy freedom of movement to live and work in other EFTA countries in accordance with the EFTA convention. Moreover, by virtue of Norway's membership of the European Economic Area (EEA), Norwegian citizens also enjoy freedom of movement within all EEA member states. The Citizens' Rights Directive defines the right of free movement for citizens of the EEA, and all EFTA and EU citizens are not only visa-exempt but are legally entitled to enter and reside in each other's countries.

In order to travel to another country, a Norwegian citizen requires a passport, except within the Nordic Passport Union, where no identity card is formally required. However, an identity card such as a Norwegian driving licence is useful. A passport is also not required for holders of the Norwegian national identity card for travel to EU or EFTA countries, as well as certain other countries.

== Visa requirements map ==
Visa requirements for Norwegian citizens holding ordinary passports Norway Freedom of movement Visa not required / ESTA / eTA / eVisitor Visa on arrival eVisa Visa available both on arrival or online Visa required

== Visa requirements ==
Country	Visa requirement	Allowed stay	Notes (excluding departure fees)
Afghanistan	eVisa	30 days	Visa is not required in case born in Afghanistan or can proof that one of their parents is a national of Afghanistan or born in Afghanistan.; e-Visa : Visitors must arrive at Kabul International (KBL).
Albania	Visa not required	90 days	
Algeria	Visa required		Passengers who travel as tourists to cities in the south of Algeria (Timimoun, Ghardaia, Ilizi, Djanet or Tamanraset) can obtain a visa upon arrival for a maximum of 30 days. They must have a return/onward ticket and a hotel reservation confirmation.
Andorra	Visa not required	90 days	
Angola	Visa not required	30 days	Maximum 3 entries per calendar year; 30 days per trip, but no more than 90 days within any 1 calendar year for tourism purposes only.; Visitors must have a return/onward ticket and a hotel reservation confirmation.; An International Certificate of Vaccination is required.
Antigua and Barbuda	Visa not required	6 months	
Argentina	Visa not required	90 days	
Armenia	Visa not required	180 days	
Australia	eVisitor	90 days	90 days on each visit in 12-month period if granted.
Austria	Visa not required	Freedom of movement.	
Azerbaijan	eVisa	30 days	
Bahamas	Visa not required	8 months	
Bahrain	eVisa / Visa on arrival	14 days / 1 month	
Bangladesh	Visa on arrival	30 days	
Barbados	Visa not required	6 months	
Belarus	Visa not required	30 days	Visa-free until 31 December 2025.
Belgium	Visa not required	Freedom of movement.	
Belize	Visa not required		
Benin	eVisa	30 days	Must have an international vaccination certificate.; Three types of electronic visa are offered: the e-Visa valid for 30 days for a single entry (50€), the e-Visa valid for 30 days for several (multiple) entries (75€), and the e-Visa valid for 90 days to make several (multiple) entries (100€)
Bhutan	eVisa	90 days	As part of the visa application process, you will be required to pay the Sustainable Development Fee (SDF) of US$100 per day.
Bolivia	Visa not required	90 days	
Bosnia and Herzegovina	Visa not required	90 days	90 days within any 6-month period.
Botswana	Visa not required	90 days	
Brazil	Visa not required	90 days	
Brunei	Visa not required	90 days	
Bulgaria	Visa not required	Freedom of movement.	
Burkina Faso	eVisa / Visa on arrival	1 month	
Burundi	Visa on arrival	1 month	From December 2021, passengers of all countries that required visa, can now obtain visa on arrival at Bujumbura International Airport, and all land borders.
Cambodia	eVisa / Visa on arrival	30 days	
Cameroon	eVisa		
Canada	eTA / Visa not required	6 months	eTA required if arriving by air.
Cape Verde	EASE	30 days	
Central African Republic	Visa required		
Chad	eVisa	90 days	
Chile	Visa not required	90 days	
China	Visa not required	30 days	Temporarily visa-free from 8 November 2024 to 31 December 2026.; Permanent visa not required to Hainan for 15 days.; 240-hour (10-day) visa-free transit to a third country or region (including Hong Kong, Macau or Taiwan) using any mode of transport. Must have a confirmed onward ticket/itinerary, and enter through 1 of 64 approved ports.; During which, may freely travel within the 24 provinces permitted for visa-free transit and engage in tourism, business, and visits.; 24-hour visa-free transit to a third country or region (including Hong Kong, Macau, and Taiwan), is available at most international airports, without leaving the airport.; Travellers who need to leave the airport may obtain a temporary entry permit from immigration.; 5-day port visa (Visa on Arrival) for Shenzhen if arriving at designated ports of entry from Hong Kong by land or sea, for stays within Shenzhen.; 3-day port visa (Visa on Arrival) if arriving in Zhuhai or Xiamen at designated ports of entry, for stays within the respective city.; 15-day visa-free entry for cruise ship passengers in tour groups, if arriving at any cruise port along China's coastline, including but not limited to Tianjin; Dalian; Shanghai; Lianyungang; Wenzhou; Zhoushan; Xiamen; Qingdao; Guangzhou; Shenzhen; Beihai; Haikou; Sanya. May further travel inland to all regions of coastal provinces (and equivalents) and Beijing.; May apply for a port visa (Visa on Arrival) if travelling for an urgent, qualified reason. Prior clearance for port visa is highly recommended or may be denied boarding by airlines.
Colombia	Visa not required	90 days	90 days - extendable up to 180-days stay within a 1-year period.
Comoros	Visa on arrival	45 days	Nationals of any country can obtain a visa on arrival for a maximum stay of 45 days. Also, the cost is 30 euros or 50 USD.
Republic of the Congo	Visa required		
Democratic Republic of the Congo	eVisa	7 days	
Costa Rica	Visa not required	90 days	
Côte d'Ivoire	eVisa	3 months	e-Visa holders must arrive via Port Bouet Airport.
Croatia	Visa not required	Freedom of movement.	
Cuba	eVisa	90 days	The tourist visa is valid for a single entry to Cuba, for a stay of 90 days, extendable for 90 days.
Cyprus	Visa not required	Freedom of movement	
Czech Republic	Visa not required	Freedom of movement	
Denmark	Visa not required	Freedom of movement (including Faroe Islands and Greenland).	
Djibouti	eVisa	90 days	
Dominica	Visa not required	6 months	
Dominican Republic	Visa not required	30 days	Can be extended up to 120 days with fee
Ecuador	Visa not required	90 days	
Egypt	eVisa / Visa on arrival	30 days	
El Salvador	Visa not required	90 days	
Equatorial Guinea	eVisa		Must arrive via Malabo International Airport, processing fee 75 USD
Eritrea	Visa required		
Estonia	Visa not required	Freedom of movement	
Eswatini	Visa not required	30 days	
Ethiopia	eVisa / Visa on arrival	90 days	Visa on arrival is obtainable only at Addis Ababa Bole International Airport.; e-Visa holders must arrive via Addis Ababa Bole International Airport.; e-Visa is available for 30 or 90 days.
Fiji	Visa not required	4 months	
Finland	Visa not required	Freedom of movement	
France	Visa not required	Freedom of movement (in Regions of France)	
Gabon	eVisa	90 days	e-Visa holders must arrive via Libreville International Airport.
Gambia	Visa not required	90 days	
Georgia	Visa not required	1 year	
Germany	Visa not required	Freedom of movement	
Ghana	Visa required		
Greece	Visa not required	Freedom of movement	
Grenada	Visa not required	3 months	
Guatemala	Visa not required	90 days	
Guinea	eVisa	90 days	International Certificate of Vaccination required.
Guinea-Bissau	Visa on arrival	90 days	
Guyana	Visa not required	90 days	
Haiti	Visa not required	90 days	
Honduras	Visa not required	90 days	
Hungary	Visa not required	Freedom of movement	
Iceland	Visa not required	Freedom of movement	
India	eVisa	30 days	e-Visa holders must arrive via 32 designated airports (Note: Ahmedabad; Amritsar; Bagdogra; Bengaluru; Bhubaneswar; Chandigarh; Chennai; Coimbatore; Delhi; Gaya; Goa-Dabolim; Goa-Manohar; Guwahati; Hyderabad; Indore; Jaipur; Kannur; Kochi; Kolkata; Kozhikode; Lucknow; Madurai; Mangaluru; Mumbai; Nagpur; Port Blair; Pune; Surat; Thiruvananthapuram; Tiruchirappalli; Varanasi; Visakhapatnam) or 5 designated seaports. (Note: Chennai; Cochin; Mormugao (Goa); Mumbai; Mangalore); An Indian e-Tourist Visa may only be obtained twice within 1 calendar year.; Foreigners of Pakistani origin or who hold a Pakistani Passport are not eligible for an e-Visa. Foreigners who are not Pakistani nationals, but whose parents or grandparents (either paternal or maternal) were born in, or were permanent residents in Pakistan, are also not eligible for an e-Visa.
Indonesia	e-VOA / Visa on arrival	30 days	
Iran	eVisa	30 days	Passengers who arrive at Kish (KIH) or Qeshm (GSM) do not need a visa for a maximum of 14 days.; Passengers can obtain a visa upon arrival at Mashhad International Airport (MHD), Tabriz International Airport (TBZ), Esfahan International Airport (IFN), Bandar Abbas International Airport (BND) and Shiraz International Airport (SYZ) for a maximum of 30 days.
Iraq	eVisa		
Ireland	Visa not required	Freedom of movement	
Israel	Electronic Travel Authorization	90 days	
Italy	Visa not required	Freedom of movement	
Jamaica	Visa not required	90 days	
Japan	Visa not required	90 days	
Jordan	eVisa / Visa on arrival	30 days	Visa can be obtained upon arrival, it will cost a total of 40 JOD, obtainable at most international ports of entry and land border crossings (except King Hussein/Allenby Bridge).
Kazakhstan	Visa not required	30 days	
Kenya	Electronic Travel Authorisation	90 days	Applications can be submitted up to 90 days prior to travel and must be submitted at least 3 days in advance.; eTA fee is 32.50 USD.; Proof of reservation at the hotel where visitors plan to stay is required (if staying with friends, an invitation letter is also acceptable).; Yellow fever vaccination certificate is required if coming from endemic countries.
Kiribati	Visa not required	90 days	90 days within any calendar year period
North Korea	Visa required		
South Korea	Electronical Travel Authorization	90 days	The validity period of a K-ETA is 3 years from the date of approval.
Kuwait	eVisa / Visa on arrival	3 months	
Kyrgyzstan	Visa not required	60 days	
Laos	Visa not required	15 days	Visa not required from 1 July to 31 December 2024.; eVisa and Visa on arrival also available.; 18 (Note: Savannakhet Airport; Lanetoui - Mengkang (China); Meuangmom - Wan Pong (Myanmar); Banvang - Ban Khok Phai (Thailand); Namngeun - Huay Kon (Thailand); Paksan - Bueng Kan (Thailand); Paktaphan - Pak Saeng (Thailand); Pangmon - Ban Huak (Thailand); Phoudou (Thailand); Dak ta ock - Nam Giang (Vietnam); La Lai (Vietnam); Namkan (Vietnam); Namphao - Cau Treo (Vietnam); Namsoy - Na Meo (Vietnam); Naphao - Cha Lo (Vietnam); Pahang - Long Sap (Vietnam); Panghok - Tây Trang (Vietnam); Phoukeua - Bo Y (Vietnam)) of the 33 border crossings are only open to regular visa holders.; e-Visa may be used to enter Laos through the Luang Prabang, Pakse and Vientiane international airports, 3 Thai-Lao Friendship Bridges (Note: Vientiane (Friendship Bridge 1); Savannakhet (Friendship Bridge 2); Bokeo (Friendship Bridge 4)), in Boten (road and railroad), and in Vientiane (at Khamsavath railway station).; Visa on arrival is available at the Luang Prabang, Pakse and Vientiane international airports, 4 Thai-Lao Friendship Bridges (Note: Vientiane (Friendship Bridge 1); Savannakhet (Friendship Bridge 2); Khammouane (Friendship Bridge 3); Bokeo (Friendship Bridge 4)) and 7 border crossings. (Note: Nongnokkheane - Trapeang Kriel (Cambodia); Boten - Bo han (China); Golden Triangle/Samliemkham (Thailand); Khamsavath railway station (Thailand); Namheuang - Ban Na Kraseng (Thailand); Vang tao - Chongmek (Thailand); Dansavan - Lao Bảo (Vietnam))
Latvia	Visa not required	Freedom of movement.	
Lebanon	Free visa on arrival	1 month	Extendable for 2 additional months.; Granted free of charge at Beirut International Airport or any other port of entry if there is no Israeli visa or seal, holding a telephone number, an address in Lebanon, and a non refundable return or circle trip ticket.
Lesotho	Visa not required	14 days	44 days eVisa also available.
Liberia	eVisa		
Libya	eVisa		
Liechtenstein	Visa not required	Freedom of movement.	
Lithuania	Visa not required	Freedom of movement.	
Luxembourg	Visa not required	Freedom of movement.	
Madagascar	Visa on arrival	60 days	
Malawi	Visa not required	30 days	
Malaysia	Visa not required	90 days	
Maldives	Free visa on arrival	30 days	
Mali	Visa required		
Malta	Visa not required	Freedom of movement.	
Marshall Islands	Visa on arrival	90 days	Visitors wishing to travel to Kwajalein are required to hold an Entry Authorization issued by the United States Military.
Mauritania	eVisa		
Mauritius	Visa not required	180 days	180 days per calendar year for tourism, 120 days per calendar year for business.
Mexico	Visa not required	180 days	
Micronesia	Visa not required	90 days	90 days within any 180 day period.
Moldova	Visa not required	90 days	90 days within any 180 days period.
Monaco	Visa not required		
Mongolia	Visa not required	30 days	The Ministry of Foreign Affairs of Mongolia has exempted visas for 34 countries from January 2023 to December 2026.
Montenegro	Visa not required	90 days	
Morocco	Visa not required	90 days	
Mozambique	Visa not required	30 days	Travelers must register on the e-Visa platform at least 48 hours prior to travel and pay a processing fee of 650 MT.
Myanmar	eVisa	28 days	e-Visa holders must arrive via Yangon, Nay Pyi Taw or Mandalay airports or via land border crossings with Thailand — Tachileik, Myawaddy and Kawthaung or India — Rih Khaw Dar and Tamu.; e-Visa available for both tourism (allowed stay is 28 days) or business (allowed stay is 70 days) purposes.
Namibia	eVisa / Visa on arrival	30 days	
Nauru	Visa required		
Nepal	Online Visa / Visa on arrival	90 days	
Netherlands	Visa not required	Freedom of movement (European Netherlands).	
New Zealand	Electronic Travel Authority	3 months	International Visitor Conservation and Tourism Levy must be paid upon requesting an Electronic Travel Authority.; Holders of an Australian Permanent Resident Visa or Resident Return Visa may be granted a New Zealand Resident Visa on arrival permitting indefinite stay (pursuant to the Trans-Tasman Travel Arrangement), subject to meeting character requirements and obtaining an Electronic Travel Authority prior to departure. Such travellers are not required to pay the International Visitor Conservation and Tourism Levy.
Nicaragua	Visa not required	90 days	
Niger	Visa required		
Nigeria	eVisa	90 days	
North Macedonia	Visa not required	90 days	
Oman	Visa not required / eVisa	14 days / 30 days	
Pakistan	eVisa	90 days	Issued free of charge as of August 2024.
Palau	Visa not required	90 days	
Panama	Visa not required	90 days	
Papua New Guinea	Easy Visitor Permit	60 days	Free visa valid for 60 days (extension is possible for a fee) on arrival at Port Moresby or Tokua (Rabaul).
Paraguay	Visa not required	90 days	
Peru	Visa not required	90 days	
Philippines	Visa not required	30 days	
Poland	Visa not required	Freedom of movement	
Portugal	Visa not required	Freedom of movement	
Qatar	Visa not required	90 days	
Romania	Visa not required	Freedom of movement	
Russia	eVisa	16 days	
Rwanda	eVisa / Visa on arrival	30 days	
Saint Kitts and Nevis	Electronic Travel Authorisation	3 months	
Saint Lucia	Visa not required	90 days	
Saint Vincent and the Grenadines	Visa not required	6 months	
Samoa	Visa not required	90 days	
San Marino	Visa not required	90 days	
São Tomé and Príncipe	Visa not required	15 days	
Saudi Arabia	eVisa / Visa on arrival	90 days	
Senegal	Visa on arrival	90 days	
Serbia	Visa not required	90 days	90 days within any 6-month period.
Seychelles	Visa not required	90 days	90 days within 180 days period
Sierra Leone	eVisa / Visa on arrival	3 months / 30 days	It is valid for only for one month but can be extended at the immigration department once in-country.
Singapore	Visa not required	90 days	
Slovakia	Visa not required	Freedom of movement.	
Slovenia	Visa not required	Freedom of movement.	
Solomon Islands	Visa not required	90 days	90 days within any 180 day period.
Somalia	eVisa		
South Africa	Visa not required	90 days	
South Sudan	eVisa		Obtainable online, 90 days for 200 USD and 180 days for 350 USD.; Printed visa authorization must be presented at the time of travel.
Spain	Visa not required	Freedom of movement.	
Sri Lanka	eVisa / Visa on arrival	60 days / 30 days	Sri Lanka introduced an ETA valid for 30 days.
Sudan	Visa required		
Suriname	Visa not required	90 days	An entrance fee of USD 50 or EUR 50 must be paid online prior to arrival.; Multiple entry e-Visa is also available.
Sweden	Visa not required	Freedom of movement.	
Switzerland	Visa not required	Freedom of movement within EFTA.	
Syria	eVisa		
Tajikistan	Visa not required	30 days	Visa also available online.; e-Visa holders can enter through all border points.
Tanzania	eVisa / Visa on arrival	90 days	
Thailand	Visa not required	60 days	
Timor-Leste	Visa not required	90 days	90 days within any 180 days period.
Togo	eVisa	15 days	
Tonga	Visa not required	90 days	90 days within any 180 day period.
Trinidad and Tobago	Visa not required	90 days	90 days within any 180 day period.
Tunisia	Visa not required	3 months	
Turkey	Visa not required	90 days	90 days within any 180 day period.
Turkmenistan	Visa required		
Tuvalu	Visa not required	90 days	
Uganda	eVisa	3 months	Determined at the port of entry.; Must apply online at least 2 business days prior to travel. As of March 2017, airlines may deny passengers permission to board flights to Uganda without proof that they had successfully applied for an e-Visa. Ugandan immigration authorities may require additional documentation, including proof of a return plane ticket and detailed tour itinerary in Uganda.; International Certificate of Vaccination required.
Ukraine	Visa not required	90 days	90 days within any 180 day period.
United Arab Emirates	Visa not required	90 days	90 days within any 180 day period
United Kingdom	Electronic Travel Authorisation	6 months	
United States	Visa Waiver Program	90 days	ESTA is valid for 2 years from the date of issuance.; ESTA is also required when entering the country by cruise ship or land.; A Form I-94 is required for entry into the United States by land. It carries a $30 fee and can be obtained either online or upon arrival.; Visa required for nationals of VWP countries who have travelled or been present in Iran, Iraq, Libya, North Korea, Somalia, Sudan, Syria or Yemen at any time on or after 1 March 2011 or Cuba at any time on or after 12 January 2021, or nationals of VWP countries who are also nationals of Iran, Iraq, North Korea, Sudan or Syria. Exceptions apply if the travel was in military or diplomatic service of the VWP country.
Uruguay	Visa not required	90 days	
Uzbekistan	Visa not required	30 days	
Vanuatu	Visa not required	90 days	
Vatican City	Visa not required	90 days	
Venezuela	Visa not required	90 days	
Vietnam	Visa not required	45 days	Extended visas available at the following airports: Ho Chi Minh City, Hanoi, Phu Quoc, or Danang.; A single entry eVisa valid for 90 days is also available.; 30 day visa exemption at Phu Quoc Island.
Yemen	Visa required		
Zambia	Visa not required	90 days	Also eligible for a universal visa allowing access to Zimbabwe.
Zimbabwe	eVisa / Visa on arrival	30 days	Also eligible for a universal visa allowing access to Zambia.

== Territories, disputed areas or restricted zones ==
Visa requirements for Norwegian citizens for visits to various territories, disputed areas, partially recognized countries and restricted zones:

Visitor to	Visa requirement	Notes (excluding departure fees)
Europe
Abkhazia	Visa required	Tourists from all countries (except Georgia) can visit Abkhazia for a period not exceeding 24 hours as part of an organized tourist group.
Kosovo	Visa not required	90 days
(Greece) Mount Athos	Special permit required	Special permit required (4 days: 25 euro for Orthodox visitors, 35 euro for non-Orthodox visitors, 18 euro for students). There is a visitors' quota: maximum 100 Orthodox and 10 non-Orthodox per day and women are not allowed.
(Belarus) Brest and Grodno	Visa not required	Visa-free for 10 days
Northern Cyprus	Visa not required	3 months
(United Nations) UN Buffer Zone in Cyprus	Access Permit required	Access Permit is required for travelling inside the zone, except Civil Use Areas.
(Denmark) Faroe Islands	Freedom of movement	ID card valid.
(Finland) Åland	Freedom of movement	ID card valid.
(Germany) Büsingen am Hochrhein and Heligoland	Freedom of movement	ID card valid.
Livigno and Campione d'Italia	Freedom of movement	ID card valid.
Gibraltar	Visa not required	Up to 6 months.
Guernsey	Visa not required	90 days within a 12 month period.
Isle of Man	Visa not required	Up to 6 months.
Jersey	Visa not required	Up to 6 months.
(Norway) Jan Mayen	Freedom of movement	Unlimited, Norwegian citizens may live and work freely
(Norway) Svalbard	Freedom of movement	Unlimited, Norwegian citizens may live and work freely
(Portugal) Azores and Madeira	Freedom of movement	ID card valid.
Russia	Special authorization required	Several closed cities and regions in Russia require special authorization.
(Switzerland) Samnaun	Freedom of movement	ID card valid.
South Ossetia	Visa not required	Multiple entry visa to Russia and three-day prior notification are required to enter South Ossetia.
Transnistria	Visa not required	Registration required after 24h.
Africa
Eritrea outside Asmara	Travel permit required	To travel in the rest of the country, a Travel Permit for Foreigners is required (20 Eritrean nakfa).
Mayotte	Freedom of movement	ID card valid.
Réunion	Freedom of movement	ID card valid.
Ascension Island	eVisa	3 months within any year period.
Saint Helena	Visitor's Pass required	Visitor's Pass granted on arrival valid for 4/10/21/60/90 days for 12/14/16/20/25 pound sterling.
Tristan da Cunha	Permission required	Permission to land required for 15/30 pounds sterling (yacht/ship passenger) for Tristan da Cunha Island or 20 pounds sterling for Gough Island, Inaccessible Island or Nightingale Islands.
(Spain) Canary Islands, Ceuta and Melilla	Freedom of movement	ID card valid.
Sahrawi Arab Democratic Republic	Undefined	Undefined visa regime in the Western Sahara, same entry requirements with Morocco, controlled territory.
Somaliland	Visa on arrival	30 days for 30 US dollars, payable on arrival.
Sudan outside Khartoum	Travel permit required	All foreigners traveling more than 25 kilometers outside of Khartoum must obtain a travel permit.
(Sudan) Darfur	Travel permit required	Separate travel permit is required.
Asia
British Indian Ocean Territory	Special permit required	Special permit required.
India PAP/RAP	PAP/RAP required	Protected Area Permit (PAP) required for whole states of Nagaland and Sikkim, and parts of states Manipur, Arunachal Pradesh, Uttarakhand, Jammu and Kashmir, Rajasthan, Himachal Pradesh.; Restricted Area Permit (RAP) required for all of Andaman and Nicobar Islands and parts of Sikkim. Some of these requirements are occasionally lifted for a year.
Iraqi Kurdistan	Free Visa stamp on arrival	You can apply for an e-Visa (30 days) to visit the Iraqi Kurdistan Region.
(Kazakhstan) Baikonur & Priozersk	Special permission required	Special permission required for the town of Baikonur and surrounding areas in Kyzylorda Oblast, and the town of Gvardeyskiy near Almaty.
(Iran) Kish Island	Visa not required	Visitors to Kish Island do not require a visa.
(Malaysia) Sabah and Sarawak	Visa not required	These states have their own immigration authorities and passport is required to travel to them, however the same visa applies.
Maldives outside Malé	Permission required	Tourists are generally prohibited from visiting non-resort islands without the express permission of the Government of Maldives.
North Korea outside Pyongyang	Special permit required	People are not allowed to leave the capital city, tourists can only leave the capital with a governmental tourist guide (no independent moving)
Palestine	Visa not required	Arrival by sea to Gaza Strip not allowed.
(Tajikistan) Gorno-Badakhshan Autonomous Province	OIVR permit required	OIVR permit required (15+5 Tajikistani Somoni) and another special permit (free of charge) is required for Lake Sarez.
Hong Kong	Visa not required	3 months
Macau	Visa not required	90 days
Taiwan	Visa not required	90 days
(China) Tibet Autonomous Region	TTP required	Tibet Travel Permit required (10 US Dollars).
Turkmenistan	Special permit required	A special permit, issued prior to arrival by Ministry of Foreign Affairs, is required if visiting the following places: Atamurat, Cheleken, Dashoguz, Serakhs and Serhetabat.
(United Nations) Korean Demilitarized Zone	Restricted area	
(United Nations) UNDOF Zone and Ghajar	Restricted area	
Yemen outside Sanaa or Aden	Special permission required	Special permission needed for travel outside Sanaa or Aden.
Americas
Anguilla	Visa not required	3 months
Bermuda	Visa not required	Up to 6 months; Decided on arrival.
British Virgin Islands	Visa not required	30 days; Extensions possible.
Cayman Islands	Visa not required	6 months
Montserrat	Visa not required	6 months
Turks and Caicos Islands	Visa not required	90 days
(Netherlands) Aruba, Curaçao and Sint Maarten	Visa not required	3 months
(Netherlands) Bonaire, Sint Eustatius and Saba	Visa not required	3 months
(France) French Guiana＆Saint Pierre and Miquelon	Freedom of movement	ID card valid.
(France) French West Indies	Freedom of movement	ID card valid. French West Indies refers to Martinique, Guadeloupe, Saint Martin and Saint Barthélemy.
(Denmark) Greenland	Freedom of movement	ID card valid.
Puerto Rico	Visa not required	Visa not required under the Visa Waiver Program, for 90 days on arrival from overseas for 2 years. ESTA required.
U.S. Virgin Islands	Visa not required	Visa not required under the Visa Waiver Program, for 90 days on arrival from overseas for 2 years. ESTA required.
(Venezuela) Margarita Island	Visa not required	All visitors are fingerprinted.
(Colombia) San Andrés and Leticia	Tourist Card on arrival	Visitors arriving at Gustavo Rojas Pinilla International Airport and Alfredo Vásquez Cobo International Airport must buy tourist cards on arrival.
(Ecuador) Galápagos	Pre-registration required	Online pre-registration is required. Transit Control Card must also be obtained at the airport prior to departure.
Oceania
(Australia) Ashmore and Cartier Islands	Special authorisation required	Special authorisation required.
(Australia) Macquarie Island	Special authorisation permit	A written authorisation of the Director of National Parks and Wildlife is required.
Cook Islands	Visa not required	31 days
Niue	Visa not required	30 days
Tokelau	Entry permit required	10 days/3 months/1 year. Visitors permits/Residence permits/Work permits/Special permits granted, allow the permit holder to be in Tokelau, for up to 10 days/3 months/1 year, unless otherwise specified. Apply for a travel permit at the Tokelau office in Apia, Samoa, at least 2 weeks prior to travel. Visitors are required to hold proof of sufficient funds to cover their stay.; The amount of funds needed is NZD 1,000 - per person per month of stay or NZD 400 - if accommodation. Tokelau can only be reached by boat from Samoa, and a permit from the Samoan Immigration Authorities is required to leave and re-enter Samoa.
Norfolk Island	eVisitor	120 days; Visa is issued upon arrival for a visit of up to max stay of 120 days, for holders of a multiple entry eVisitor issued by Australia, valid 30 days beyond the period of intended stay in Norfolk Island.; From 1 July 2016 all movement between Norfolk Island and Australian mainland are considered as domestic movement, however all passenger are still required to carry passports or, for Australian citizens, some type of photographic identification and pass Customs and Immigration. Normal Australian Customs and Immigration procedures apply when entry is made from outside Australia. Passenger not carrying their passports aren't eligible to purchase duty-free goods on Norfolk Island.
Christmas Island	Visa not required	90 days; Passports and visas are not required when travelling from the Australian mainland. However, photographic identification must be produced for clearance through Customs and Immigration. Normal Australian Customs and Immigration procedures apply when entry is made from outside Australia.
Cocos (Keeling) Islands	Visa not required	90 days; Passports and visas are not required when travelling from the Australian mainland. However, photographic identification must be produced for clearance through Customs and Immigration. Normal Australian Customs and Immigration procedures apply when entry is made from outside Australia.
(Fiji) Lau Province	Special permission required	Special permission required.
(France) Clipperton Island	Special permit required	Special permit required.
French Polynesia	Freedom of movement	ID card valid.
New Caledonia	Freedom of movement	ID card valid.
(France) Wallis and Futuna	Freedom of movement	ID card valid.
Pitcairn Islands	Visa not required	14 days visa free and landing fee 35 USD or tax of 5 USD if not going ashore.
American Samoa	Electronic authorization	30 days
Guam	Visa not required	45 days
Northern Mariana Islands	Visa not required	45 days
United States Minor Outlying Islands	Special permits required	Special permits required for Midway Atoll, Wake Island, Johnston Atoll, Kingman Reef, Palmyra Atoll, Howland Island, Baker Island, Jarvis Island, and Navassa Island.
South Atlantic and Antarctica
Falkland Islands	Visa not required	A visitor permit is normally issued as a stamp in the passport on arrival, The maximum validity period is 1 month.
South Georgia and the South Sandwich Islands	Permit required	Pre-arrival permit from the Commissioner required (72 hours/1 month for 110/160 pounds sterling).
Antarctica	Permit required	Special permits required for British Antarctic Territory, French Southern and Antarctic Lands, Argentine Antarctica, (Australia) Australian Antarctic Territory, Bouvet Island, (Antártica Chilena Province) Chilean Antarctic Territory, (Australia) Heard Island and McDonald Islands, (Norway) Peter I Island, (Norway) Queen Maud Land, (New Zealand) Ross Dependency.

== Non-visa restrictions ==
=== Blank passport pages ===
Many countries require a minimum number of blank pages to be available in the passport being presented, typically one or two pages. Endorsement pages, which often appear after the visa pages, are not counted as being valid or available.

=== Vaccination ===
Cover of the new International Certificate of Vaccination issued by the Bureau of Quarantine in the Philippines since 2021

The African countries of Angola, Benin, Burkina Faso, Burundi, Cameroon, Central African Republic, Democratic Republic of the Congo, Republic of the Congo, Côte d'Ivoire, Gabon, Ghana, Guinea-Bissau, Mali, Niger, Sierra Leone and Togo, South Sudan and Uganda, along with French Guiana in South America, require all incoming passengers older than nine months to one year, to have a current International Certificate of Vaccination or Prophylaxis.

Some other countries require vaccination only if the passenger is coming from an infected area or has visited one recently or has transited for 12 hours in those countries: Algeria, Botswana, Cabo Verde, Chad, Djibouti, Egypt, Eswatini, Ethiopia, Gambia, Ghana, Guinea, Lesotho, Libya, Equatorial Guinea, Eritrea, Madagascar, Malawi, Mauritania, Mauritius, Mozambique, Namibia, Nigeria, Papua New Guinea, Seychelles, Somalia, South Africa, Sudan, Tunisia, Uganda, Tanzania, Zambia and Zimbabwe.

=== Passport validity length ===
Very few countries, such as Paraguay, just require a valid passport on arrival.

However many countries and groupings now require only an identity card – especially from their neighbours. Other countries may have special bilateral arrangements that depart from the generality of their passport validity length policies to shorten the period of passport validity required for each other's citizens or even accept passports that have already expired (but not been cancelled).

Some countries, such as Japan, Ireland and the United Kingdom, require a passport valid throughout the period of the intended stay.

In the absence of specific bilateral agreements, countries requiring passports to be valid for at least 6 more months on arrival include Afghanistan, Algeria, Anguilla, Bahrain, Bhutan, Botswana, British Virgin Islands, Brunei, Cambodia, Cameroon, Cape Verde, Cayman Islands, Central African Republic, Chad, Comoros, Costa Rica, Côte d'Ivoire, Curaçao, Ecuador, Egypt, El Salvador, Equatorial Guinea, Fiji, Gabon, Guinea Bissau, Guyana, Haiti, India, Indonesia, Iran, Iraq, Israel, Jordan, Kenya, Kiribati, Kuwait, Laos, Madagascar, Malaysia, Marshall Islands, Mongolia, Myanmar, Namibia, Nepal, Nicaragua, Nigeria, Oman, Palau, Papua New Guinea, Peru, Philippines, Qatar, Rwanda, Samoa, Saudi Arabia, Singapore, Solomon Islands, Somalia, Sri Lanka, Sudan, Suriname, Tanzania, Thailand, Timor-Leste, Tokelau, Tonga, Turkey, Tuvalu, Uganda, United Arab Emirates, Vanuatu, Venezuela, and Vietnam.

Countries requiring passports valid for at least 4 months on arrival include Micronesia and Zambia.

Countries requiring passports with a validity of at least 3 months beyond the date of intended departure include Azerbaijan, Bosnia and Herzegovina, Honduras, Montenegro, Nauru, Moldova and New Zealand. Similarly, the EEA countries of Iceland, Liechtenstein, Norway, all European Union countries (except Ireland) together with Switzerland also require 3 months validity beyond the date of the bearer's intended departure unless the bearer is an EEA or Swiss national.

Countries requiring passports valid for at least 3 months on arrival include Albania, North Macedonia, Panama, and Senegal.

Bermuda requires passports to be valid for at least 45 days upon entry.

Countries that require a passport validity of at least one month beyond the date of intended departure include Eritrea, Hong Kong, Lebanon, Macau, the Maldives and South Africa.

==== Maximum passport age ====
Countries of the Schengen area require non-EU passports to be less than 10 years old upon entry.

=== Criminal record ===
Some countries, including Australia, Canada, Fiji, New Zealand and the United States, routinely deny entry to non-citizens who have a criminal record, while others impose restrictions depending on the type of conviction and the length of the sentence.

=== Persona non grata ===
The government of a country can declare a diplomat persona non grata, banning them from entering the country or expelling them if they have already entered. In non-diplomatic use, the authorities of a country may also declare a foreigner persona non grata permanently or temporarily, usually because of unlawful activity.

=== Israeli stamps ===
Kuwait, Lebanon, Libya, and Yemen do not allow entry to people with passport stamps from Israel or whose passports have either a used or an unused Israeli visa, or where there is evidence of previous travel to Israel such as entry or exit stamps from neighbouring border posts in transit countries such as Jordan and Egypt.

To circumvent this Arab League boycott of Israel, the Israeli immigration services have now mostly ceased to stamp foreign nationals' passports on either entry to or exit from Israel (unless the entry is for some work-related purposes). Since 15 January 2013, Israel no longer stamps foreign passports at Ben Gurion Airport. Passports are still (as of 22 June 2017) stamped at Erez when passing into and out of Gaza.

Iran refuses admission to holders of passports containing an Israeli visa or stamp that is less than 12 months old.

=== Biometrics ===
Several countries mandate that all travellers, or all foreign travellers, be fingerprinted on arrival and will refuse admission to or even arrest travellers who refuse to comply. In some countries, such as the United States, this may apply even to transit passengers who merely wish to change planes rather than go landside.

Fingerprinting countries/regions include Afghanistan, Argentina, Brunei, Cambodia, China, Ethiopia, Ghana, Guinea, India, Japan, Kenya (both fingerprints and a photo are taken), Malaysia upon entry and departure, Mongolia, Saudi Arabia, the Schengen Area, Singapore, South Korea, Taiwan, Thailand, Uganda, the United Arab Emirates and the United States.

Many countries also require a photo be taken of people entering the country. The United States, which does not fully implement exit control formalities at its land frontiers (although long mandated by its own legislation), intends to implement facial recognition for passengers departing from international airports to identify people who overstay their visa.

Together with fingerprint and face recognition, iris scanning is one of three biometric identification technologies internationally standardised since 2006 by the International Civil Aviation Organization (ICAO) for use in e-passports and the United Arab Emirates conducts iris scanning on visitors who need to apply for a visa. The United States Department of Homeland Security has announced plans to greatly increase the biometric data it collects at US borders. In 2018, Singapore began trials of iris scanning at three land and maritime immigration checkpoints.

== Consular protection of Norwegian citizens abroad ==
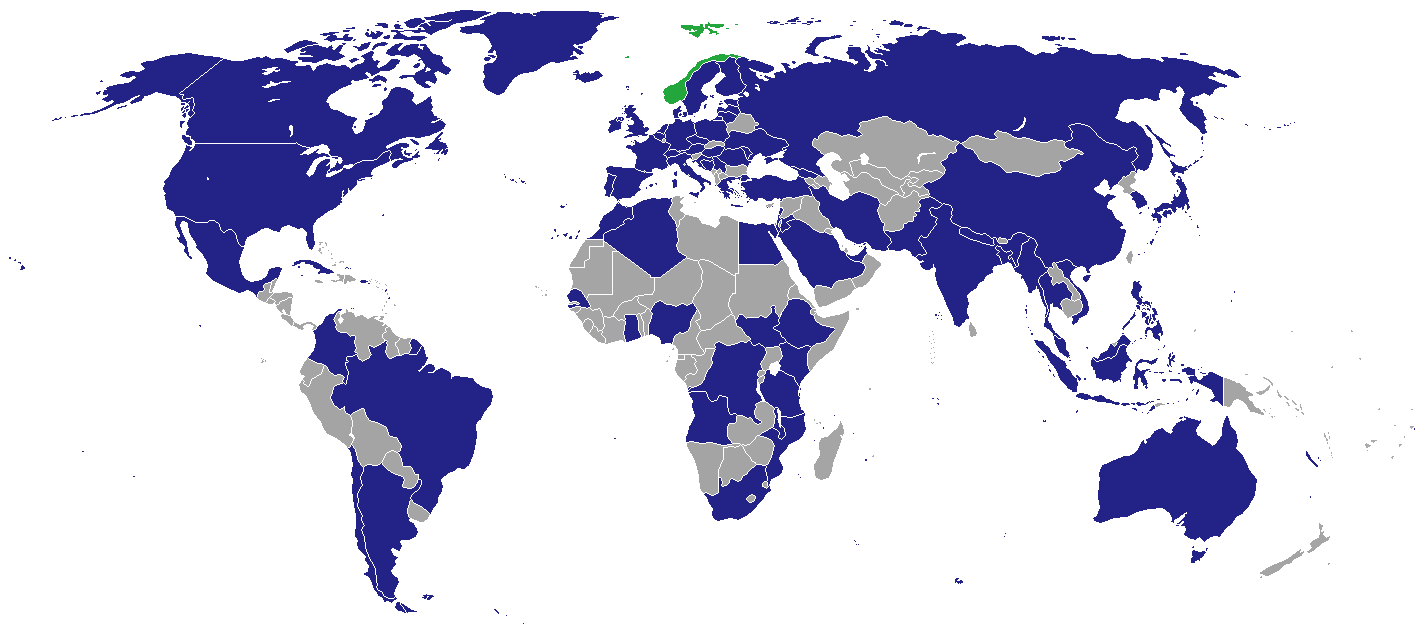
Diplomatic missions of Norway

When in a country with no Norwegian representation, Norwegian citizens may seek assistance from public officials in the foreign services of any of the Nordic countries. This is afforded by the Helsinki Treaty which states that public officials in the foreign services of any of the Nordic countries shall assist citizens of another Nordic country if that country is not represented in the territory concerned.

== See also ==
- Norwegian passport
- Norwegian identity card
- Visa requirements for EFTA nationals
- Visa policy of the Schengen Area
