= Charles Philipson =

Norwegian civil servant

- Born: 5 October 1928
- Died: 26 September 1990 (aged 61)
- Education: Master of Law
- Alma mater: Harvard Law School
- Occupations: Judge and civil servant

Charles Philipson (5 October 1928 – 26 September 1990) was a Norwegian jurist, civil servant (acting Consumer Ombudsman, and director of the Norwegian Competition Authority), and Supreme Court justice.

== Career ==
Philipson graduated as jurist in 1952. From 1952 to 1953 he was assigned secretary in the Norwegian Price Directorate, and was then assistant judge in Lier, Røyken and Hurum. He then conducted further studies at Harvard Law School, graduating as Master of Laws. From 1958 to 1972 he was appointed at the Office of the Attorney General of Norway, from 1961 barrister with access to working with Supreme Court cases. In 1973 he was appointed judge at Oslo District Court. He served as acting Consumer Ombudsman from 1974 to 1975. In 1976 he was back at Oslo District Court, and was then appointed director of the Norwegian Competition Authority from 1977 to 1983. He was appointed Supreme Court justice in 1984, and held this position until his death in 1990.

Philipson was a member of a number of law commissions, including chairman of the 1972 petroleum law commission, and the 1975 commission on provisional detention.

== Early and personal life ==
Philipson was born on 5 October 1928 to Jewish immigrants to Norway, Maja and Jakob Philipson. He grew up in Oslo. On 26 November 1942, during the German occupation of Norway, he narrowly escaped being sent to German extermination camps, as the cab with him and other family members arrived too late to the harbour to board SS Donau, which on this occasion transported more than 500 Jewish prisoners to Stettin, where they were brought further with train to Auschwitz. Soon after this Philipson and his family escaped to Sweden with assistance by the refugee operation Carl Fredriksens Transport, arriving in Sweden on 4 December. He attended a secondary school in Uppsala, and passed examen artium in Norway in 1947.

Civic offices
Preceded by Inger Louise Valle	Norwegian Consumer Ombudsman (acting); 1974–1975	Succeeded by Hans Petter Lundgaard
Government offices
Preceded by Rolf Semmingsen	Director of the Norwegian Competition Authority; 1977–1983	Succeeded by Egil Bakke
