= Spurkeland =

Spurkeland is a Norwegian surname. Notable people with the surname include:

- Charlotte Spurkeland (born 1987), Norwegian politician
- Thor Jørgen Spurkeland (born 1987), Norwegian footballer
