= Knut Eggum Johansen =

Norwegian civil servant (born 1943)

Knut Eggum Johansen (born 25 September 1943) was a Norwegian civil servant.

He was born in Bodø, and graduated as cand.oecon. from the University of Oslo in 1979. He made a career in the Ministry of Finance, being promoted to deputy under-secretary of state in 1990. Since 1999 he serves as director of the Norwegian Competition Authority. In 2011 he is succeeded by Christine B. Meyer.

Government offices
Preceded by Einar Hope	Director of the Norwegian Competition Authority; 1999–present	Incumbent
