= Egil Bakke =

Norwegian civil servant (1927–2022)

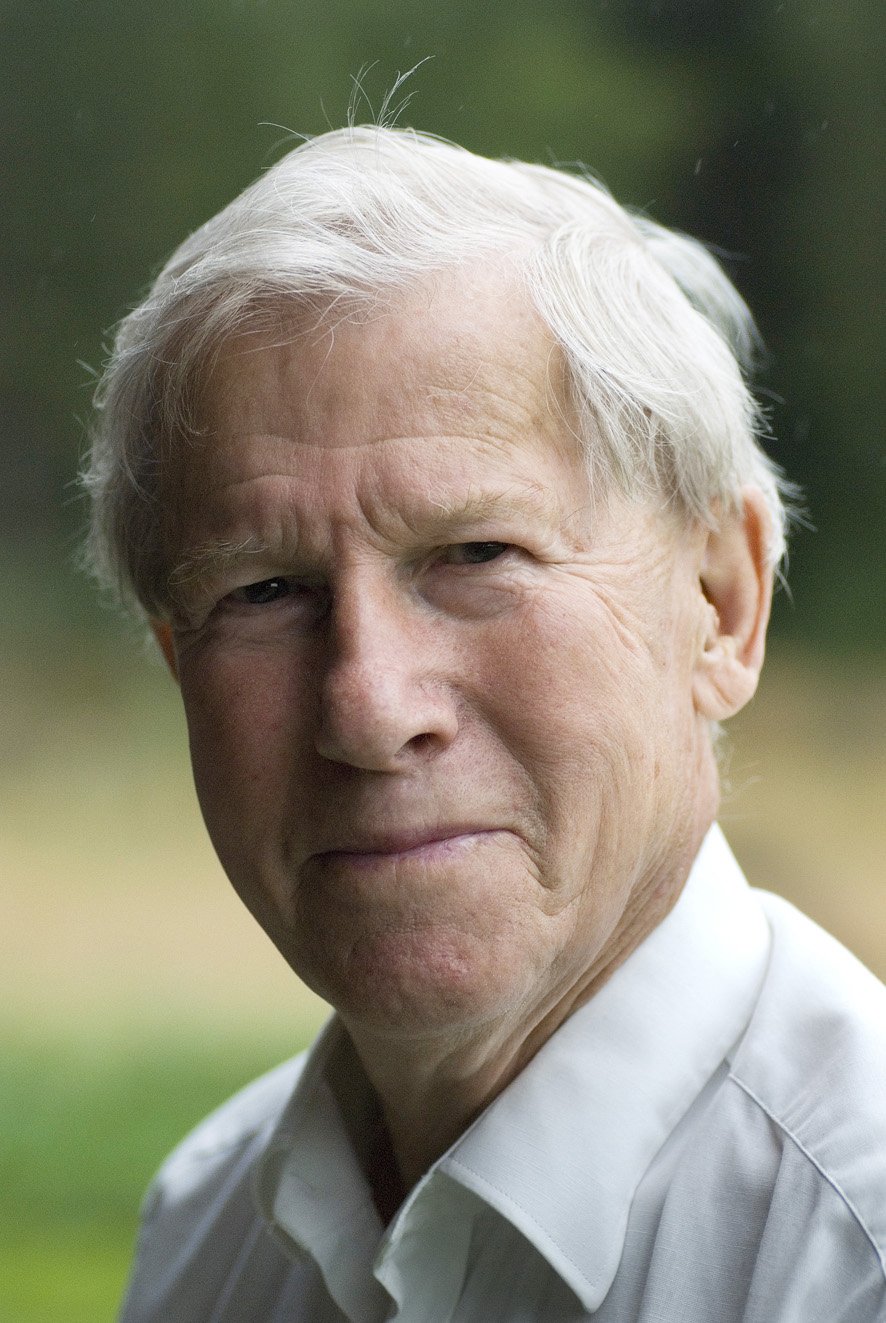
Image of Egil Bakke

Egil Bakke (27 September 1927 – 16 July 2022) was a Norwegian civil servant.

== Life and career ==
Egil Bakke was born in Horten. Having graduated as cand.oecon. (master in economics), he worked in the Ministry of Finance from 1954 to 1971, in the Ministry of Consumer Affairs and Administration from 1972 to 1974 and in the Federation of Norwegian Industries (a precursor to the Confederation of Norwegian Enterprise) from 1974 to 1983. From 1983 to 1995 he served as director of the Norwegian Price Directorate. In 1994 the Norwegian Price Directorate was restructured as the Norwegian Competition Authority.

Bakke died on 16 July 2022, at the age of 94.

Civic offices
Preceded by Charles Philipson	Director of the Norwegian Price Directorate; 1983–1995	Succeeded by Einar Hope
Non-profit organization positions
Preceded by Kjeld Rimberg	Chairman of the Norwegian Polytechnic Society; 1991–1993	Succeeded by Rolf Skår
