= Einar Hope =

Norwegian economist (born 1937)

Einar Hope (born 13 July 1937) is a Norwegian economist.

He was born in Masfjorden Municipality. Having graduated as siviløkonom, he was employed at the Norwegian School of Economics and Business Administration from 1978 to 1990, before being CEO of the Foundation for Research in Economics and Business Administration from 1991 to 1995. From 1995 to 1999 he served as director of the Norwegian Competition Authority. From 1999 to 2005 he was professor of energy economics at the Norwegian School of Economics and Business Administration. He is a fellow of the Norwegian Academy of Technological Sciences.

He is the brother of Bjarne Johannes Hope.

Government offices
Preceded by Egil Bakke	Director of the Norwegian Competition Authority; 1983–1995	Succeeded by Knut Eggum Johansen
