= Harald Victor Hove =

Norwegian politician (born 1983)

Harald Victor Hove (born 25 February 1983) is a Norwegian politician for the Conservative Party.

He served as a deputy representative to the Parliament of Norway from Hordaland during the terms 2005–2009 and 2009–2013. In total he met during 19 days of parliamentary session.

Political offices
Preceded by Henning Warloe	Bergen City Commissioner of Finance; 2009–2010	Succeeded by Liv Røssland
Preceded by Monica Mæland	Bergen City Commissioner of Culture; 2010–2011	Succeeded by Gunnar Bakke
Preceded by Filip Rygg	Bergen City Commissioner of Education; 2011–2014	Succeeded by Charlotte Spurkeland (acting)
