= Driving licence in Norway =

Norwegian driving licence
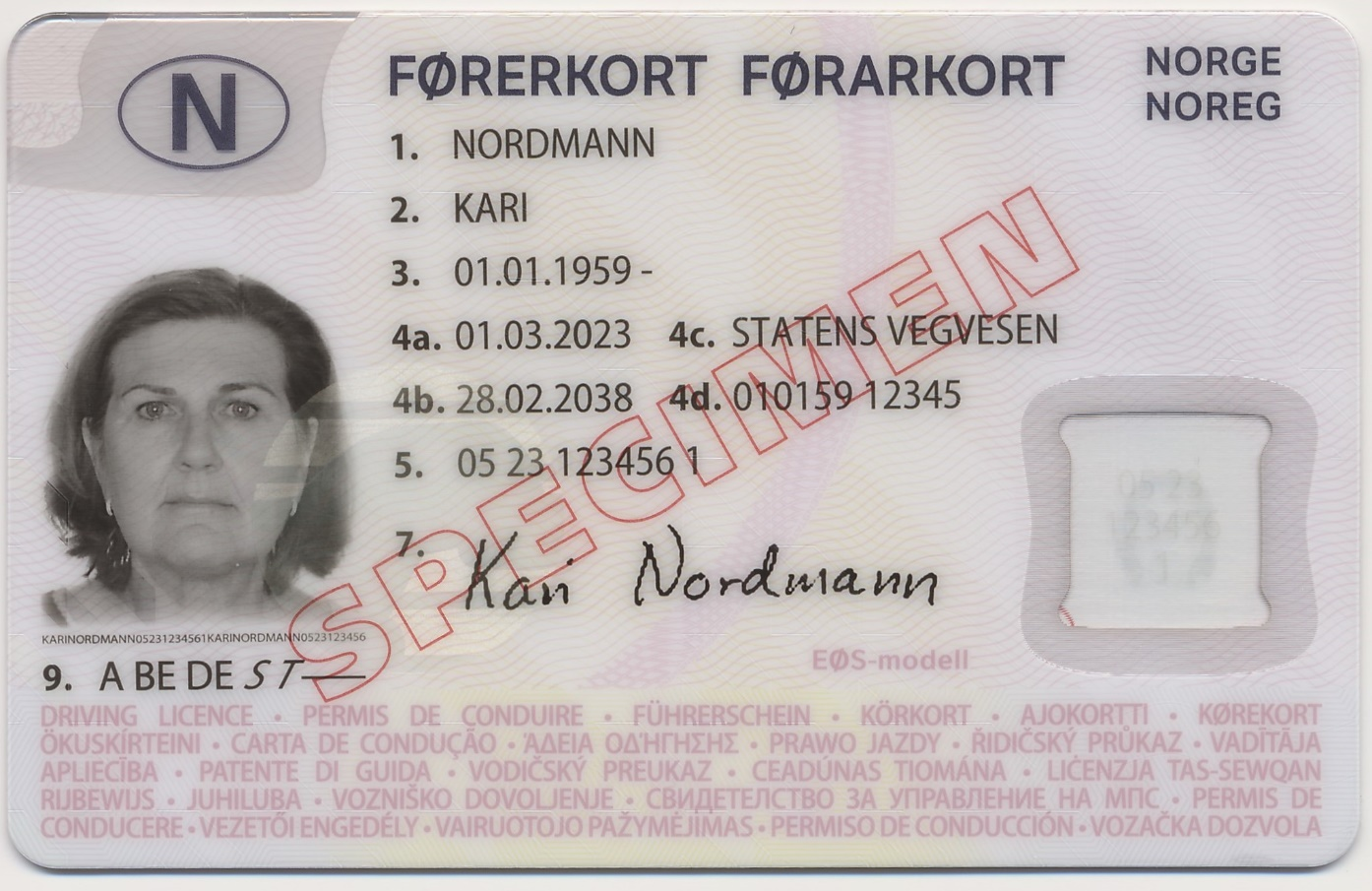
- The front of a Norwegian driving licence issued after 2022.

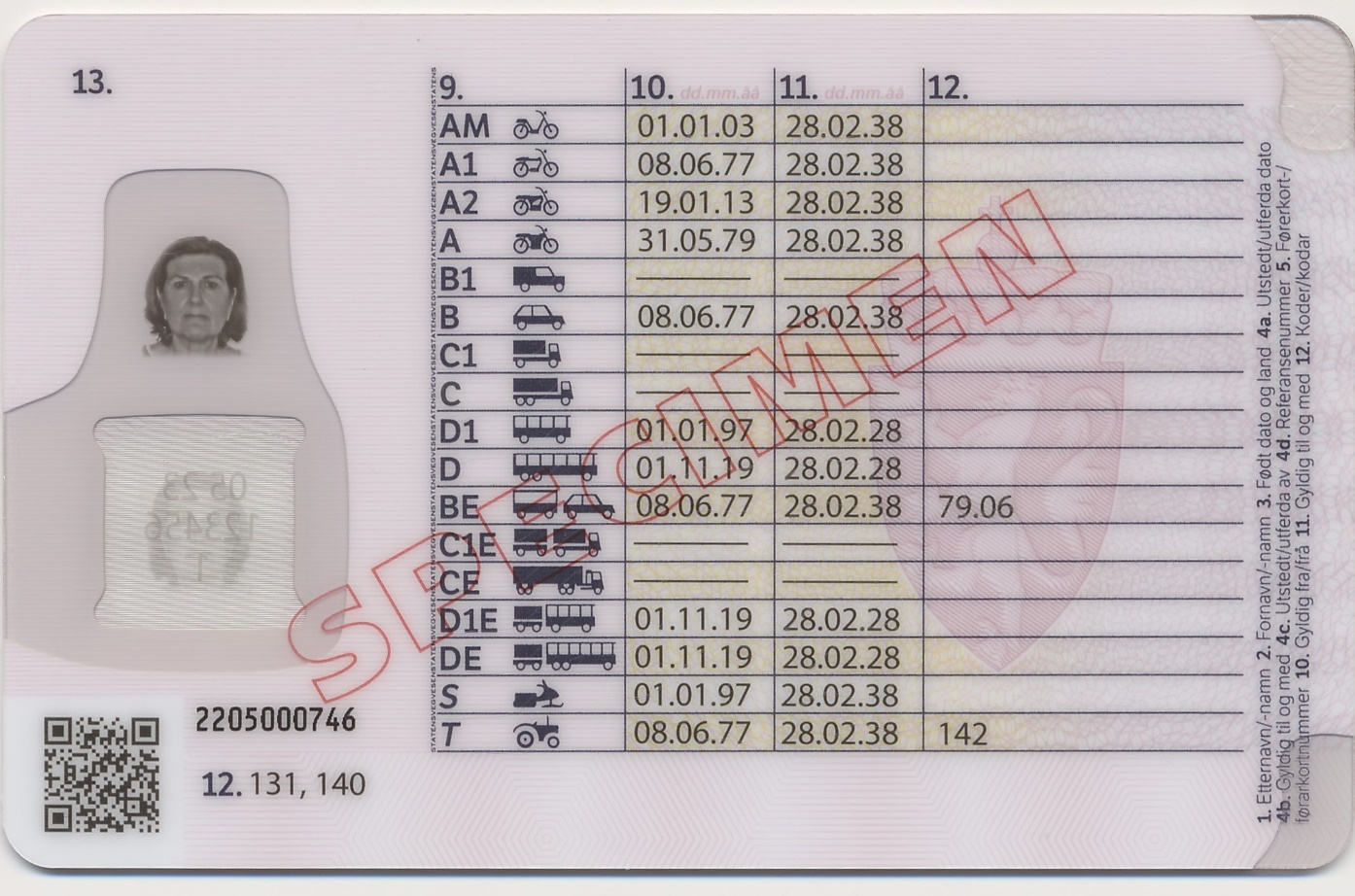
- The back of the driving licence issued after 2022.
- Type: Driving licence
- Issued by: Norway
- Purpose: Identification
- Valid in: Norway; Europe
- Cost: Up to ≈NOK 30,000 (Driving licence issue fee only: NOK 290)

Norwegian driving licences (Bokmål: Førerkort, Nynorsk: Førarkort) adhere to a standard set in the European Economic Area.

== Validity and renewal ==
Before April 1979, Norwegian driving licences were a small book. Between 1979 and 1997 it was a plastic laminated, pink paper. These models are still valid in Norway, but are usually not valid abroad. From 1998, there is a model that follows EEA rules. From 2013, they are valid for 15 years, while cards produced before 2013 have no indicated time limit. Still, licences issued before 1998 were made invalid in 2022, and licences issued between 1998 and 2013 will be invalid in 2033.

Driving licences which expire or get invalid can be replaced with a new document. People who are over 80 years old or having a licence for heavy vehicles must get a health certificate to be able to renew.

== Obtaining a driving licence ==
For the drivers to be eligible to apply for a licence for cars (category B), the minimum age is 18 years. The minimum age for mopeds (category AM146; 50 cc, max 45 km/h), smaller motorcycles (category A1; engine capacity equal to, or less than 125 cubic centimetres) and tractors (category T) is 16 years. Most larger truck licences require the holder to be 21 years old (category C). Motorcycles have different rules, drivers can drive a motorcycle with up to 35 kW from the age of 18 (category A2), as long as the student have completed the necessary courses and tests. When the student turns 20, the student can take a course for motorcycles with unlimited power (category A) assuming they have the A2 licence since the age of 18. Before the driver is 24, they have to have at least 2 years experience with smaller motorcycles.

=== Driver training ===
Before one is allowed to practise for any driving licence, one must first complete a four-day class called trafikalt grunnkurs (basic traffic course) which covers the basic rules of the road, some general advice, and what to do when involved in (or present at the scene of) an accident—including how to communicate effectively with emergency services and basic first aid skills (ABC, recovery position). Students over 25 years of age are exempt from most parts of the basic traffic course, and therefore they can begin practise driving without taking the class. However, if they want to drive during times after sunset, they have to take a part of the basic traffic course called mørkekjøring (driving in dark conditions).

Anyone having completed this class and no less than two years younger than the minimum age for the desired licence is allowed to practise drive for that licence if accompanied by a parent or other adult who is at least 25 years old and has had the relevant licence without interruption for the past five years. For example, when the student is 16 years old, they can begin driving training for category B after they completed the class. Some driving schools offer basic training on how to effectively coach a learning driver, but this training is not compulsory.

During practise driving, an L-plate must be affixed behind the car, or on the back of the reflective vest for motorcycles and mopeds. However, if practise driving is being done by licensed instructor, the L-plate is replaced by the black text "Skole" ("School") on white background.

In addition for cars, an additional rear-view mirror used by accompanying adult is also required. For motorcycles and mopeds, they must be able to communicate each other with two-way intercom or mobile phone through headset.

Drivers must also take courses with a licensed instructor in night driving, slippery road driving in an obstacle course, first aid, and four obligatory driving hours each covering different aspects of traffic. One of those is long-distance driving on country roads, another is city driving with roundabouts.

=== Theory test ===
After the student applies for the driving licence to Norwegian Public Roads Administration (Norwegian: Statens Vegvesen), the student must undergo theory test before taking practical test at Vegvesen's Driver and Vehicle Licensing Office (Norwegian: Trafikkstasjon). Before the theory test is taken for the first time, they must do a simple eye exam. The theory test for category B (cars) consists of 45 questions and each question has one correct answer. The student must answer all questions and 85% of correct answers (up to seven wrong answers) will pass this test. After this test is passed, the student must pass the practical test within three years after completion, or the student must retake the test. If the student fails the test, they must wait two weeks before retaking the test.

=== Practical test ===
If the student has succeeded the theory test and all obligatory training courses has been completed, the student takes the practical test before obtaining the licence. The test consists of several parts, including safety check with the vehicle before the start of the journey and parking at the end of the journey. The student is legally considered as driver and they are responsible what they have to do during the test. Once the test is ended, the examiner will tell them they've passed or failed the test. If they pass this test, they will be photographed and pay for licence issue fee. They can choose either to be mailed on their registered address, or to be picked up at the office. If they chose to pick it up at the office, the licence must be picked up within five years. If they fail the test, they must wait four weeks before retaking the test and reason for the failure is written.

=== After the licence is obtained ===
When the driver first gets their licence they get what is called a trial licence which is a 2-year trial period during which the number of points they will receive is doubled for each traffic violations, making it easier to lose their licence. If the driver loses their licence during this period, they have to retake all the tests, both theoretically and practically after the suspension period is expired. If the driver loses their licence after the 2-year trial, they will receive the licence by mail when it is reissued to their address after the suspension period is expired.

== Point system ==
Since January 1, 2004, the point system (Norwegian: Prikkbelastning) is used by Norwegian authorities to handle traffic offenders. Two points will be issued for most violations except for in the smallest speeding cases. If eight points or more are issued during a three-year period, the driving licence is temporarily suspended, usually for six months. All points will be removed three years after the first point was received in this period. If the licence is reissued after the suspension period, all points are removed immediately.

== Digital driving licence ==
On 1 October 2019, Norway became the first country in Europe to introduce a digital driving licence. A holder of a Norwegian driving licence can request a digital version of their physical driving licence after downloading the app Førerkort from their preferred app marketplace. The applicant must verify their identity with BankID upon logging in on the app for the first time, which will then retrieve information from the national database for driving licences. After this procedure, the digital driving licence will display the exact same information as on the physical driving licence. The app only allows one phone with a digital driving licence per user.

If the holder has recently passed their driving exam or upgraded to a new category, and hence awaiting to receive their physical driving licence, the app will display a temporary driving permit. When the physical driving licence has been produced, the app is able to display the holder's digital driving licence, regardless if the holder has received their physical driving licence by mail yet or not. If a holder's driving licence has been revoked or suspended, this information will be displayed in the app as long as the holder has not gotten their driving licence back.

Upon a traffic stop by the police or coming in contact with the Public Roads Administration, the digital driving licence is valid as a proof of identification. Although the driving licence contains a QR code which can be scanned by either government authorities, commercial establishments or even private persons to verify the details, it is not considered as a proof of identification in most places. The digital driving licence is not valid outside of Norway.

== Cost ==
In Norway it is not unusual to end up paying 25,000 to 30,000 NOK (≈4,000 USD as of December 2014) for a driving licence. This is owing to the vast number of courses required.

== Drunk Driving Penalties ==
Norway enforces one of the strictest drunk driving regimes in Europe, with a deeply low legal blood alcohol concentration (BAC) limit of 0.02% (0.2 g/L) for all drivers. Stricter thresholds mean that even very modest alcohol consumption can lead to serious consequences.

Penalties escalate based on BAC levels and may involve fines, licence suspension or withdrawal, and in severe cases, imprisonment — with both criminal and administrative sanctions potentially applied together. The fines themselves are proportional to the offender’s gross monthly salary. For a BAC between 0.2 and 0.5 g/L, penalties can include a fine equivalent to one month’s salary, and a driving ban of up to six months, though imprisonment is generally not imposed at this level. For BAC levels between 0.51 and 1.2 g/L, fines typically rise to 1.5 months’ salary, combined with 12 to 24 months of driving prohibition, along with either a conditional or unconditional prison sentence. If BAC exceeds 1.21 g/L, offenders face a substantial fine (around 1.5 months’ salary), a minimum 21-day unconditional prison sentence, and a multi-year licence suspension.

A temporary confiscation of the driver’s licence by police often occurs at the scene pending legal proceedings. In cases resulting in permanent revocation of the licence, reapplication is only possible after five years, including taking both theory and practical driving tests anew.

These stringent measures — including the low BAC limit, income-based fines, combined suspensions, and custodial sentencesare reflective of Norway’s zero-tolerance policy toward impaired driving. The regulations are designed not only to punish, but also to deter, thereby promoting overall road safety.

== See also ==
- European driving licence
- Driving Licence
- Norwegian identity card
- European Commissioner for Transport
- International driving licence
- Datakortet
