= Norwegian identity card =

National identity card of Norway

Norwegian identity card ID-kort (Norwegian) ID-duođaštus (Northern Sami)
- ID card with travel rights

- ID card without travel rights
- Type: Identity card; travel document (travel-enabled version only)
- Issued by: Norway; Norwegian Police Service
- First issued: 30 November 2020 (first version); 29 July 2021 (second version); 7 November 2024 (current version)
- In circulation: 1.2 million
- Purpose: Identification; travel (travel-enabled version only)
- Valid in: Without travel rights: Norway only. With travel rights: EFTA; European Union; United Kingdom (Pre-Settled or Settled status); Rest of Europe (except Belarus, Russia, and Ukraine) Greenland; Overseas France
- Eligibility: Norwegian citizens; eligible foreign nationals with a Norwegian national identity number (non-travel version only)
- Expiration: 5 years (adults and children aged 10 or older); 3 years (children aged 5–9); 2 years (children aged 0–4); For third-country nationals with temporary residence permits or residence rights under section 114 of the Immigration Act, the card normally expires on the same date as the residence card.
- Cost: NOK 840 (adults and children aged 10 or older); NOK 510 (children under 10)

The Norwegian identity card, commonly referred to as the national identity card (Norwegian: nasjonalt ID-kort, Northern Sami: ID-duođaštus) in Norway, is a non-compulsory biometric identity document issued since 30 November 2020. It is one of two official identity documents issued by the Norwegian Police Service, the other being the Norwegian passport.

It is issued to Norwegian citizens as a travel document and may indicate citizenship to facilitate freedom of movement within the European Free Trade Association (EFTA) and the European Economic Area (EEA), as well as eligible foreign nationals, including third-country (Non-EU/EEA/EFTA) nationals, who can obtain the version without travel rights for identification within Norway.

For travel within the Nordic countries no identity documentation is legally required for Nordic citizens due to the Nordic Passport Union.

== History ==
=== Earlier ID cards ===
During the Second World War, the authorities issued a mandatory identity card. This card was abandoned after the end of the war, as it was strongly associated with the occupation force and its control regime.

Norway Post started issuing a photo identity card on 1 March 1957, initially free for all residents over 15 years old. These were intended for use at the post offices, but were quickly adopted by other public and private instances as a valid photo ID. For several decades these were along with passports and driver's licenses the only widely recognized ID in Norwegian society. During the 1970s the postal ID cards were the only valid IDs for proving age on public transport.

Bank cards were launched in 1977, originally only serving as an ID card. These were intended for a clerk to be able to verify the identity of the person writing the check. By the 1980s the cards were used as debit cards, and even after checks were phased out of common use in the early 1990s, the bank cards retained a photo ID, including the national identity number of the person. The widespread use of bank cards as ID gradually led to the termination of postal ID cards. Legally, bank cards are a customer card which serves no particular legal purpose. However, because of the stringent requirements needed to verify one's identity to the bank in order to open an account and be issued a bank card, bank cards became widely accepted as ID cards, even at public institutions.

The banking sector was strongly in favor of replacing bank card-based IDs with government-issued IDs. Banks had no obligation to issue IDs. One issue was that the banks bore the cost of issuing the IDs. The other was that the banks did not have the same ability to authenticate people with confidence as government authorities, increasing the risk of fake IDs being issued. With the announcement of the National ID Card plans, a number of banks stopped issuing ID fields on their bank cards.

=== Need for a new ID card system ===
By the mid-2000s the situation had become untenable, with no generic, government-issued ID card available. Postal ID cards were phased out, banks were wanting to rid themselves of their obligation, passports could only be issued to Norwegian citizens and driver's licenses were restricted to those with the right to drive motor vehicles. Some people were left using their passports as their only valid ID. Certain group of immigrants were not able to acquire IDs altogether. Non-Norwegian citizens could not be issued passports, and without a government-issued ID card which showed their national identity number, they were unable to open a bank account. This further hindered them from getting jobs, as Norwegian anti-money laundering laws require wages to be paid to a bank account. The situation was exacerbated by Norway at the time not allowing multiple citizenship, which discouraged many foreigners who were long-term residents to apply for Norwegian citizenship.

Another issue was the lack of a government-issued eID. Banking, most private and eGovernment services relied heavily on private eID services, the most common being the bank-issued BankID. NorSIS stated that this was problematic because the government had no way of directly issuing eID with sufficiently high security levels. This largely effected the same people as were not able to open bank accounts, since holding a valid bank account had become the de facto means of acquiring an eID. NorSIS was also concerned that the quality of authentication issued by banks was inferior to that carried out by the police, which could lead to more fake IDs. Additionally, it was possible for an impostor to receive an eID for another person, without the victim having knowledge of the eID being issued. NorSIS recommended that all residents and other people in the National Population Register be issued a root eID from the government, as part of an ID card, and that other eID use these root eIDs as the basis for their verification.

=== Development and introduction ===
Norway decided in 2007 to introduce a voluntary national identity card, to be usable for travel to EEA countries. They were since delayed until introduced on 30 November 2020. The reason for the delay was that the responsible authorities required absolute security on both the cards and the validation of the identity at issuance, issuing new security requirements repeatedly.

The entire implementation cost, including development and upgrades to the passport offices, for the combined ID card and passport project, had reached 596 million Norwegian krone by 2018. 120 million of this was the cost of rebuilding the passport offices.

Earlier versions of the ID card with travel rights

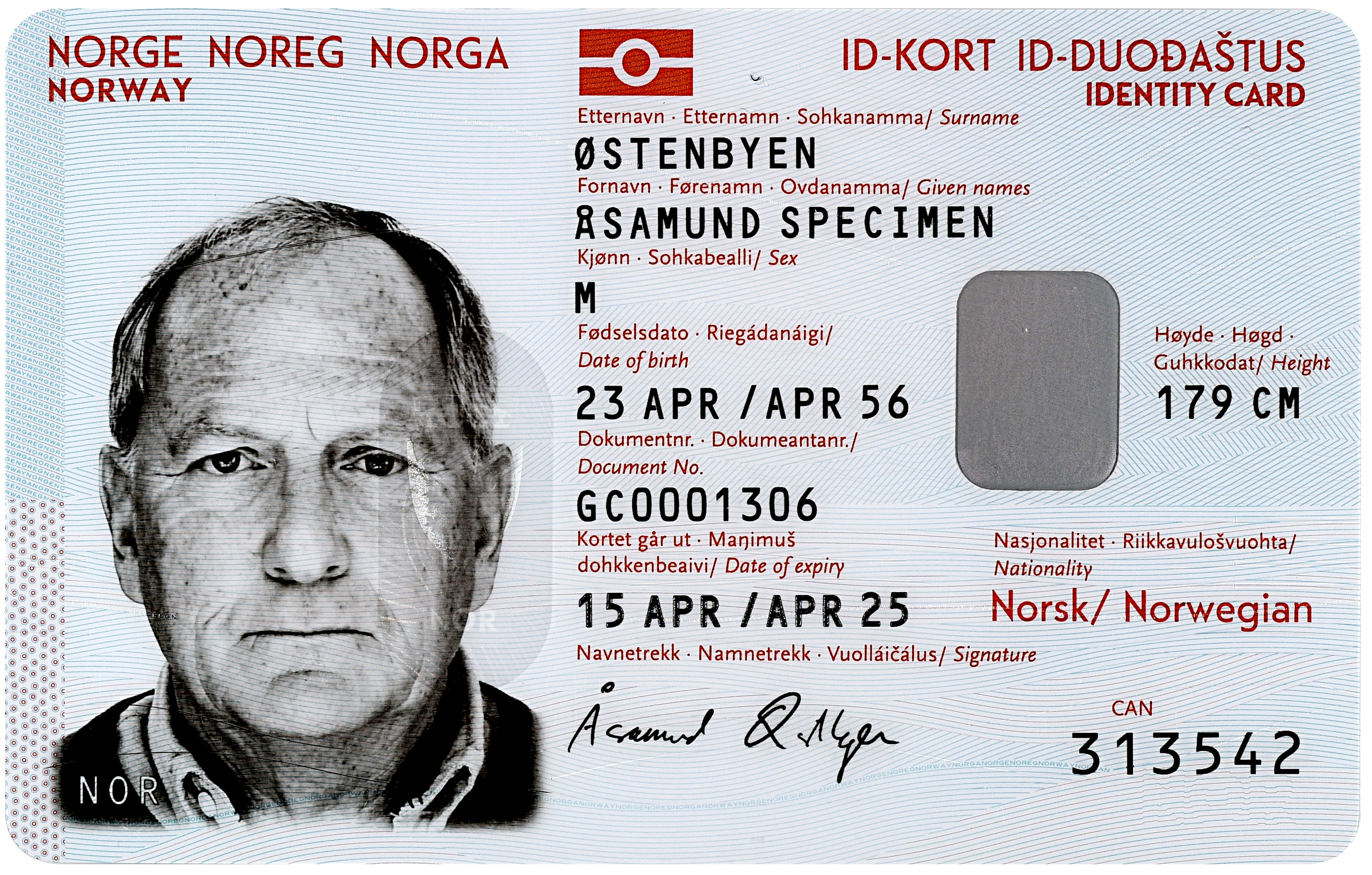
First version (2020)

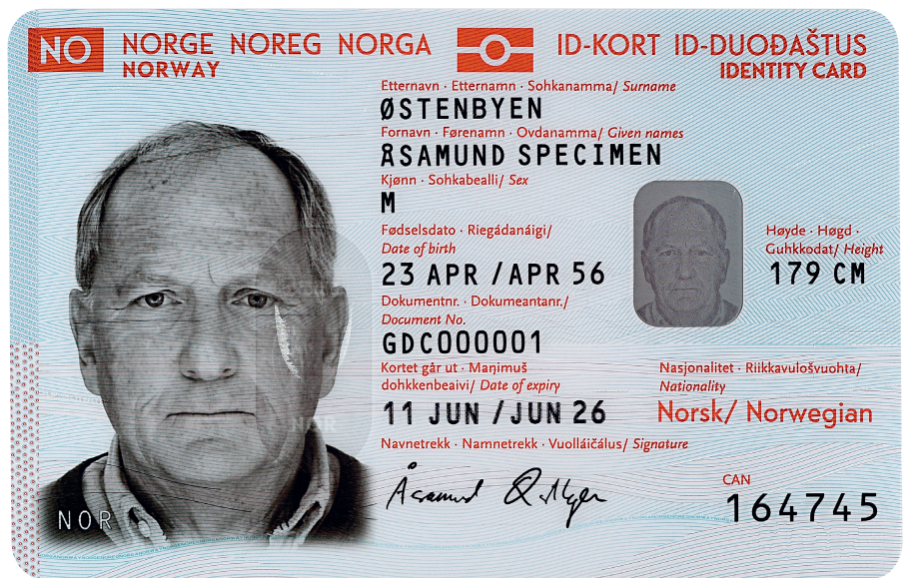
Second version (2021)

On 3 March 2022, the Ministry of Justice and Public Security launched a public consultation on extending eligibility for national identity cards without travel rights to foreign nationals with a residence permit or right of residence in Norway for more than three months.

From 2 August 2021, the various identity card styles currently in use in the EU became standardized through Regulation 2019/1157, which was later replaced by Council Regulation (EU) 2025/1208. On 1 February 2024, through incorporation into the EEA agreement, Norway, Iceland and Liechtenstein became bound by the Regulation with some amendments, including the lack of a requirement of an EU flag. (Note: The legal acquis has been identified as EEA-relevant by the EU Commission, which makes it under scrutiny for incorporation into the EEA Agreement by Iceland, Liechtenstein and Norway. However, the legal basis rely on Article 21 of the Treaty on the Functioning of the European Union, an article which is not reflected in the EEA Agreement.) Nevertheless, Norwegian identity cards have already been compliant with the Regulation since July 2021.

With the introduction of the National ID Card, a number of major banks announced that they would be discontinuing the ID section on bank cards. Some stated that bank card ID would be an opt-in for their customers, while others stopped offering IDs entirely. An all-out retirement of bank card IDs may happen at a future date, once the National ID Cards have been fully implemented.

By February 2024 around 1.2 million Norwegian ID cards had been issued since their introduction in November 2020.

There has been trouble because the card was initially less well known in Norway and therefore not accepted. For example, airlines has occasionally (due to a lack of staff training) not accepted it for flights from Norway to other Schengen countries.

On 1 April 2025, applications for national identity cards without travel rights opened to eligible nationals of EEA and EFTA countries with a Norwegian national identity number.

On 1 September 2026, applications opened to eligible third-country nationals, initially only at the police public service centre in Ski. The police announced plans to extend the service to additional passport and ID offices across Norway by the end of 2026.

== Issue ==
ID cards are issued by the Norwegian Police Service. The issuing of ID cards uses the same framework as for issuing Norwegian passports and the two can be issued as part of the same transaction. There are 77 police stations equipped to issue passports and ID cards, and many smaller police stations no longer issue passports. This has been enacted to improve the quality of authenticating people and reducing the chance of false documentation being issued, in part due to a 2015 report from the Office of the Auditor General that showed lack of security measures related to issuing passports.

=== Foreign nationals ===
Third-country applicants must have a Norwegian national identity number and a valid Norwegian residence card, and must meet the police's identity-verification requirements. Applicants who have only a D-number are not eligible. The national identity card serves as identification and is distinct from the residence card, which documents permission to reside in Norway.

== Travel document ==
Countries and regions which the Norwegian identity card is valid.

Only the version with travel rights can be used as a travel document. Cards issued to foreign nationals are valid for identification within Norway only and cannot be used for international travel.

As a member of EFTA, Norwegian citizens have freedom of movement to live and work in other EFTA countries in accordance with the EFTA convention. Moreover, by virtue of Norway's membership of the European Economic Area, Norwegian citizens also have freedom of movement to live and work across all EEA member states.

As an alternative to presenting a passport, Norwegian citizens are entitled to use a valid national identity card to exercise their right of free movement in EFTA and the European Economic Area. Strictly speaking, it is not necessary for an EEA or Swiss citizen to possess a valid national identity card or passport to enter the EEA and Switzerland. In theory, if an EEA or Swiss citizen can prove their nationality by any other means (e.g. by presenting an expired national identity card or passport, or a citizenship certificate), they must be permitted to enter the EEA and Switzerland. An EEA or Swiss citizen who is unable to demonstrate their nationality satisfactorily must, nonetheless, be given 'every reasonable opportunity' to obtain the necessary documents or to have them delivered within a reasonable period of time.

Furthermore, the card can be used as a travel document to European Microstates, Balkan countries, French Overseas Territories and Montserrat (for max. 14 days). Until 30 September 2021, the United Kingdom accepted the card as well. Since then, the UK and the Crown Dependencies only allows EU/EEA and Swiss citizens fulfilling specific requirements, or entering the UK at the Ireland-Northern Ireland land border, to use national identity cards, until at least 31 December 2025.

For travel within the Nordic countries no identity documentation is legally required for Nordic citizens due to the Nordic Passport Union, but one must be able to prove their citizenship by acceptable means, which in reality means that identity documentation is needed. A difference to EU rules is that driver's license is accepted for this, but often not bank IDs. Temporary passport controls since 2015 from Denmark into Norway and Sweden have only accepted passport, national identity card and driver's license.

== Characteristics ==
Two variants of the ID card exists. National ID cards with travel rights can be used as identification and as a travel document within the EEA and Switzerland. National ID cards without travel rights are only valid for identification purposes.

- The version valid as a travel document has red text and a document number starting with GD from 29 July 2021, the previous version started with GC. The machine readable zone, printed on the reverse-side of the card starts with CA.
- The version not valid as a travel document has green text and a document number starting with JGD since 29 July 2021, the previous version started with JG only. The machine readable zone, printed on the reverse-side of the card starts with XA. It is also denoted as "Not intended for use outside Norway" in the place of the holder's nationality.

The identity cards are 85 × 54 millimetres in size. In the top left, the name Norway is written in the two forms of Norwegian; Bokmål and Nynorsk and Northern Sami "NORGE NOREG NORGA" and below that, in smaller letters in English "NORWAY", and in the top right part of the card the words "ID-KORT ID-DUOĐAŠTUS" is placed above the English word "IDENTITY CARD" (in smaller letters). On the card valid for travel, the two-letter country code "NO" inside a red rectangle has been added to the left of the country name. The biometric passport symbol is placed in the middle.

=== Printed data ===
The descriptions of the fields are printed in Bokmål, Nynorsk, Northern Sámi and English.

- Surname
- Given names
- Sex
- Date of birth
- Height
- Document number
- Date of expiry
- Nationality (only on card with travel rights, on the green version without travel rights the words "Not intended for use outside Norway" is printed instead)
- Signature
- CAN

=== Chip ===
The Norwegian identity card contains a contactless chip compliant with ICAO 9303. Both the version with travel rights and the version without travel rights have electronically readable chips. Information on the chip can be accessed using the card access number (CAN) printed on the front or the machine-readable zone (MRZ) on the reverse. The chip contains a colour photograph of the holder measuring 446 × 580 pixels, encoded in JPEG 2000.

All three versions, introduced in 2020, 2021 and 2024, use the following optional data elements:

- Data group 11:
  - 01: The holder's full name, encoded in UTF-8. The name may contain Norwegian characters and is not truncated on the chip, even if truncated on the printed card.
  - 03: The holder's Norwegian identification number, stored without spaces or separators.
- Data group 12:
  - 02: Date of issue (YYYYMMDD).
  - 08: Date and time of manufacturing (2020 and 2021 versions) or personalisation (2024 version), in YYYYMMDDHHMMSS format.
  - 09: Identifier.

The content of data group 12, element 04, differs between versions:

- 2020 and 2021 versions: Element 04 contains the text "Not valid as a travel document" on the green card without travel rights only.
- 2024 version: Element 04 contains information about the official control guide and instructions for returning a found card to the police or a Norwegian embassy on the red card with travel rights. On the green card without travel rights, it contains a notice stating that the card is not intended for use outside Norway, together with a reference to the official control guide.

== See also ==
- National identity cards in the European Economic Area and Switzerland
- Norwegian nationality law
- Visa requirements for Norwegian citizens
- Norwegian passport
