= Norwegian passport =

Passport issued to Norwegian citizens

Norwegian passport; Norsk pass Norgga pássa
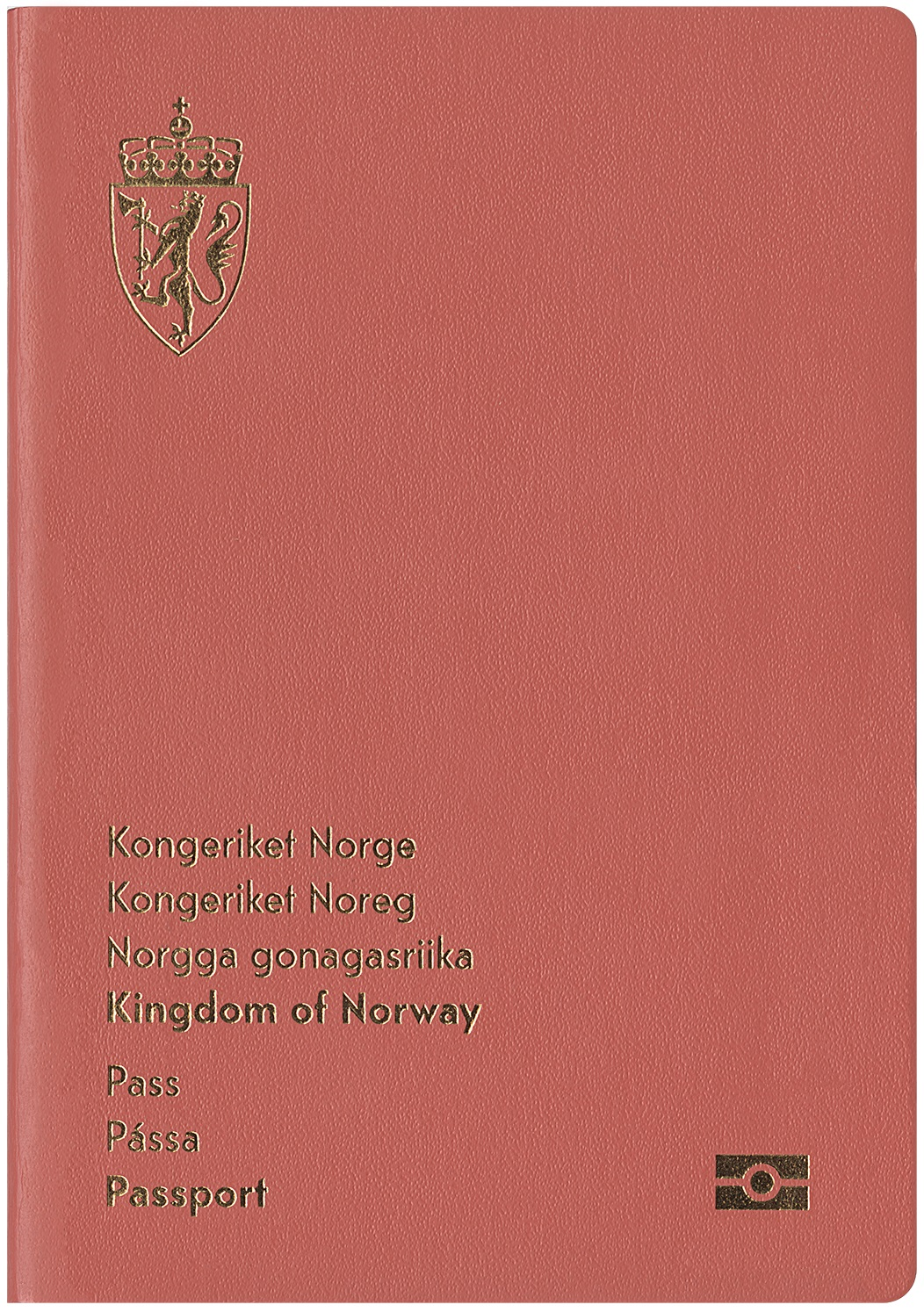
- The front cover of a contemporary Norwegian biometric passport

- Norwegian ePassport information page
- Type: Passport
- Issued by: (Norway) Norwegian Police Service
- First issued: 1 October 2005 (first biometric version); 19 January 2015 (second biometric version); 19 October 2020 (third biometric version); 20 January 2026 (current version)
- Purpose: Identification
- Eligibility: Norwegian citizenship
- Expiration: 2 years for children up to the age of 5; 3 years for children up to the age of 10; 5 years for individuals aged 10–16; and 10 years for individuals aged 16 and older
- Cost: 840 NOK (over 16) / 510 NOK (under 16). 20% discount if applied for at the same time as a National ID Card

A Norwegian passport (Norwegian: norsk pass, Northern Sami: norgga pássa) is the passport issued to nationals of Norway for the purpose of international travel. Beside serving as proof of Norwegian citizenship, they facilitate the process of securing assistance from Norwegian consular officials abroad (or public officials in the mission of another Nordic country in case a Norwegian consular official is absent).

The passport, along with the national identity card allows for the freedom of movement in any of the states of the European Free Trade Association and the European Economic Area. This is because Norway is a member state of EFTA, and by virtue of it also being a member of the EEA and part of the Schengen Area. For travel within the Nordic countries no identity documentation is legally required for Nordic citizens due to the Nordic Passport Union.

== Types of passport ==
Norway issues seven types of passports and travel documents:

- Ordinary Norwegian passport, issued to Norwegian citizens. Their covers are red. Passports issued to people above the age of 16 years are valid for 10 years.
- Emergency passports, sporting white covers.
- Diplomatic passports, sporting turquoise covers.
- Service passports, sporting turquoise covers.
- Special passports, sporting turquoise covers.
- Immigrant passport, issued to those who lack Norwegian citizenship and have a residence permit in Norway, but cannot get a passport from their country of citizenship. Their covers are grey. Holders are not permitted to travel to their country of citizenship with the passport.
  - Immigrant passport for a single journey, issued to those who lack Norwegian citizenship and have a residence permit in Norway, but cannot get a passport from their country of citizenship in time for a sudden trip abroad. Their covers are also grey. The passport may only be used for a single journey.
- Refugee travel document, issued to those granted asylum in Norway. Their covers are blue.

== Physical appearance and data contained ==
Current Norwegian passports are red in colour, with the coat of arms of Norway emblazoned in the top left of the front cover. The words "Kongeriket Norge", "Kongeriket Noreg", "Norgga gonagasriika" and "Kingdom of Norway" ("Kingdom of Norway" in Bokmål and Nynorsk (the two forms of Norwegian), Northern Sami and English respectively) are inscribed in the bottom left corner and the word "Pass", "Pássa" and "Passport" emblazoned below the name of the country. In the bottom right corner is the standard biometric symbol.

The pre-october 2020 version of the regular Norwegian passports was burgundy in colour, similar but not identical to the design of most EU countries. It had the coat of arms of Norway emblazoned in the top of the front cover. The words "NORGE", "NOREG" and "NORWAY" ("Norway" in Bokmål, Nynorsk and English, respectively) are inscribed below the coat of arms and the word "PASS" and "PASSPORT" emblazoned below the name of the country. Biometric passports have the standard biometric symbol at the bottom.

=== Identity information page ===
The current version Norwegian passport includes the following data:

- Photo of passport holder
- Type (a two-letter code beginning with "P")
- Code of Issuing State (NOR)
- Passport No.
- Surname
- Given Names
- Nationality (NORSK/ NORWEGIAN)
- Date of birth
- Date of issue
- Date of expiry
- Issuing authority (The police district)
- Sex
- Height
- Place of birth (Three letter country code, NOR for those born in Norway)
- CAN (six digit number)

The holder's signature and Personal No. was included on the information page in the previous passport version but was moved in the current version.

The information page ends with the machine-readable zone starting with "P<NOR", the previous version started with "PxNOR, where x indicated the type of passport. For example, ordinary passports contained "PVNOR", where the "V" presumably means "vanlig" ("ordinary" in Norwegian.)

=== Biometric data ===
According to Council Regulation (EC) 2252/2004 and 444/2009, Norwegian passports have to comply with minimum security standards. Norway is bound by the regulations as they constitute a development of provisions of the Schengen acquis within the meaning of the Agreement concluded by the Council of the European Union and Iceland and Norway.

The biometric passports contain a radio-frequency identification (RFID) chip containing the passport's printed data in a digital format along with the photograph in a JPEG format and with a digital key to verify that the data contained is authentic and hasn't been tampered with. Fingerprint data was required to be stored on Schengen member states’ passports from 2009. Norway started storing fingerprint data of persons applying for a new passport on 6 April 2010.

=== Languages ===
For ordinary and emergency passports, the data page/information pages are printed in Norwegian (Bokmål and Nynorsk), Northern Sami and English. Northern Sámi was added in 2020. However, for diplomatic, service and special passports, all content (including the cover and inner pages) are printed in English and French only.

Until the 1990s, the data and information pages of ordinary passports were printed in Norwegian, French, English and German. French and German were dropped when the data were moved to just one page.

== Design ==
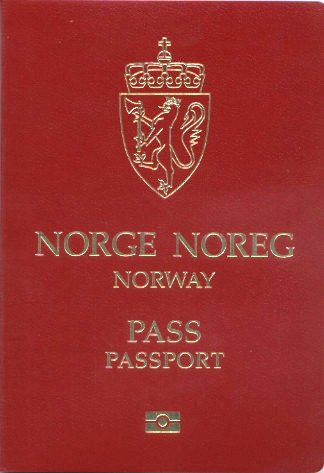
The Norwegian passport design until October 2020

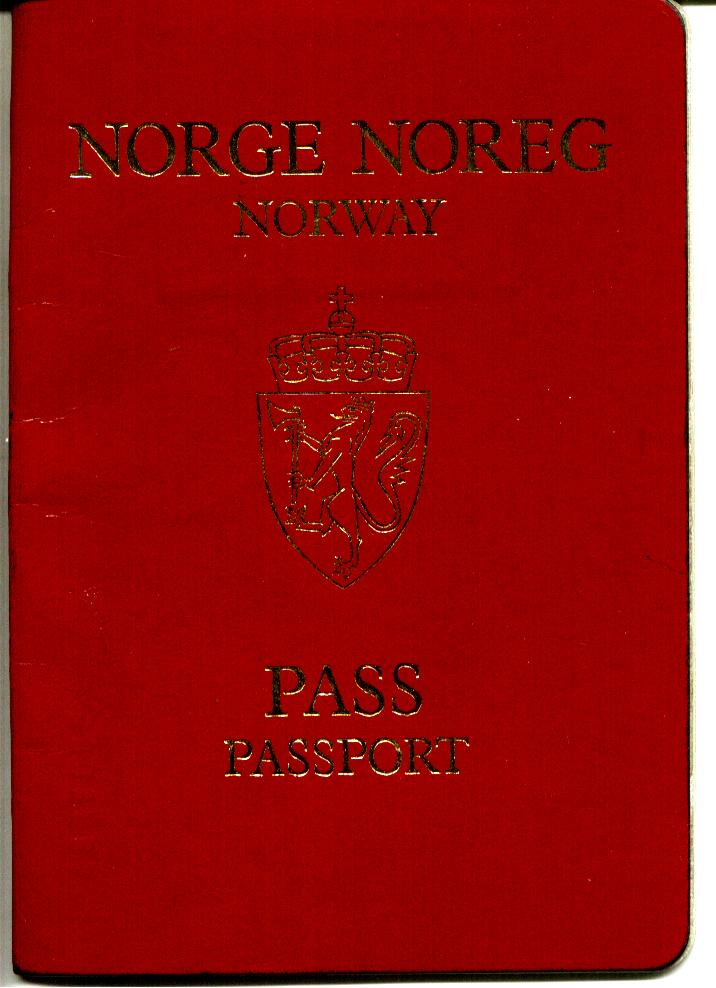
The Norwegian passport design until March 1999

The Norwegian Police Directorate and Kripos (the national unit for combating organized and other serious crime) launched a design competition for new passports, ID-cards and travel documents. It was later announced that the winner of the competition was “The Norwegian Landscape” by Neue Design Studio, an Oslo-based graphic design company.

The new passports were set to be issued in 2016. But first Neue had to work closely with the National Police Directorate in order to combine the winning design with the necessary security measures that are required of passports. The purpose of the competition was to redesign the document with a high quality of design whilst still serving its purpose and functionality. Further, the new design was to increase the security of Norwegian passports, ID-cards and travel documents.

In 2016 it was announced that the introduction of new passports was postponed to the middle of 2018. In August 2019 it was announced that the introduction of new passports was postponed for the seventh time, to October 2020. The new passports were introduced on 19 October 2020.

=== National ID card ===
Front of a Norwegian national ID card

Norwegian national ID cards started being issued from the 30 November 2020. As an alternative to presenting a passport, Norwegian citizens are entitled to use a valid national identity card to exercise their right of free movement within EFTA the EEA, (Note: Articles 4 and 5 of the Citizens' Rights Directive) and Svalbard.

Furthermore, the card can be used as a travel document to the European Microstates, Balkan countries, French Overseas Territories, Montserrat (for max. 14 days) and organized tours to Tunisia. It was usable to the United Kingdom until 1 October 2021.

== Issuing ==
Application is done at special passport offices or embassies. As of 2021 there were 79 indoor offices (including one in Svalbard) and 43 locations for mobile (bus) offices. Emergency passports are only issued at major Norwegian airports (Oslo-Gardermoen, Stavanger, Bergen and Trondheim) or embassies.

=== Identification requirements ===
When doing the application identification of the applicant is needed. This is done by:

- Showing a Norwegian passport, valid or expired, if having any (if stolen or lost, must be reported as such)
- If having no Norwegian passport, showing a valid Norwegian identity card, e.g. bank card
- If having no identity document, a document such as a letter from employer or school certifying the identity
- New citizens need a letter of approval of Norwegian citizenship, the Residence permit card, and passport from the other country or Refugee travel document

The identity is clarified when there is no doubt that the information or documents that the applicant has given supports the applicants identity.

== Different spellings of the same name ==
Names containing special letters (æ, ø, å) are spelled the correct way in the non-machine-readable zone, but are mapped in the machine-readable zone, æ becoming "AE", ø becoming "OE", and å becoming "AA". This follows the standard for machine-readable passports, which must not contain letters other than A–Z.

== Manufacturing defect ==
Machine-readable Norwegian passports issued between 1999 and 2005 suffered from a manufacturing defect that could result in the identity page coming loose, thus invalidating the passport. The Norwegian passport authorities replaced such passports free of charge.

== Visa requirements ==
Visa requirements for Norwegian citizens Norway Freedom of movement Visa free Visa issued upon arrival eVisa Visa available both on arrival or online Visa required prior to arrival

Visa requirements for Norwegian citizens are administrative entry restrictions by the authorities of other states placed on citizens of Norway. As of 5 October 2021, Norwegian citizens had visa-free or visa on arrival access to 185 countries and territories, ranking the Norwegian passport 7th overall in terms of travel freedom (tied with the Czech Republic, Greece, Malta, the United Kingdom and the United States) according to the Henley Passport Index.

As a member state of the European Free Trade Association (EFTA), Norwegian citizens enjoy freedom of movement to live and work in other EFTA countries in accordance with the EFTA convention. Moreover, by virtue of Norway's membership of the European Economic Area (EEA), Norwegian citizens also enjoy freedom of movement within all EEA member states. The Citizens' Rights Directive defines the right of free movement for citizens of the EEA, and all EFTA and EU citizens are not only visa-exempt but are legally entitled to enter and reside in each other's countries.

== See also ==
- Norwegian nationality law
- Visa requirements for Norwegian citizens
- Passports of the EFTA member states
- Norwegian identity card
