= Ingrid Semmingsen =

Norwegian historian (1910–1995)

- Born: 29 March 1910; Hamar
- Died: 31 May 1995 (aged 85); Oslo
- Citizenship: Norwegian
- Education: University of Oslo
- Scientific career
- Fields: American history social history emigration history
- Workplaces: University of Oslo
- Academic advisors: Edvard Bull, Sr. Sverre Steen

Ingrid Elisabeth Semmingsen (29 March 1910 in Hamar, Hedmark – 31 May 1995) was a Norwegian historian. Appointed as a professor at the University of Oslo in 1963, she was the first female professor of history in Norway.

== Personal life ==
Semmingsen was born in Hamar, as the daughter of Lieutenant Colonel and farmer Peter Thorvald Gaustad (1878–1949) and his wife Gudvor, née Todderud (1884–1956). She grew up at a farm in Stange Municipality. In 1939 she married Rolf Ingvar Semmingsen, a bureaucrat who served as director of the Norwegian Price Directorate.

== Career ==
Semmingsen took the cand.philol. degree in 1935 with a paper on the lower class in her native Hedmark from 1850 to 1900. She appeared on radio programs with popular singer Alf Prøysen, who came from a similar social background. Her grandfather and great-grandfather had both been involved in the Marcus Thrane movement. Ingrid was a member of the radical group Mot Dag for a short period.

She later concentrated on American history and the Norwegian immigration to the United States. Her first publication was the 1938 article Utvandringen til Amerika 1866–1873, which was printed in the journal Historisk Tidsskrift. She published En verdensmakt blir til. De forente staters historie in 1946, with a second edition in 1972, as well as the work Veien mot vest in two volumes in 1941 and 1950. The second volume earned her the dr.philos. degree in 1951, becoming the first female history doctor in Norway. She was appointed professor in American history at the University of Oslo in 1963, as the first female professor of history in Norway.

Semmingsen's appointment in American history was replaced with an appointment in general history in 1968. She again concentrated on Norwegian nineteenth-century social history in addition to emigration history. She published Standssamfunnets oppløsning i Norge in 1954, and Husmannsminner (1960) was the result of a project at the Norwegian Museum of Cultural History. In the field of emigration history she published Amerikabrev (1958) and Drøm og dåd. Utvandringen til Amerika (1975). She retired in 1978, but long after this she has been considered an authority on the Norwegian immigration to the United States, together with Odd Lovoll. Lovoll has cited Semmingsen as his primary inspiration, and called her body of work a "national treasure".

Semmingsen was a member of the Norwegian Academy of Science and Letters from 1952, and held honorary degrees at the Uppsala University and St. Olaf College. She was also a deputy member of the Norwegian Nobel Committee. Her last article was printed in 1988, and she died in 1995 in Oslo.

== Selected works ==
- Veien mot vest (2 volumes) (1941 and 1950)
- En verdensmakt blir til. De forente staters historie (1946)
- Standssamfunnets oppløsning i Norge (1954)
- Amerikabrev (1958)
- Husmannsminner (1960)
- Drøm og dåd. Utvandringen til Amerika (1975); translated as Norway to America: A History of the Migration (1980)
