= Christine B. Meyer =

Norwegian academic, politician and civil servant

Professor Christine B. Meyer PhD
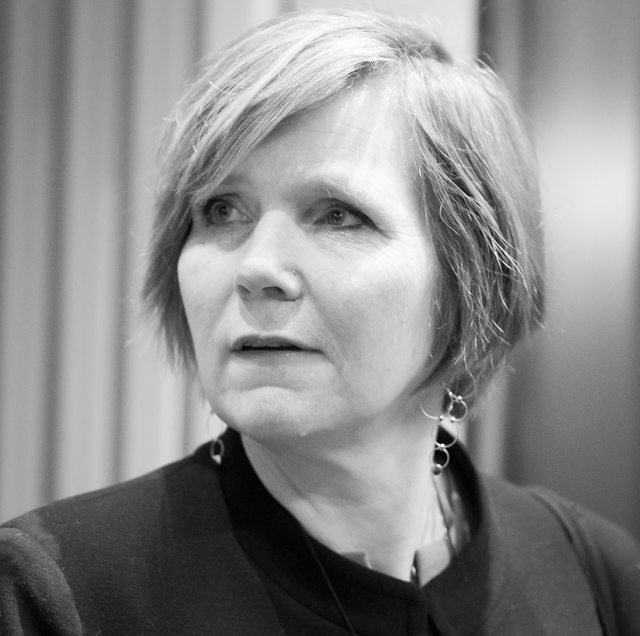
- Meyer in 2017

Chief Commissioner of Bergen
- In office 30 October 2023 – 25 September 2026
- Deputy: Marte Monstad; Christian Haugen
- Mayor: Marit Warncke
- Preceded by: Rune Bakervik
- Succeeded by: Chris Jørgen Rødland

Bergen City Commissioner for Health and Social Affairs
- In office 29 April 2009 – 24 January 2011
- Chief Commissioner: Monica Mæland
- Preceded by: Liv Røssland
- Succeeded by: Hilde Onarheim

Bergen City Commissioner for Finance
- In office 29 October 2007 – 29 April 2009
- Chief Commissioner: Monica Mæland
- Preceded by: Henning Warloe
- Succeeded by: Henning Warloe

Personal details
- Born: 22 January 1964 (age 62) Bergen, Hordaland, Norway
- Party: Conservative
- Spouse: Victor D. Norman (m. 2005; died 2024)
- Occupation: Academic; Politician; Civil servant

Christine Benedichte Meyer (born 22 January 1964) is a Norwegian business administration academic, politician for the Conservative Party and civil servant. She served as the Chief Commissioner of Bergen from 2023 to 2026.

She previously served as State Secretary in the Ministry of Labour, and been City Commissioner for Finance and City Commissioner for Health in Bergen. She was Director General of the Norwegian Competition Authority from 2011 to 2015, and Director General of Statistics Norway from 2015 to 2017.

== Political career ==
=== Government ===
Meyer served as State Secretary in the Ministry of Labour from 2001 to 2003.

=== Local politics ===
Meyer served as Bergen Commissioner for Finance, Competition and Government Reform in the city government of Bergen from 2007 to 2009, when she switched jobs to become City Commissioner for Health and Inclusion from 2009 to 2011.

In June 2022, she became the Bergen Conservatives' candidate for Chief Commissioner in the 2023 local elections. During the campaign, she had pledged to not revisit the verdict of building the new Bergen light rail over Bryggen, but later backtracked and was open for renegotiating the decision. The election in Bergen led to no coalition having a clear majority. Meyer and the Conservatives initially negotiated with the Christian Democrats and Liberal Party, but later went to negotiate with the Progress Party and Centre Party about forming a new city government. On 6 October, the Conservatives reached an agreement to form a new majority with the Bergen List, Progress, Centre, Industry and Business and Pensioners' parties.

=== Chief Commissioner of Bergen ===
She and her government assumed office on 30 October, consisting of the Conservatives, Progress and Centre parties, with Marte Monstad of the Progress Party as Meyer's deputy.

She announced in January 2026 that she would not seek re-election at the 2027 local elections. Ahead of the party's convention to nominate her successor candidate, she announced that she would be stepping down in the autumn, allowing her successor to lead the party into next year's election. The party ultimately chose group leader Chris Jørgen Rødland to succeed her. He formally succeeded her as chief commissioner on 25 September.

==== Tenure ====
Meyer faced a no confidence vote put forward by the Red Party at the end of 2025 and was voted down in a 36–31 vote in January 2026. The vote was put forward after a whistleblower had come forward in 2025 regarding the sharing of sensitive information concerning the municipal administration's handling of whistleblower cases, which also had roots in a similar mishandling of sensitive information of a child welfare case. The latter case had also led to two confidence vote against city commissioner Charlotte Spurkeland, which also failed.

== Civic career ==
In December 2010, she was nominated to become Director General of the Norwegian Competition Authority. She assumed office in April 2011, and held the position until 2015.

In June 2015, she was nominated to become Director General of Statistics Norway. She resigned her position in November 2017 after losing confidence from the Ministry of Finance in organising a major restructuring of the bureau.

== Personal life ==
She was born in Bergen on 22 January 1964, and has worked as a Professor of Strategy and Management at the Norwegian School of Economics.

She was married to former minister of administration Victor D. Norman between 2005 and 2024, when he died.

Civic offices
Preceded by Knut Eggum Johansen	Director General of the Norwegian Competition Authority; 2011–2015	Succeeded by Magnus Gabrielsen (acting)
Preceded by Hans Henrik Scheel	Director General of Statistics Norway; 2015–2017	Succeeded by Birger Vikøren (acting)
Political offices
Preceded by Henning Warloe	City Commissioner for Finance in Bergen; 2007–2009	Succeeded by Henning Warloe
Preceded by Liv Røssland	City Commissioner for Health in Bergen; 2009–2011	Succeeded by Hilde Onarheim
Preceded by Rune Bakervik	Chief Commissioner of Bergen; 2023–2026	Succeeded by Chris Jørgen Rødland
