= Hans Henrik Scheel =

Norwegian civil servant (born 1956)

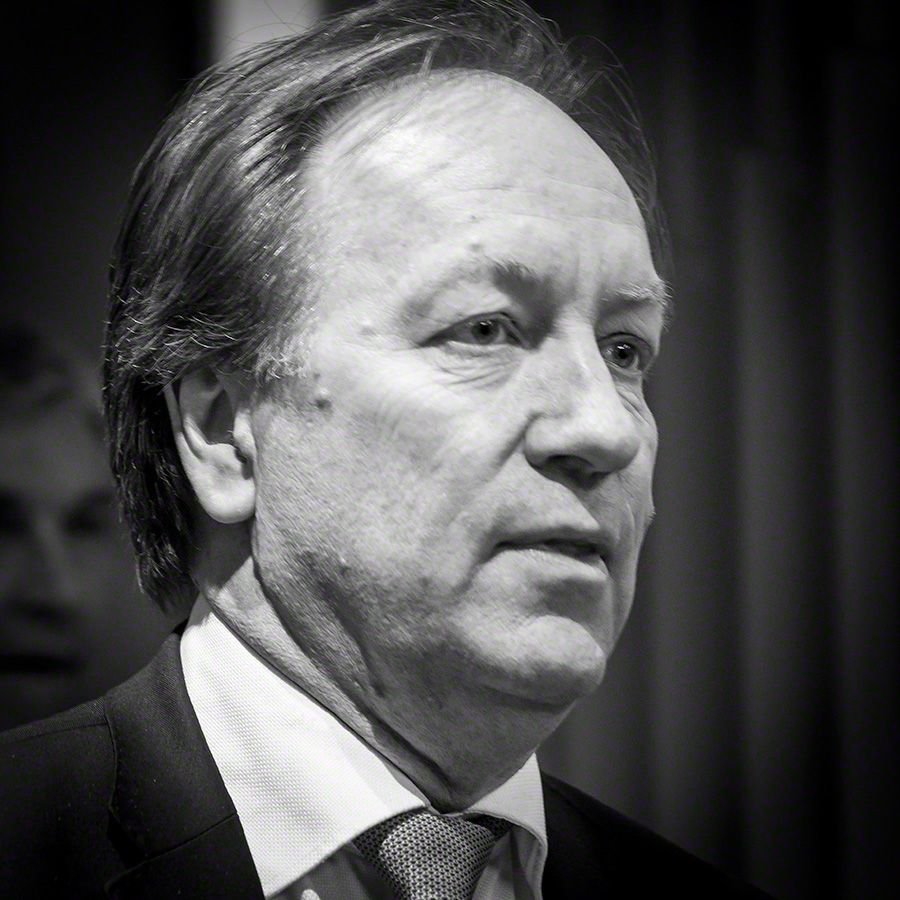
Scheel in 2016

Hans Henrik Scheel (born 22 September 1956) is a Norwegian social economist and civil servant.

Born 22 September 1956, Scheel graduated from the University of Oslo in 1985.

Scheel served as director of the Statistics Norway from 2011 to 2015. He has been member of three governmental tax commissions, including chairman of the Scheel Commission.

== Other activities ==
- International Monetary Fund (IMF), Ex-Officio Alternate Member of the Board of Governors

Civic offices
Preceded by Øystein Olsen	Director of Statistics Norway; 2011–2015	Succeeded by Christine B. Meyer
