= Wilhelm Thagaard =

Norwegian jurist and civil servant

Wilhelm Thagaard (31 October 1890 – 1 December 1970) was a Norwegian jurist and civil servant. He was born in Kristiania. He chaired Prisdirektoratet over two periods, a total of twenty years. During the occupation of Norway by Nazi Germany Thagaard was a member of "Kretsen", a leading body of the Norwegian Resistance Movement. A special law from 1945, "Lex Thagaard", was named after him. He represented Norway internationally in OEEC, OECD and GATT. He was a member of the Norwegian Association for Women's Rights.
