= Henning Warloe =

Norwegian politician

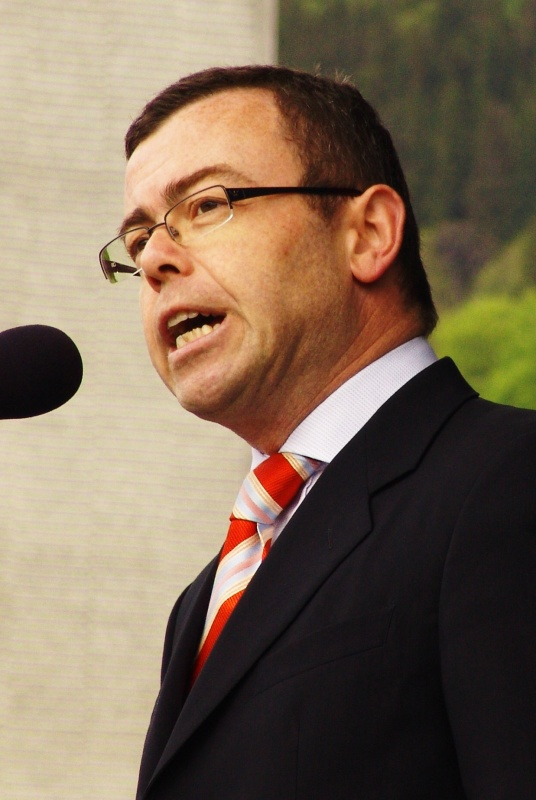

Bergen City Commissioner for Urban Development
- In office 14 August 2014 – 22 October 2015
- Chief Commissioner: Ragnhild Stolt-Nielsen; Martin Smith-Sivertsen
- Preceded by: Filip Rygg
- Succeeded by: Anna Elisa Tryti

Member of the Storting
- In office 1 October 2009 – 30 September 2013
- Constituency: Hordaland

Bergen City Commissioner for Finance
- In office 29 April 2009 – 28 September 2009
- Chief Commissioner: Monica Mæland
- Preceded by: Christine B. Meyer
- Succeeded by: Harald Victor Hove
- In office 27 October 2003 – 29 October 2007
- Chief Commissioner: Monica Mæland
- Preceded by: Trond Tystad
- Succeeded by: Christine B. Meyer

Bergen City Commissioner for Culture and Enterprise
- In office 27 October 2003 – 28 September 2009
- Chief Commissioner: Monica Mæland
- Preceded by: Anne-Grete Strøm-Erichsen
- Succeeded by: Lisbeth Iversen (Enterprise); Monica Mæland (Culture)

Personal details
- Born: 24 March 1961 (age 65) Bergen, Hordaland, Norway
- Party: Conservative
- Education: Norwegian School of Economics
- Occupation: Businessman; Politician; Civil servant

Henning Warloe (born 24 March 1961 in Bergen, Norway) is a Norwegian politician for the Conservative Party who served as a member of parliament for Hordaland between 2009 and 2013. A native of Bergen, he sat in the municipal government between 2003 and 2009 before making a return between 2014 and 2015.

== Career ==
He graduated as an officer in the Norwegian Army, and holds a degree in economics from Norwegian School of Economics from 1986. Aside from his political career, Henning Warloe worked as a salesman for Strømsnes Tekniske AS between 1980 and 1981, Director of Finance for Oskar Pedersen AS from 1986 to 1988, Manager for Kløverhuset shopping center between 1988 and 1993, Manager of Sommer Bergen AS from 1993 to 1995 and Chairman of Pepper AS between 1995 and 2003. He was one of the founders of Ferieklubben in Bergen. One of Warloe's hobbies is magic, and he was President of Magiske Cirkel Norge (The Magic Circle of Norway), a national organization for magicians, from 2008 until 2010.

Warloe was a member of Bergen City Council from 1995 to 2003 and the leader of European Movement International in Hordaland between 1996 and 2001. From 2003 to 2007 he was Commissioner for Finance, Property Management and Business Development in the municipal government. He was also a member of the board of the Bergen Conservative Party between 2003 and 2009 as well as the first deputy leader of the Hordaland Conservative Party. From 2007, Warloe was Commissioner for Culture, Sports and Business Development and from spring 2009, after the Progress Party withdrew from the government, he was also Acting Commissioner for Finance, Competition and Development. From 2 June until 31 January 2007, during Monica Mæland's maternity leave, Warloe was acting chief commissioner. He stepped down in the autumn of 2009, as he was elected to the Storting for Hordaland in the 2009 parliamentary election.

In 2013, Warloe was fined and got a suspended sentence for possession and use of narcotics. Before he was sentenced he resigned from his political duties for the Conservative Party.

Warloe returned to the Bergen municipal government in 2014 when he was appointed city commissioner for urban development. He held the position until the 2015 local elections and was succeeded by Anna Elisa Tryti.

Political offices
Preceded by Anne-Grete Strøm-Erichsen	Bergen City Commissioner of Culture and Enterprise; 2003–2009	Succeeded by Monica Mæland (Culture); Lisbeth Iversen (Enterprise)
Preceded by Trond Tystad	Bergen City Commissioner of Finance; 2003–2007 (Hans Edvard Seim acting 2006–2007)	Succeeded by Christine B. Meyer
Preceded by Monica Mæland	Governing mayor of Bergen; 2006–2007 (acting)	Succeeded by Monica Mæland
Preceded by Christine B. Meyer	Bergen City Commissioner of Finance; April 2009–September 2009	Succeeded by Harald Victor Hove
Preceded by Filip Rygg	Bergen City Commissioner for Urban Development; 2014–2015	Succeeded by Anna Elisa Tryti
