= Charlotte Spurkeland =

Norwegian politician

Bergen City Commissioner for Child Services, Social Services and Diversity
- In office 30 October 2023 – 25 September 2026
- Chief Commissioner: Christine B. Meyer
- Preceded by: Line Berggren Jacobsen
- Succeeded by: Caroline Taule

Deputy Member of the Storting
- In office 1 October 2021 – 30 September 2025
- Deputising for: Erna Solberg (2021)
- Constituency: Hordaland
- In office 1 October 2013 – 30 September 2017
- Constituency: Hordaland

Bergen City Commissioner for Schools and Kindergartens
- Acting
- In office 20 October 2014 – 31 December 2014
- Chief Commissioner: Martin Smith-Sivertsen
- Preceded by: Harald Victor Hove
- Succeeded by: Jana Middelfart Hoff

Personal details
- Born: 12 August 1987 (age 39) London, England
- Party: Conservative

Charlotte Spurkeland (born 12 August 1987) is a Norwegian politician for the Conservative Party. She served as a deputy member of parliament for Hordaland from 2021 to 2025, having previously done so from 2013 to 2017. She also served as the Bergen city commissioner for child services, social services and diversity from 2023 to 2026.

== Political career ==
=== Parliament ===
She served as a deputy representative to the Parliament of Norway from Hordaland during the term 2013–2017. In total she met during 150 days of parliamentary session. She was re-elected at the 2021 election and deputised for prime minister Erna Solberg in the last two weeks of her premiership.

=== Local politics ===
Hailing from Bergen, she has been a member of Bergen city council and worked her dayjob for the Conservative caucus in the council.

She was acting Bergen city commissioner for schools and kindergartens from 20 October to 31 December 2014.

Following the 2023 local elections, she was appointed city commissioner for child services, social services and diversity. She was appointed acting city commissioner for finance following Eivind Nævdal-Bolstad's resignation in late May 2024, holding the position until late June, when Jacob Mæhle was appointed as his permanent successor. In April 2026, she was appointed acting city commissioner for education following the resignation of Daniel Hägglund. She held the position until the permanent appointment of Christian Haugen the next month.

Spurkeland faced several controversies in October 2025. In one case Bergensavisen revealed that over a thousand Bergen disabled residents had received too little money in housing benefits, which culminated in a failed no confidence vote from the opposition against her. Later that same month, Bergens Tidende revealed that a section chief in the municipal administration had been fired following a data leak, allegedly to "save the city government", a claim both Spurkeland and the municipal director, Belén Birkenes, denied, with Spurkeland asserting it was a personnel case.

After Chris Jørgen Rødland succeeded Christine B. Meyer as chief commissioner on 25 September 2026, Spurkeland was shuffled out of cabinet and was replaced by Caroline Taule.

=== Youth politics ===
She has chaired the Conservative Students in Norway and was a central board member of the Norwegian Young Conservatives. She has also been involved in student politics at the University of Bergen, where she has studied law. Internationally she was the Chairman of the International Young Democrat Union from 2014 to 2015 and has been a co-chair for the permanent working group on Policies for Europe in the European Democrat Students.

Political offices
Preceded by Harald Victor Hove	Bergen City Commissioner of Education; 2014 (acting)	Succeeded by Jana Midelfart Hoff
Preceded by Line Berggren Jacobsen	Bergen City Commissioner for Child Services, Social Services and Diversity; 2023–2026	Succeeded by Caroline Taule
Preceded by Eivind Nævdal-Bolstad	Bergen City Commissioner for Finance; 2024 (acting)	Succeeded by Jacob Mæhle
