= Datakortet =

Norwegian licensee of the European Computer Driving Licence

Datakortet AS
- Company type: Public
- Industry: IKT Certifications
- Founded: Kirkenes, Norway (December 17, 1996
- Headquarters: Kirkenes, Norway
- Area served: Norway
- Key people: Bernt Nilsen (CEO), Bjørn Trondsen (Chairman of the board)
- Products: Datakortet
- Number of employees: 11 (2022)
- Subsidiaries: Norsk Test AS
- Website: www.datakortet.no

Datakortet is the Norwegian licensee of the European Computer Driving Licence. Datakortet is located in Kirkenes, and its products are distributed through 400 test centers in Norway. Over 200,000 Norwegians participate in the ECDL program.

Datakortet's wholly owned subsidiary, Norsk Test AS, issues national boating licenses under a contract with the Norwegian Maritime Directorate.
