= Statistics Norway =

Norwegian government statistics bureau

- Statistisk sentralbyrå

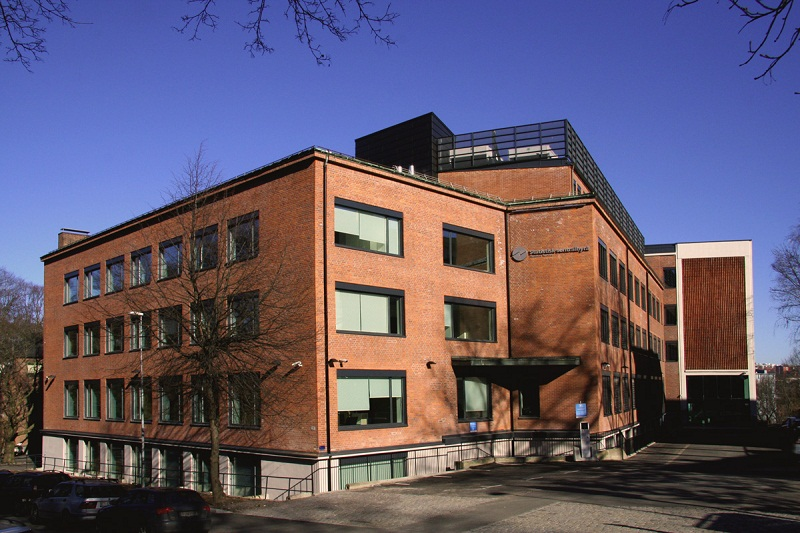
- Statistics Norway building in Oslo

Agency overview
- Formed: 1876; 150 years ago
- Website: www.ssb.no/en/

Statistics Norway (Norwegian: Statistisk sentralbyrå, abbreviated to SSB) is the Norwegian statistics bureau. It was established in 1876.

With a staff of approximately 1,000, it publishes around 1,000 new statistical releases annually on its website in both Norwegian and English. Additionally, it offers a number of edited publications, all of which are available for free online.

As the central Norwegian office for official government statistics, Statistics Norway provides the public and government with extensive research and analysis activities. It is administratively placed under the Ministry of Finance but operates independently from all government agencies. Statistics Norway has a board appointed by the government. It relies extensively on data from registers, but are also collecting data from surveys and questionnaires, including from cities and municipalities.

== History ==
Statistics Norway was originally established in 1876. The Statistics Act of 1989 provides the legal framework for Statistics Norway's activities.

== Directors General ==
A Director General heads the agency.

Directors General have included:

- Geir Axelsen, Director General (May 2018 - incumbent)
- Birger Vikøren, acting Director General (autumn 2017 - May 2018)
- Christine B. Meyer, Director General (2015 - autumn 2017). In the autumn of 2017 she resigned from that position after Finance Minister Siv Jensen declared that Meyer no longer had her confidence. The conflict centred on the question of the organisation of the Research Section.
- Hans Henrik Scheel, Director (2011 - 2015)
