= Norwegian nationality law =

Norwegian Nationality Act Lov om norsk statsborgerskap

Storting
- Citation: 10 juni 2005 nr. 51
- Territorial extent: Norway
- Enacted by: Storting
- Royal assent: 10 June 2005
- Commenced: 1 September 2006

Repeals
- 8 desember 1950 nr. 3
- Status: Amended

Norwegian nationality law details the conditions by which an individual is a national of Norway. The primary law governing these requirements is the Norwegian Nationality Act, which came into force on 1 September 2006. Norway is a member state of the European Free Trade Association (EFTA) and the Schengen Area. All Norwegian nationals have automatic and permanent permission to live and work in any European Union (EU) or EFTA country.

Any person born to at least one Norwegian parent receives citizenship at birth, regardless of the place of birth. Foreign nationals may naturalise after meeting a residence requirement (usually eight years) and demonstrating proficiency in Norwegian or a Sami language. Citizens of other EEA and Nordic countries may acquire Norwegian nationality with reduced residency requirements.

== History ==
=== European integration ===
Norway was a founding member of the European Free Trade Association, which was established in 1960. The formation of the European Union in 1992 and consequent creation of EU citizenship allowed nationals of all EU countries to live and work in any other member state. The scope of these free movement rights was expanded with the establishment of the European Economic Area (EEA) in 1994 to include nationals of all EEA member states, which included the entire EFTA except for Liechtenstein and Switzerland. Following the 1992 Swiss referendum rejecting EEA membership, Liechtenstein renegotiated its customs union with Switzerland to allow for sole participation in the EEA, which it acceded to in 1995. Switzerland concluded a separate free movement agreement with the EU that came into force in 2002.

=== Dual citizenship ===
With effect from 1 January 2020 Norway allows dual citizenship.

A Norwegian citizen acquiring a foreign citizenship does not lose Norwegian citizenship. Former Norwegian citizens who lost Norwegian citizenship prior to this date (upon naturalisation in another country) may re-acquire Norwegian citizenship by declaration.

== Acquisition and loss of nationality ==
=== Entitlement by birth, adoption, or descent ===
Individuals born to a Norwegian parent automatically receive Norwegian nationality at birth regardless of birthplace. Children under age 18 who are adopted in Norway by a Norwegian national acquire Norwegian nationality at the time of adoption. Abandoned children found in Norway with unclear parentage are assumed to be Norwegian nationals unless foreign parentage is established. Prior to 1979, Norwegian nationality was only transferrable by descent through Norwegian fathers but not mothers.

=== Voluntary acquisition ===
Foreigners may become Norwegian nationals by application after residing in the country for at least eight of the previous eleven years, while holding a work or residence permit valid for at least one year. Applicants must be at least 12 years old, demonstrate proficiency in Norwegian or a Sami language (Note: The Norwegian government officially recognizes Northern Sámi, Southern Sámi, and Lule Sámi.) (or alternatively complete 300 hours of Norwegian language courses), intend to reside in Norway permanently, pass a good character requirement, and not have a criminal record.

The residency requirement is reduced to three of the previous ten years (while holding a valid work or residence permit for at least one year) if an applicant is married to or in civil union with a Norwegian national. EEA citizens qualify for naturalisation after three years of residence if their initial residence permit was granted for a period of at least five years, and Nordic Council citizens may apply after living in the country for two years. Former Norwegian nationals may apply for nationality restoration after two years residence and holding a residence permit valid for at least one year. Applicants with a criminal record must wait a further "quarantine" period dependent on the crime committed before being granted citizenship.

Nordic citizens over age 18 may become Norwegian nationals by notification after residing in the country for at least seven years. Former Norwegians who hold Nordic citizenship and reestablish domicile in Norway may reacquire Norwegian nationality by notification with no minimum period of residence. Any minor children of an individual who acquires nationality by notification also become Norwegian nationals. Qualified individuals have a legal entitlement to Norwegian nationality through this pathway and are processed through a simplified procedure that requires no application fee. By contrast, approval for a grant of nationality by application is subject to discretionary approval by government authorities.

Prior to 1 January 2020, any person who acquired Norwegian nationality was required to renounce any previous citizenships they had. This has not been required since that date.

=== Relinquishment and deprivation ===
Norwegian citizens who acquire citizenship by birth but have resided less than 2 years in Norway or 7 years in Nordic Council countries must apply to retain Norwegian citizenship before turning 22 years of age unless they would otherwise be stateless. Applicants are not required to renounce other citizenships, but are required to demonstrate "adequate ties" to Norway. Often, frequent travel to Norway or a year of study in Norway are accepted.

Effective 1 January 2019, individuals with dual citizenship can be deprived of their citizenship should they be sentenced to six years imprisonment for serious crimes related to war crimes, terrorism, treason or espionage.

Norwegian citizens may also lose citizenship if they formally petition for permission to renounce it. To prevent statelessness, Norwegian citizenship may be renounced only if the person proves that they are a citizen of another state.

Foreigners who have acquired Norwegian citizenship may lose it if they are found to have lied about their origins.

== See also ==
- Visa policy of Norway
- Visa requirements for Norwegian citizens
