= Norwegian Competition Authority =

Norwegian government agency

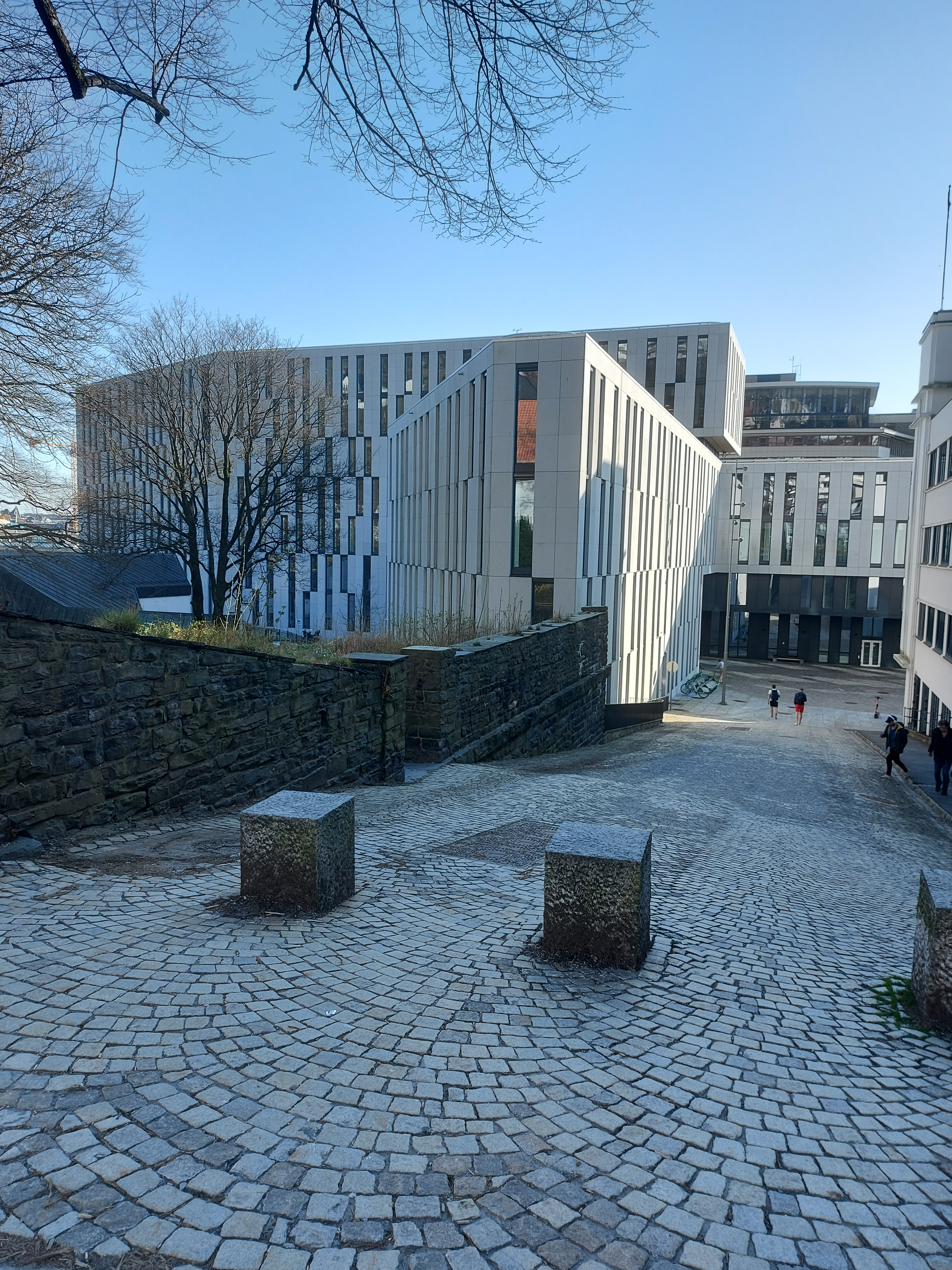
- Type: Government agency
- Industry: general public administration activities
- Founded: 1917
- Headquarters: Bergen, Norway
- Area served: Norway
- Key people: Tina Søreide (Director)
- Number of employees: 100 (2026)
- Parent: Norwegian Ministry of Government Administration and Reform
- Website: www.konkurransetilsynet.no

Norwegian Competition Authority (Norwegian: Konkurransetilsynet) is a Norwegian government agency responsible for managing the Competition Act of 2004, including regulations imposed through the European Economic Community. This includes regulating cooperation that hinders competition, misuse of a dominant market position and control of buy-outs and mergers. The authority is based in Bergen.

== History ==
Competition regulation in Norway dates back to the break-out of World War I when merchants made large profits maximizing the price of necessary goods. To counter this, the authorities regulated the price and availability of food through rations. On July 21, 1917 the Norwegian Price Directorate was created to regulate the Norwegian market. The present name came in 1994 when a new Competition Act was passed and the authority restructured.

In 2003, the agency was moved from Oslo to Bergen, along with six other directorates and inspectorates which were moved out of Oslo, in a program initialized by Victor Norman, Minister of Government Administration and Reform of the Conservative Party. It cost 729 million Norwegian krone (NOK) to move the seven agencies. An official report from 2009 concluded that the agencies had lost 75 to 90% of their employees, mostly those with long seniority, and that for a while critical functions for society were dysfunctional. No costs reductions had been made, there was no significant impact on the target area, and there was little impact on the communication between the agencies and the ministries. In a 2010 report, Professor Jarle Trondal concluded that none of the agencies had become more independent after the move, despite this being one of the main arguments from the minister. Norman successor, Heidi Grande Røys of the Socialist Left Party, stated that the moving had had an important symbolic effect on the target areas, and that she did not see the lack of advantages as a reason to not move similar agencies later.
