= List of people from Bergen =

This is a list of famous people from Bergen, Norway.

== Artists and actors ==
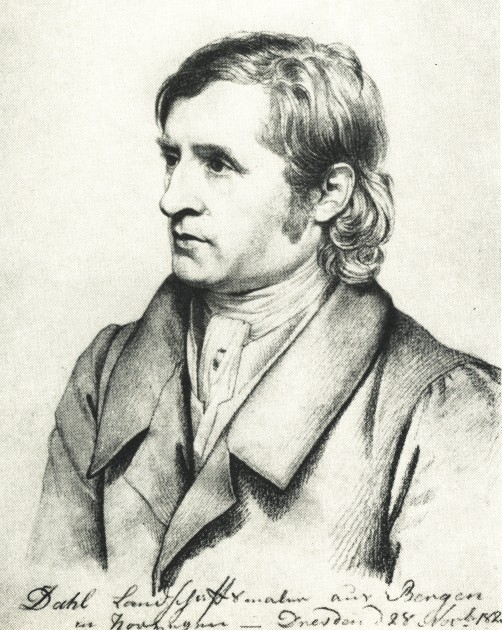
Johan Christian Dahl, portrait 1823

- Johan Christian Dahl (1788–1857) painter.
- Benedicte Hundevadt (1829–1883) stage actress and concert singer
- Magdalene Osenbroch (1830–1854) actress.
- Rolfine Absalonsen (1846–1933) actress.
- Ingeborg Belling (1848–1927), actress.
- Elly Kjølstad (1850–1930) actress
- Henny Astrup (1876–1961) actress.
- Xan Krohn (1882–1959) painter
- Tordis Halvorsen (1884–1955) actress.
- Elsa Garmann Andersen (1891-1964) amateur photographer active in Bergen's Camera Club in the late 1920s.
- Einar Granum (1920–1992) painter, illustrator, writer and educator.
- Eilif Armand (1921-1993) actor
- Helge Jordal (1946–) actor.
- Frank Krog (1954–2008) actor
- Bjarte Hjelmeland (1970–) actor
- Martin Kvamme (1975–) graphic designer
- Vegard Ylvisåker (1979–) & Bård Ylvisåker (1982–) comedians, musicians, talk show hosts.
- Daniel Simonsen comedian, actor.

== Authors ==
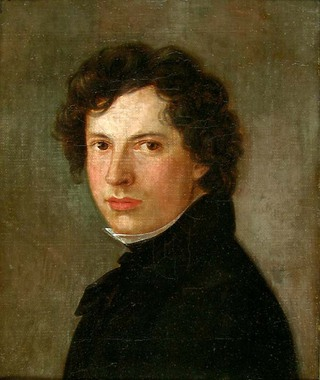
Johan Sebastian Welhaven, portrait 1827

- Dorothe Engelbretsdotter (1634–1713) author.
- Ludvig Holberg (1684–1754) playwright.
- Nicoline Thaulow (1807–1885) author
- Johan Sebastian Welhaven (1807–1873) author, poet.
- Amalie Skram (1846–1905) author
- Arnulf Øverland (1889–1968) author
- Carl Søyland (1894–1978) Norwegian American editor-in-chief of Nordisk Tidende
- Nils Lie (1902–1978) author
- Nordahl Grieg (1902–1943) poet, author
- Torborg Nedreaas (1906–1987) author and winner of the Kritikerprisen
- Babbis Friis-Baastad (1921-1970) children's writer
- Gunnar Staalesen (1947–) author
- Bård Ose (1960-) music journalist, author
- Grethe Fatima Syéd (1968-) literary critic, novelist
- Helge Fauskanger (1971-) author and philologist

== Musicians ==
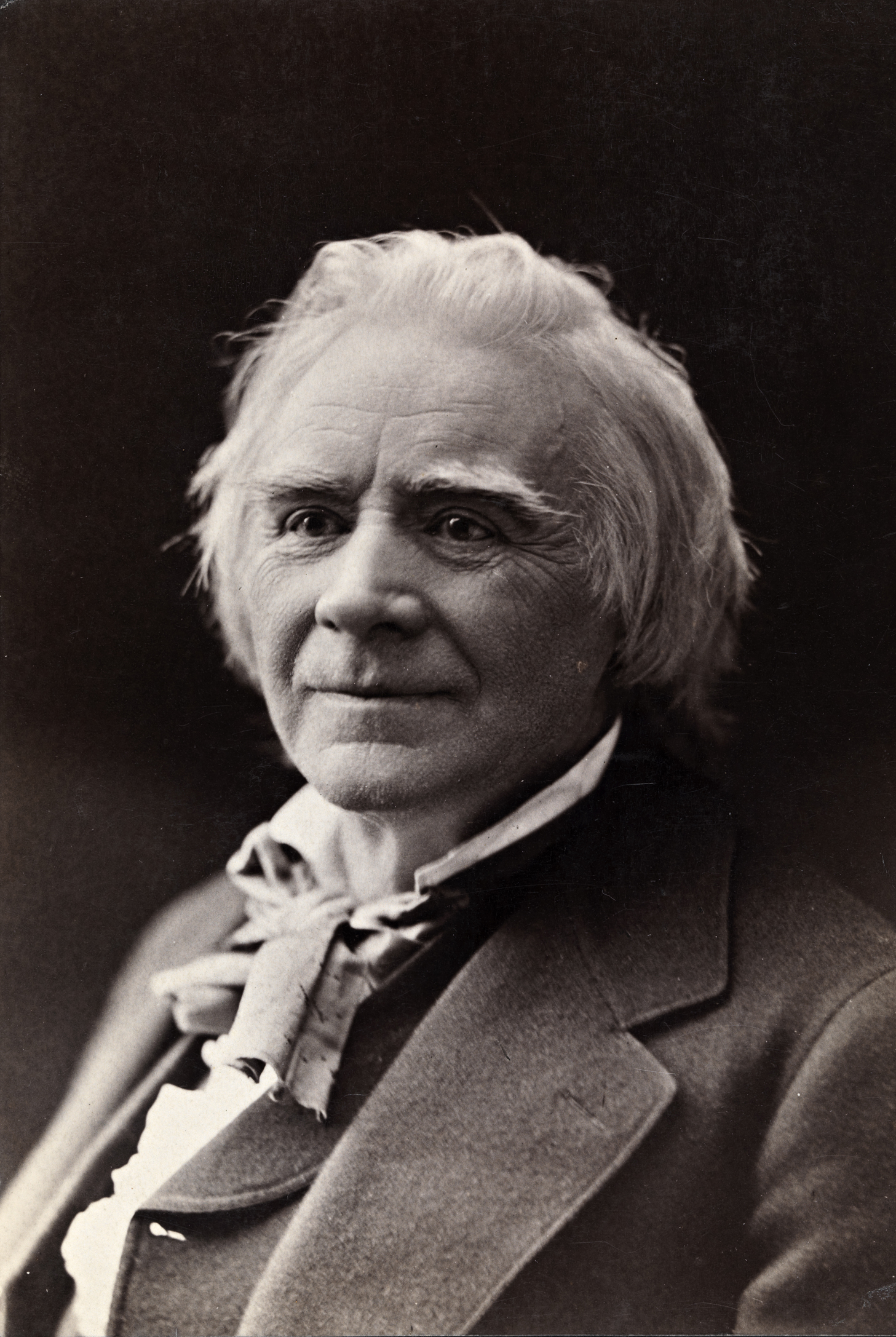
Ole Bull

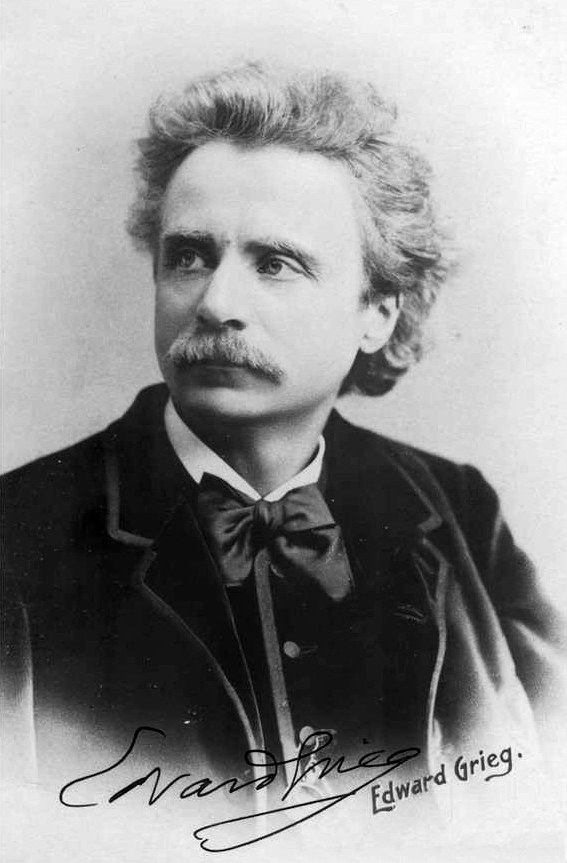
Edvard Grieg, 1888

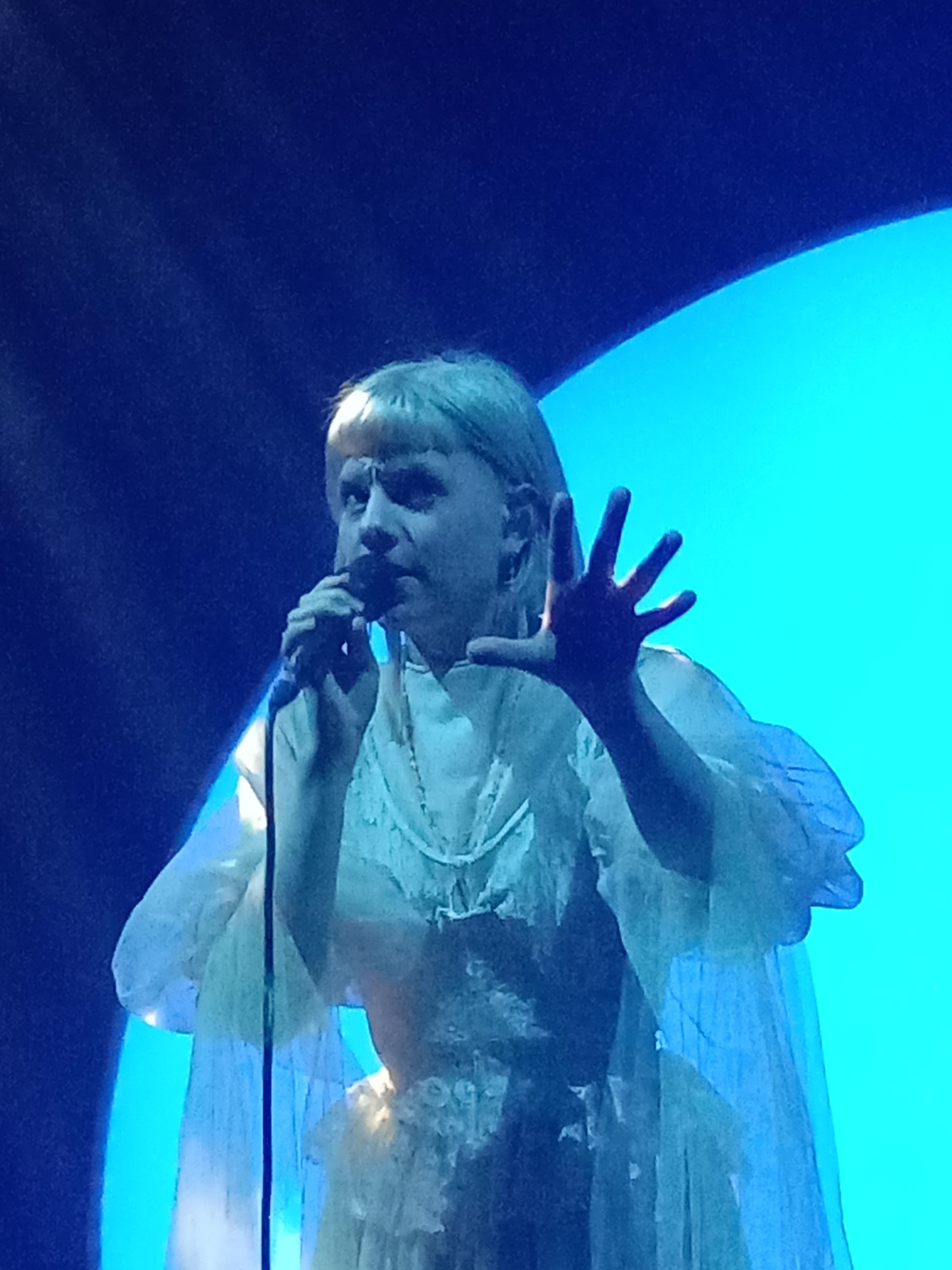
Aurora Aksnes, 2022

- Ole Bull (1810–1880) violinist, composer.
- Edvard Grieg (1843–1907) composer, pianist.
- Harald Sæverud (1897–1992) composer
- Siff Pettersen (1934–2000) operatic soprano
- Eirik Hundvin (1950- ) also known as Pytten, is a Norwegian producer, musician and recording engineer
- Jan Eggum (1951–) singer-songwriter
- Truls Mørk (1961–) cellist
- Sissel Kyrkjebø (1969–) singer
- Magnet (musician) (1970–) musician
- Roger Tiegs (1972-) musician: Gorgoroth/Borknagar/Desekrator/Orcustus
- Olve Eikemo (1973-) musician: Immortal/Abbath/Bömbers
- Varg Vikernes (1973–) musician: Burzum/Mayhem, convicted murderer
- Tom Cato Visnes (1974-) musician: Gorgoroth/Wardruna/King OV Hell/I/Abbath
- Kristian Espedal (1975–) musician: God Seed/Gorgororth/Gaahlskagg/Wardruna
- Erlend Øye (1975–) musician
- Eirik Glambek Bøe (1975–) musician
- Kurt Nilsen (1978-) musician, singer-songwriter
- Anne Lilia Berge Strand (1978–) musician
- Einar Selvik (1979-) musician: Gorgoroth/Wardruna
- Sondre Lerche (1982–) musician
- John Olav Nilsen (1982–) singer, songwriter
- Lars Vaular (1984–) rapper
- Christine Guldbrandsen (1985–) singer
- Marthe Wang (1990-) singer, songwriter
- Kygo (1991–) Kyrre Gørvell-Dahll, DJ, record producer
- Kamelen (1993-) rapper
- Aurora Aksnes (1996–) singer, songwriter
- Alan Walker (1997–) producer
- KREAM (brothers Daniel and Markus Slettebakken) record producers

== Academics and Scientists ==
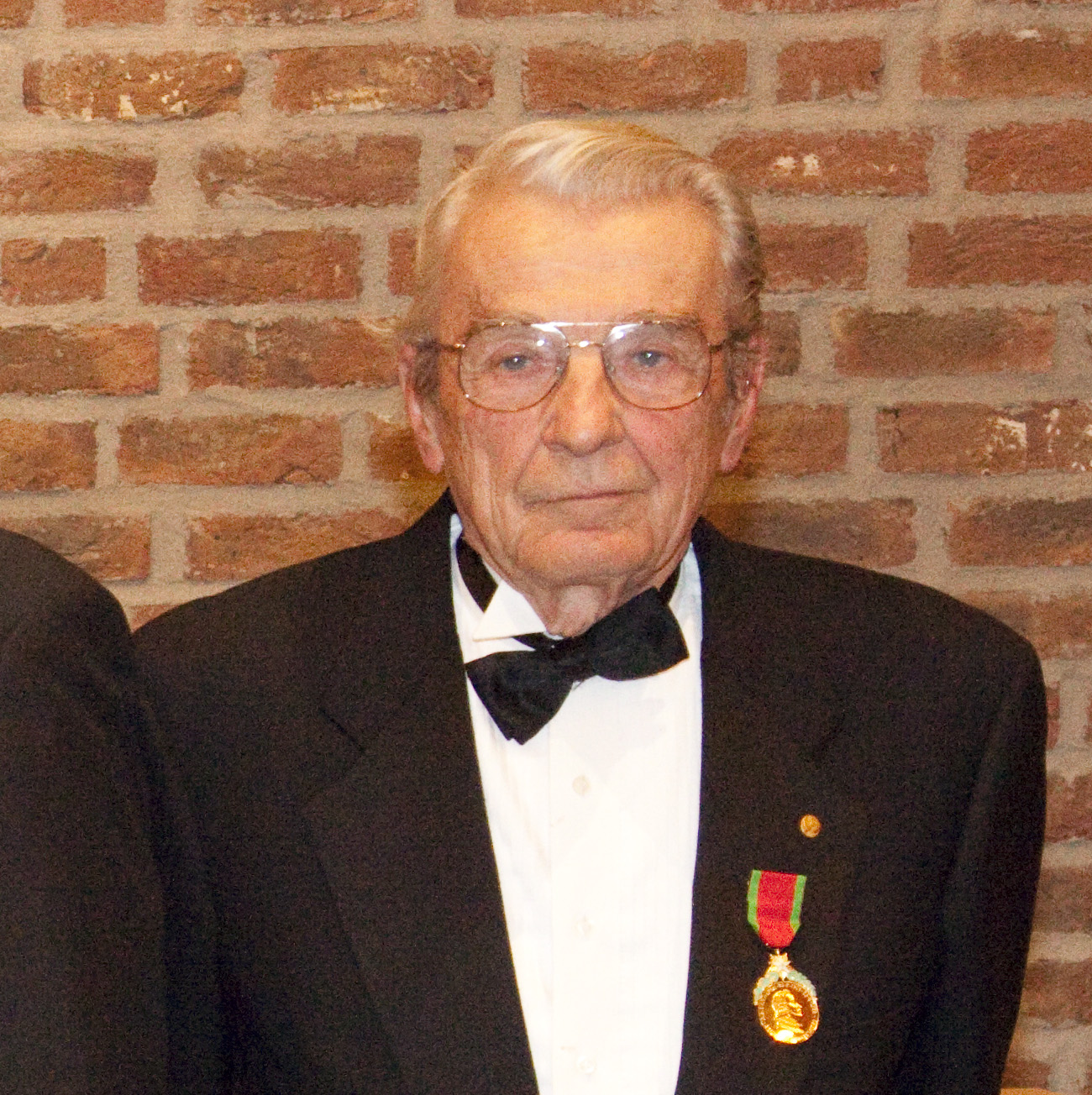
Ivar Giæver, 2010

- Gerhard Armauer Hansen (1841–1912) leprosy researcher
- Leonhard Hess Stejneger (1851–1943) ornithologist, herpetologist and zoologist
- Hans Henrik Reusch (1852–1922) a geologist, geomorphologist and educator.
- Finn Devold (1902-1977) was an Arctic explorer, marine biologist and meteorologist.
- Rigmor Frimannslund Holmsen (1911–2006) ethnologist.
- Erling Fjellbirkeland (1911–1986) research administrator and director of the Norwegian Research Council for Science and the Humanities.
- Reidar Fauske Sognnaes (1911–1984) Dean of the Harvard University School of Dental Medicine
- Søren Laland (1922–1998) biochemist
- Ivar Giaever (1929–2025) Nobel Prize in Physics laureate in 1973
- Sverre Bagge (1942-) historian
- Turid Karlsen Seim (1945–2016) doctor of theology
- Frank Aarebrot (1947-2017) political scientist
- Tone Birkeland (1947-) literary scholar who has contributed to research on children's literature and picture books
- Guri Rørtveit (1965-) physician, researcher and civil servant

== Politicians ==
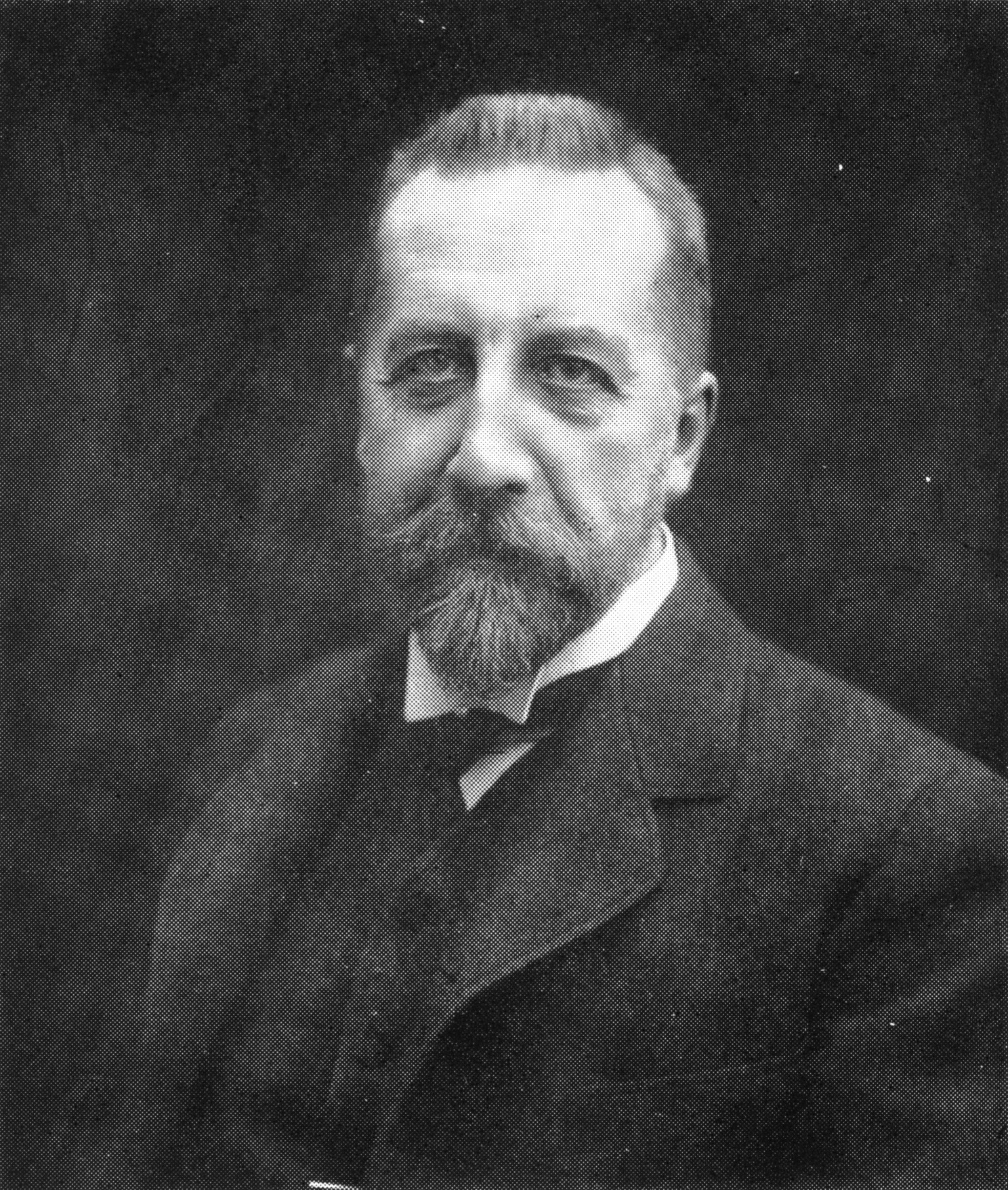
Christian Michelsen

- Jon Smør (1240–1328) knight and riksråd
- Svale Jonson Smør (1380–1442) knight and riksråd
- Trond Torleivsson Benkestok (1490–1558) nobleman
- Vilhelm Bornemann (1731–1801) Danish Judge Advocate General, chief of police and extraordinary Supreme Court justice
- Georg Wallace (1804-1890) elected to the Storting in 1850 for Bergen
- Christian Wilhelm Wisbech (1832–1897) elected to parliament in 1883 and 1889
- Johan Bernhard Andersen (1834–1878) was a Norwegian printer, newspaper editor and politician.
- Thorwald Klaudius Nelson (1849–1888) Norwegian American politician who served as in the California State Senate
- Christian Michelsen (1857–1925) ship owner, Prime Minister of Norway
- Peter Børseth (1864–1909) Norwegian-American civil governor of Leyte
- Albert Viljam Hagelin (1881–1946) politician for the Nasjonal Samling
- Herman Meinich (1868–1948) jurist and politician for the Conservative Party.
- Edward Indrehus (1873–1933), Norwegian-American politician and member of the Minnesota House of Representatives
- Ingvald B. Aase (1882–1948) trade unionist and politician for the Labour and Communist parties
- Carl Joachim Hambro (1885–1964) politician, President of Parliament
- Gulbrand Lunde (1901–1942) politician for the Nasjonal Samling
- Gunnar Rogstad (1916–2012) civil servant and diplomat
- Lasse Sigurd Seim (1943–2024) civil servant and diplomat
- Erna Solberg (1961-) 28th Prime Minister of Norway
- Kjetil Sælen (1969-) football referee
- Rune Bakervik (1970-) politician for the Labour Party
- Jørn Eggum (1972-) goldsmith and leader of the United Federation of Trade Unions
- Marte Mjøs Persen (1975-) member of the Cabinet of Norway
- Roger Valhammer (1984-) politician for the Labour Party
- Gyda Oddekalv (1993-) leader of Generasjonspartiet
- Linn Engø (1993-) mayor for the Labour Party

== Sport ==
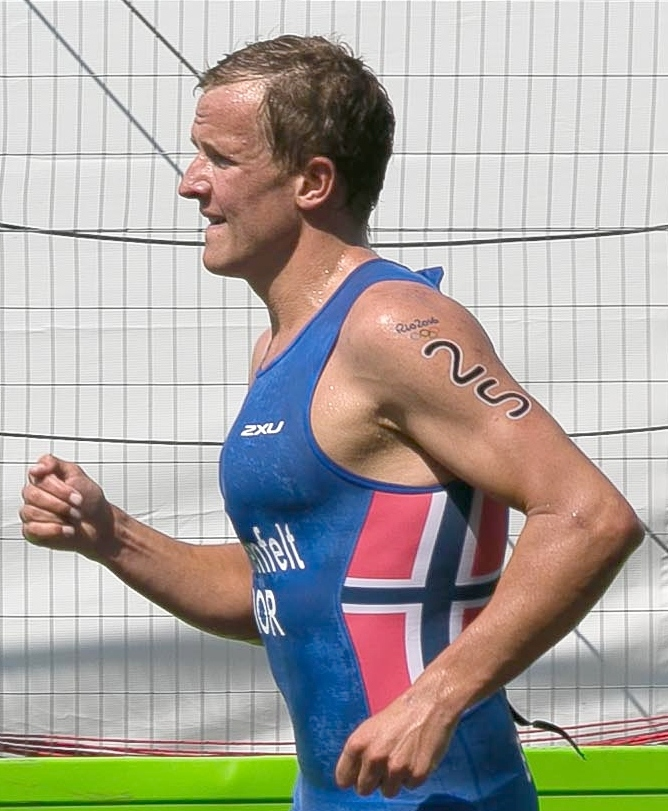
Kristian Blummenfelt, Rio 2016

- Roald Jensen (1943–1987) football player
- Terje Hauge (1965–) football referee
- Arne Sandstø (1966–) football manager
- Mia Hundvin (1977–) handballer
- Trude Gundersen (1977–) taekwondo athlete
- Erik Huseklepp (1984–) football player
- Nils Jakob Hoff (1985–) rower
- Alexander Dale Oen (1985–2012) swimmer
- Magnus Midtbø (1988–) climber
- Maren Mjelde (1989–) football player
- Andreas Bakkerud (1991–) rallycross driver
- Jakob Glesnes (1994–) football player
- Renate Blindheim (1994–) football manager
- Vilde Bøe Risa (1995–) football player
- Gustav Iden (1996–) triathlete
- Kristian Blummenfelt (1994–) triathlete
- Embla Matilde Njerve (2007-) pole vaulter

== Others ==
- Zacharias Allewelt (1682–1744) Norwegian-Danish sea captain and slave trader
- Maren Sars (1811–1898) socialite
- Ulrik Vilhelm Koren (1826–1910) Norwegian-American Lutheran church leader
- Nanna Storjohann (1838–1898) proponent for public morals
- Kristine Martine Johannessen (1855–1933) temperance leader and editor
- Mons Monssen (1867–1930) Norwegian-American sailor in the United States Navy who received the Medal of Honor
- Tryggve Gran (1898–1980) aviator, polar explorer and author
- Borghild Hammerich (1901–1978) activist most known for her humanitarian efforts during World War II
- Leif Andreas Larsen (1906–1990) naval officer
- Karsten Solheim (1911–2000) Norwegian-American Golf club designer and founder of PING
- Aslaug Haviland (1913–2003) known as "Utah's Helen Keller" was a deaf and blind motivational speaker
- Tikken Manus (1914 –2010) was a member of the Norwegian resistance during World War II.
- Max Manus (1914–1981) decorated resistance-fighter
- Per Grieg (1932–2024) ship broker and ship owner
- Magne Malmanger (1932–2023) was art historian
- Harald Tusberg (1935–2023) television personality, screenwriter, songwriter and author
- Kim Friele (1935–2021) gay rights and human rights activist
- Berit Moore (1937–2012) activist for sex education and disability rights
- Terje Rød-Larsen (1947–) diplomat, sociologist
- Morten Tyldum (1967-) film director
- Peter Sunde (1978–) entrepreneur, The Pirate Bay
- El Rubius (1990–) Rubén Gundersen, YouTube personality, the 49th most subscribed on YouTube
