= Ameln =

Ameln may refer to:

== Places ==
- Ameln, a district of the Municipality of Titz, North Rhine-Westphalia, Germany

== People with the surname ==
- Haakon Ameln (1881–1949), Norwegian businessperson
- Henrik Ameln (1879–1961), Norwegian jurist and politician
- Johan Gerhard Theodor Ameln (1838–1917), Norwegian merchant and politician
- Karl-Robert Ameln (1919–2016), Swedish sailor and Olympian
