= Søren Tjønneland =

Norwegian politician

Søren Tjønneland (1868–1949) was a Norwegian mason, trade unionist, and politician for the Labour Party and Social Democratic Labour parties.

He hailed from Tjønneland in Gaular Municipality, but moved to Bergen in 1890. He worked as a mason and chaired the local Labour Party branch, the masons' trade union and the newspaper Arbeidet. He was also a member of Bergen city council.

He stood for parliamentary elections several times. In 1909 he ran as Labour's deputy candidate in the constituency Nygaard, but lost. The same thing happened in 1912. In 1915 he fielded as Labour's top candidate in Nygaard, and won the first round of voting with 2,563 votes, against 2,446 for Jørgen Blydt and 2,056 for Henrik Ameln. However, in the subsequent runoff, he entered as the running mate of Johan Samuelsen. They nonetheless won and Tjønneland became a deputy representative to the Parliament of Norway during the term 1916–1918. From 1920 to 1922 he was a member of the national Housing Law Commission.

In 1921 Samuelsen headed the ballot of the new Social Democratic Labour Party; Tjønneland was listed in fourth place. In 1924 Tjønneland was the ninth candidate. The Social Democratic Labour Party reunited with Labour in 1927.

He was the father of later Mayor of Bergen, Knut Tjønneland.
