= Laland =

Laland is a surname. Notable people with this surname include:

- Kevin Laland (born 1962), English evolutionary biologist
- Søren Laland (1922–1998), Norwegian biochemist

== See also ==
- Lalande (disambiguation)
