= Geelmuyden =

Geelmuyden is a surname. Notable people with the surname include:

- August Geelmuyden Spørck (1851–1928), Norwegian military officer and politician for the Liberal Party
- Christian Torber Hegge Geelmuyden (1816–1885), Norwegian navy officer and politician
- Hans Geelmuyden (1844–1920), Norwegian astronomer
- Herman Geelmuyden (born 2002), Norwegian footballer
- Ivar Christian Sommerschild Geelmuyden (1819–1875), Norwegian politician
- Knud Geelmuyden Fleischer Maartmann (1821–1888), Norwegian politician
- Kristian Geelmuyden (born 1875), Norwegian politician for the Conservative Party
- Marie Geelmuyden (1856–1935), Norwegian chemist, teacher and textbook author, first Norwegian woman to receive a degree in science
- Niels Christian Geelmuyden (born 1960), Norwegian journalist and writer, mostly known for his interviews and essays
