= Stormoen =

Stormoen is a surname. Notable people with the surname include:

- Alfhild Stormoen (1883–1974), Norwegian actress and director
- Even Stormoen (born 1955), Norwegian stage actor
- Guri Stormoen (1901–1974), Norwegian actress
- Hans Stormoen (1906–1979), Norwegian actor
- Hans Marius Stormoen (1943–2006), Norwegian bass player, philologist, and actor
- Harald Stormoen (1872–1937), Norwegian actor
- Harald Stormoen (footballer) (born 1980), Norwegian footballer
- Helge Stormoen (born 1968), Norwegian politician
- Jake Stormoen, American actor
- Kjell Stormoen (1921–2010), Norwegian actor, scenographer and theatre director
