= Jørgen Blydt =

Norwegian politician (1868–1938)

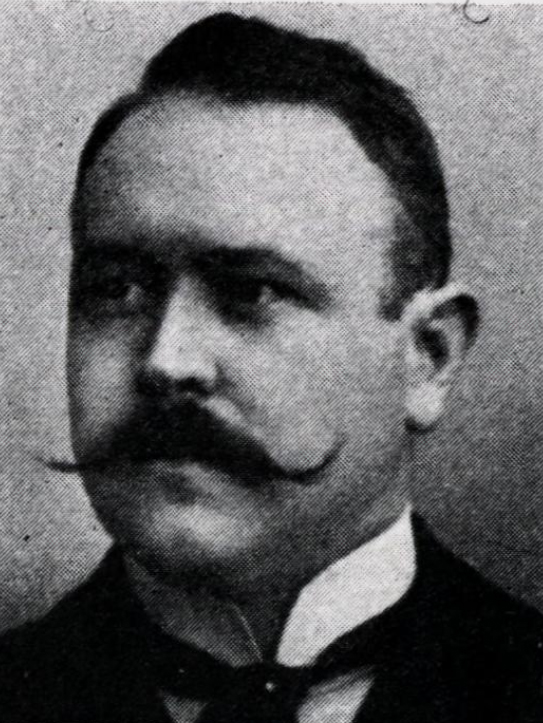
Jørgen Blydt (1868–1938), Norwegian businessman and politician

Jørgen Blydt (14 March 1868 – 28 April 1938) was a Norwegian businessperson and politician for the Liberal Party. He ran for parliamentary election in all four of Bergen county's constituencies at the time—Kalfaret, Nordnes, Sandviken and Nygaard—and served two terms as an MP (1900–1903 and 1916–1918). He ran a company with his brother-in-law, was a stock exchange commissary, and from 1932 to 1938 he was the Chancellor of the Order Council.

== Career ==
He was born in Bergen as a son of merchant Hans Schultz Blydt (1830–1916) and Maren Breder Hagelsteen (1834–1870). He finished Bergen Commerce School before taking education in France, England and Belgium between 1886 and 1889. He took over his father's company which traded in fishing and angling tools in 1891, and ran it together with his brother-in-law Hjalmar Grung as Blydt & Grung. He retired in 1929. From 1912 he was also a commissary for Bergen Stock Exchange.

He was a member of Bergen city council, and was first elected to the Parliament of Norway in 1899 from the plural-member constituency Bergen. In the 1906 he ran in the single-member constituency Kalfaret, and was elected deputy as the running mate of Johan Ludwig Mowinckel. The race was unusually close, with Mowinckel/Blydt edging out Lothe/Hanssen of the Coalition Party with 932 against 914 votes. In 1909 Blydt ran in Nordnes, but finished third behind Konow and Hopp. In 1912 Blydt ran in Sandviken, and finished second behind Labour's Lars Sæbø.

In the 1915 parliamentary election, Blydt ran in the last of Bergen's four constituencies, Nygaard, in the first round. He finished second (with 2,446 votes) behind Labour's S. K. Tjønneland (2,563 votes) but ahead of Conservative Henrik Ameln (2,056 votes). A runoff vote had to be held. However, both Blydt and Tjønneland were pulled from the race. The reason was that Blydt had run in Sandviken as well, and though finishing second behind Lars Sæbø again, he managed to reach the runoff here. In this runoff, Blydt won the seat with 3,836 votes against Sæbø's 3,429. He thus served a second term as an MP, and like fifteen years prior, he was a member of the Standing Committee on Trade.

Particularly during the First World War he was a member of numerous committees that sprang up as the state needed more control over enterprise. He chaired one of these committees, the Coal Provisioning Committee of 1917. He chaired Bergen Commercial Association for five years, and Bergen Chamber of Commerce from 1915 to 1926. Nationally, he was a board member of Den Norske Handelsstands Fællesforening from 1909 to 1916, and he was also a council member of the International Chamber of Commerce. He was a board member of Bergens Kreditbank (1906–1922), Fiskeribanken (1921–1936), Norges Oplysningskontor for Næringsveiene and the Norwegian America Line. He was a council member of the Chr. Michelsen Institute and a supervisory committee member of the Bergen Line.

In culture, he was a board member of Den Nationale Scene from 1913 to 1931, chairing it for the last two years. He was a member of the Order Council, which rewards the Order of St. Olav, from 1925, and served as vice chancellor in 1931 and chancellor from 1932 to his death in 1938.

Cultural offices
| Preceded by Joachim Grieg | Chair of the Den Nationale Scene; 1929–1931 | Succeeded by Haakon Ameln |
| Preceded by Kai Møller | Chancellor of the Order Council; 1932–1938 | Succeeded by Sem Sæland |
