= List of mayors of Bergen =

This is a list of mayors of Bergen, Norway.

Since 2000, the city is governed by a city council (byråd) based on the principle of parliamentarism. This change led to the real political power in the city being transferred from the mayor to the leader of the city council.

== 19th century ==
- 1. 1837–1838: Carsten B. Conradi
- 2. 1839–1841: Hans J. C. Aall
- 3. 1842: Georg H. Houge
- 4. 1843–1844: Hans J. C. Aall
- 5. 1845: Hans Holmboe
- 6. 1846: Hans J. C. Aall
- 7. 1847: Hans Holmboe
- 8. 1848: Joachim J. M. Ege
- 9. 1849–1850: Hans Holmboe
- 10. 1851: Joachim J. M. Ege
- 11. 1852–1853: Paul M. Smit
- 12. 1854: Ole Bøgh
- 13. 1855–1856: Paul M. Smit
- 14. 1857: Ole Bøgh
- 15. 1858–1859: Paul M. Smit
- 16. 1860: Boe N. Knap
- 17. 1861: Joachim J. M. Ege
- 18. 1862: Jørgen B. Faye
- 19. 1863–1864: Paul M. Smit
- 20. 1865–1866: Jacob A. Michelsen
- 21. 1867–1868: Ivar Chr. S. Geelmuyden
- 22. 1869–1872: Morten Beyer
- 23. 1873–1875: Ivar Chr. S. Geelmuyden
- 24. 1876–1878: Jacob A. Michelsen
- 25. 1879: Gerhard Chr. Krogh
- 26. 1880–1881: Christian A. Irgens
- 27. 1882: Knud A. Angell
- 28. 1883–1885: Bendix E. R. Bendixen (V)
- 29. 1886–1887: Johan G. T. Ameln (V)
- 30. 1888–1890: John Theodor Lund (V)
- 31. 1891: Gerhard. Chr. Krogh (V)
- 32. 1892–1893: Christian Michelsen (H)
- 33. 1894: Klaus Hanssen (V)
- 34. 1895–1898: Christian Michelsen (V)
- 35. 1899–1901: Christian M. Kahrs (V)

== 20th century ==
- 36. 1902–1906: Johan Ludwig Mowinckel (V)
- 37. 1907–1910: Carl V. E. Geelmuyden (V)
- 38. 1911–1913: Johan Ludwig Mowinckel (V)
- 39. 1914–1916: Carl V. E. Geelmuyden (V)
- 40. 1917: Einar Greve (V)
- 41. 1918–1919: Kristian Hopp (A)
- 42. 1920–1922: Henrik Ameln (H)
- 43. 1923–1924: Hans Kristian Seip (Avholdspartiet)
- 44. 1925: Julius Moe-Nilsen (H + Fr.V)
- 45. 1926–1932: Ragnvald J. Lorentzen (H + Fr.V + Huseierpartiet)
- 46. 1932–1934: Leif M. Michelsen (V)
- 47. 1935–1942: Asbjørn Stensaker (H)
- 48. 1945: Asbjørn Stensaker (H)
- 49. 1945–1953: Nils Handal (A)
- 50. 1953–1960: Knut Tjønneland (A)
- 51. 1960–1963: August D. Michelsen (H)
- 52. 1964–1969: Harry Hansen (A)
- 53. 1969–1971: Ragnar Juell Morken (A)
- 54. 1972–1973: Ole Myrvoll (DLF)
- 55. 1973–1983: Eilert Eilertsen (H)
- 56. 1984–1985: Arne Næss (KrF)
- 57. 1986–1987: Henrik J. Lisæth (H)
- 58. 1988–1989: Arne Næss (KrF)
- 59. 1989–1995: Bengt Martin Olsen (A)
- 60. 1995–1999: Ingmar Ljones (KrF)
- 61. 1999–2000: Anne-Grete Strøm-Erichsen (A)

== 21st century ==
- 62. 2000–2001: Ingmar Ljones (KrF)
- 63. 2001–2003: Kristian Helland (KrF)
- 64. 2003–2007: Herman Friele (H)
- 65. 2007–2011: Gunnar Bakke (FrP)
- 66. 2011–2015: Trude Drevland (H)
- 67. 2015–2021: Marte Mjøs Persen (A)
- 68. 2021–2022: Rune Bakervik (A)
- 69. 2022–2023: Linn Engø (A)
- 70. 2023–present: Marit Warncke (H)
