= Sæbø =

Sæbø may refer to:

== Places ==
- Sæbø Municipality, a former municipality in Vestland county, Norway
- Sæbø, Vestland, a village in Alver municipality in Vestland county, Norway
- Sæbø Church, a church in Alver municipality in Vestland county, Norway
- Sæbø, Møre og Romsdal, a village in Ørsta municipality in Møre og Romsdal county, Norway
- Sæbø, Rogaland, a village in the Finnøy area of Stavanger municipality in Rogaland county, Norway

== People ==
- Lars Sæbø, a Norwegian trade unionist and politician for the Labour Party
- Magne Sæbø (born 1929), a Norwegian biblical scholar specializing in the Old Testament

== Other ==
- Sæbø sword, a 9th-century Viking sword found in Vik, Norway
