= Arne Næss (disambiguation) =

Arne Naess may refer to:

- Arne Næss (1912–2009), philosopher, mountaineer, and founder of deep ecology
- Arne Næss Jr. (1937–2004), nephew of the above, businessman, mountaineer, husband of Diana Ross
- Arne Lindtner Næss (born 1944), Norwegian actor and filmmaker
- Arne Næss (politician) (1925–2009), Norwegian politician
