= Gyldenkrantz =

- Nobility
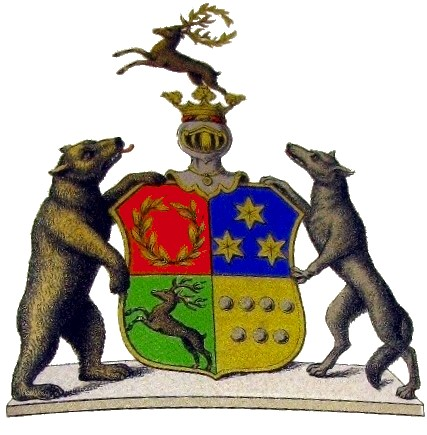
- Coat of arms of the Gyldenkrantz family
- Parent family: Geelmuyden family
- Country: Denmark; Norway
- Place of origin: the Netherlands
- Founded: 29 January 1783
- Founder: Joachim Geelmuyden
- Titles: Notarius publicus
- Estate: Damsgård Manor

The Gyldenkrantz family was a Danish and Norwegian noble family of Dutch origin. The family became patrilineally extinct after some generations.

== History ==
=== Before the ennoblement ===
Joachim Christian Gertsen Geelmuyden (1730-1795) was born in Nordhordaland and grew up in Bergen, Norway. He belonged to a family of officials; his father was a parish priest and an official and his grandfather was a merchant. The Geelmuyden family was originally from the Netherlands. Joachim Geelmuyden attended Bergen Cathedral School in 1746 and continued in 1749 with theology studies. By 1752 he had also completed law studies, but without graduating.

In 1754 he became Vice-City Manager of Bergen. He continued in 1755 as notarius publicus. In 1758 he was General Manager of Customs in Bergen and Stavanger. In 1760 he was awarded cand.jur. by the University of Copenhagen. In 1765 he became General Commissary of War and in 1766 he became City Manager of Bergen. Joachim Geelmuyden was a wealthy man, owning properties in Bergen as well as Damsgård Manor (Damsgård hovedgård). He married in 1753 Elisabeth Both (22 June 1731 – 6 May 1800), together with whom he had the son Hans Both Joachimsen Geelmuyden (10 July 1759- 8 May 1813).

=== After the ennoblement ===
On 29 January 1783 Joachim Geelmuyden and his family were ennobled under the name Gyldenkrantz ' meaning "Golden Wreath". Their son Hans Gyldenkrantz (1759- 1813) entered into marriage with Frederikke Louise von Linstow (27 June 1759 – 20 August 1788), who was the daughter of Hartvig Christoph von Linstow and Cathrine Eleonore Fredrichsdatter Lohmann in Bergen. The couple had a son Joachim Christian Gyldenkrantz the younger (1786–1845).

== Coat of arms ==
Arms of the Gyldenkrantz family. Drawer: Commons-user Ssolbergj

Description: In the first of four fields, on a red shield a golden laurel wreath. In the second field, on a blue shield three (one over two) six-pointed golden stars. In the third field, on a green shield a brown hart rampant. In the fourth field, on a golden shield seven (four over three) silver balls. On the helm a noble coronet, and up from the coronet a brown hart rampant. Supporters: a bear to the dexter and a wolf to the sinister.

Before the ennoblement, Joachim Gyldenkrantz used the Geelmuyden arms, which display on a green shield a brown hart rampant three (one over two) six-pointed golden stars.

== See also ==
- Danish nobility
- Norwegian nobility

== Other sources ==
- A. Thiset og P.L. Wittrup: Nyt dansk Adelslexikon, Copenhagen 1904
- Sven Tito Achen: Danske adelsvåbener, Copenhagen 1973
- Dansk biografisk lexikon: Gyldenkrantz, Joachim Christian Geelmuyden

== External information ==
- Skeel.info: Gyldenkrantz Coat of Arms
