= Ragnvald Dahl =

Norwegian civil servant and politician (1938–2018)

- Born: 13 July 1938
- Died: 25 February 2018 (aged 79)
- Occupations: Civil servant Politician

Ragnvald Dahl (13 July 1938 – 25 February 2018) was a Norwegian civil servant and politician.

He was elected deputy representative to the Storting from Oslo for the period 1969–1973 for the Conservative Party. In total he met during 1 day of parliamentary session.

Party political offices
Preceded by Henrik J. Lisæth	Chairman of the Norwegian Young Conservatives; 1965–1969	Succeeded by Hans Svelland
