= Benjamin Jakobsen (politician) =

Norwegian politician (born 1996)

- Born: 8 September 1996 (age 29)
- Occupation: Politician
- Political party: Labour Party

Benjamin Jakobsen (born 8 September 1996) is a Norwegian politician for the Labour Party. A deputy representative to the Storting, he has met permanently since June 2023.

== Political career ==
=== Civic career ===
Outside of his work in politics, Jakobsen is an employee of the Norwegian Humanist Association.

=== Local politics ===
He has been a member of the municipal council of Askøy since 2015, having been re-elected in 2019.

=== Parliament ===
He was elected as a deputy representative to the Storting from the constituency of Hordaland at the 2021 election, for the Labour Party. He replaced Marte Mjøs Persen in the Storting from June until October 2023 while Persen was in government and later Lubna Jaffery as well. In the Storting, he was a member of the Standing Committee on Scrutiny and Constitutional Affairs between June and October 2023.
