= Norsk pop & rock-leksikon =

Norsk pop & rock-leksikon is Norwegian biographical encyclopaedia covering the last 100 years of Norwegian music.

The encyclopaedia was issued in 2005 by the publishing house Vega forlag. The initiator was Jan Eggum, who co-edited the encyclopedia along with Bård Ose and Siren Steen. It contains around 1,300 articles.
