= Ragnhild Stolt-Nielsen =

Norwegian politician and political scientist

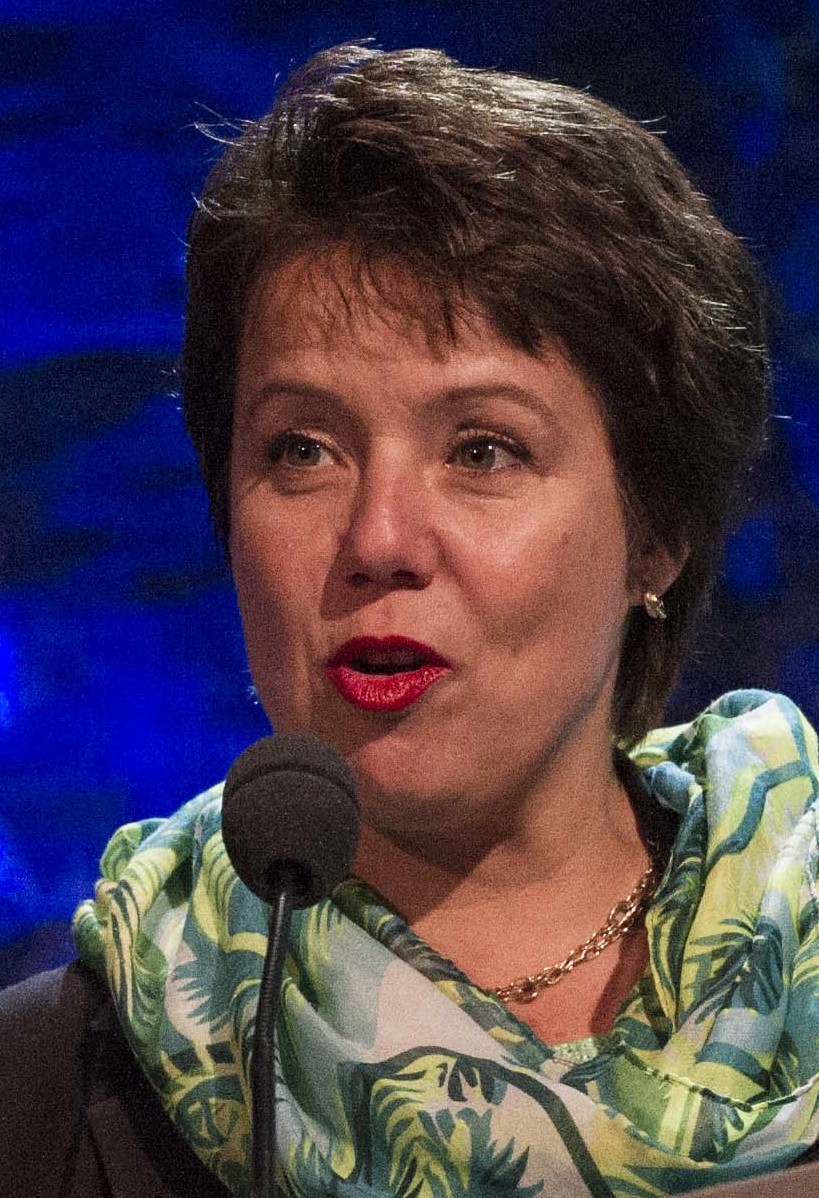

Chief Commissioner of Bergen
- In office 17 October 2013 – 20 October 2014
- Mayor: Trude Drevland
- Preceded by: Monica Mæland
- Succeeded by: Martin Smith-Sivertsen

First Deputy Leader of the Vestland Conservative Party
- Incumbent
- Assumed office 7 March 2012
- Leader: Liv Kari Eskeland; Peter Frølich; Tom Georg Indrevik
- Preceded by: Henning Warloe

Personal details
- Born: 16 April 1969 (age 57) Haugesund, Rogaland, Norway
- Party: Conservative
- Occupation: Politician; Political scientist

Ragnhild Stolt-Nielsen (born 16 April 1969) is a Norwegian politician, political scientist, and academic administrator of the Conservative Party. She served as Bergen's Chief Commissioner from 2013 to 2014 when she lost her nomination for the 2015 local elections to Martin Smith-Sivertsen.

== Life and career ==
Stolt-Nielsen earned a master's degree in political science from the University of Bergen in 1995.

Stolt-Nielsen was elected to the city council of Bergen in 1999, and she held that position until 2003. During that period she was chair of the council steering committee. She was again elected to city council in 2007, and she served as City Council Leader from 2013 to 2014. From 2007 until 2011 she was deputy chair of the council's child welfare committee, and beginning in 2011 she was the chair of the finance committee and the leader of the conservative caucus. She left office in 2014.

Stolt-Nielsen was the first Deputy Chair of the Bergen Conservative Party from 2005 to 2007, and was the first Deputy Chair of the Hordaland Conservative Party for a term starting in 2012. She was the second Deputy Representative to the Storting from Hordaland in the term 2009–2013, during which time she served for 9 days in the Storting.

Stolt-Nielsen subsequently became the Head of Administration at The Bjerknes Centre for Climate Research at the University of Bergen. In 2015, she was hired to direct interdisciplinary initiatives at the university.

Ragnhild Stolt-Nielsen's mother is the former parliamentary representative Inger Stolt-Nielsen.
