= Herman Friele =

Norwegian politician

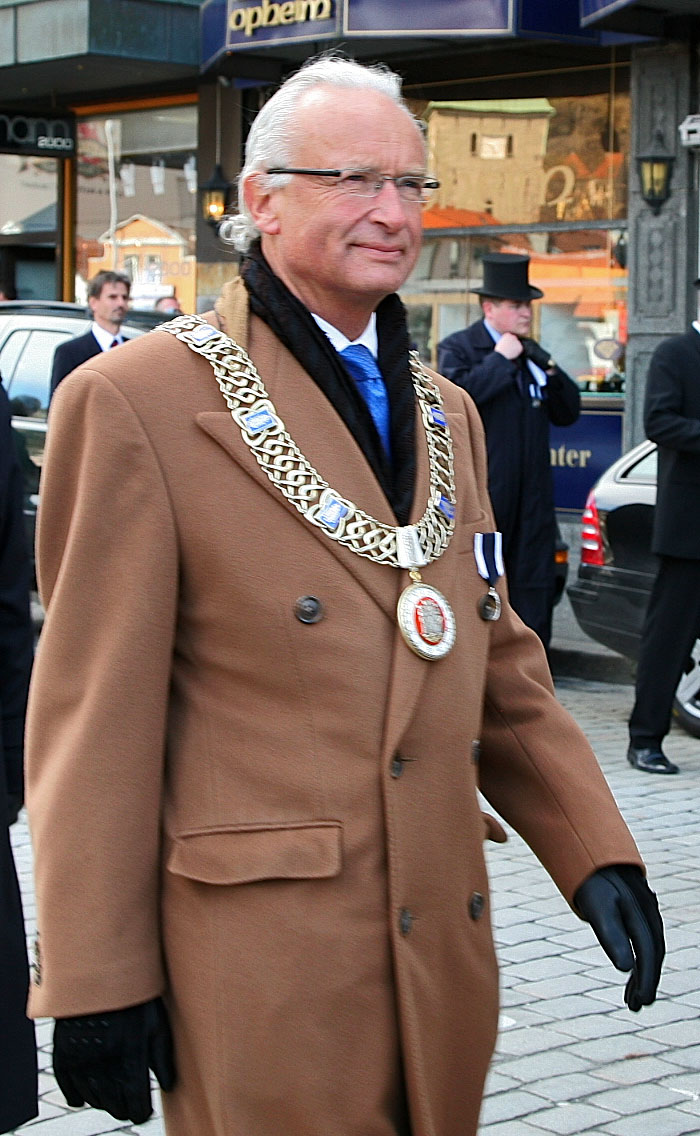
- Friele in April 2007

Mayor of Bergen
- In office 27 October 2003 – 29 October 2007
- Deputy: Kristian Helland
- Preceded by: Kristian Helland
- Succeeded by: Gunnar Bakke

Personal details
- Born: 21 August 1943 (age 82) Bergen, Norway
- Party: Conservative

Herman Friele (born 21 August 1943) is a Norwegian businessman and politician for the Conservative Party. He has been chairman of the coffee manufacturer Friele since 1981, as the seventh generation Friele in charge of the company. He was the highly popular mayor of Bergen from 2003 to 2007.

Before the 2003 election, a survey found that 64% of the inhabitants of Bergen wanted him to become the mayor after the election. When Friele announced that he would not be running for mayor in the 2007 election, a survey showed that 60% of the inhabitants of Bergen wanted him to continue in the job.

Preceded by Kristian Helland	Mayor of Bergen; 2003–2007	Succeeded by Gunnar Bakke
