= Dag Ole Teigen =

Norwegian politician

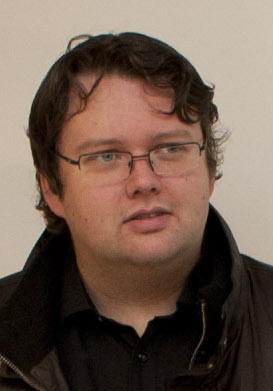

Member of the Norwegian Parliament
- Incumbent
- Assumed office 17 October 2005
- Constituency: Hordaland

Personal details
- Born: 10 August 1982 (age 43) Volda
- Party: Norwegian Labour Party

Dag Ole Teigen (born 10 August 1982 in Volda) is a Norwegian politician for the Labour Party (AP). He represented Hordaland in the Norwegian Parliament, where he met from 2005 to 2009 in the place of Anne-Grete Strøm-Erichsen, who was appointed to a government position. He was elected on his own right to serve a full term from 2009 to 2013.

Teigen was a member of the Standing Committee on Health and Care Services from 2005 to 2009, and a member of the Standing Committee on Finance and Economic Affairs from 2009 to 2013.

He holds a master's degree in public policy and management from the University of Agder (2014), and a Bachelor of Arts from the University of Bergen (2004). He participated at The Oxford Experience in 2013.

He was elected to the municipal council of Fjell Municipality in 2003. He is a member of Mensa.

== Parliamentary Committee duties ==
- 2005 - 2009 member of the Standing Committee on Health and Care Services.
- 2009 - 2013 member of the Standing Committee on Finance and Economic Affairs.
