= Rune Bakervik =

Norwegian politician

Chief Commissioner of Bergen
- In office 3 November 2022 – 30 October 2023
- Mayor: Linn Engø; Marit Warncke
- Preceded by: Roger Valhammer
- Succeeded by: Christine B. Meyer

Mayor of Bergen
- In office 22 September 2021 – 27 October 2022
- Deputy: Linn Engø
- Chief Commissioner: Roger Valhammer
- Preceded by: Marte Mjøs Persen
- Succeeded by: Linn Engø

Deputy Mayor of Bergen
- In office 30 October 2019 – 22 September 2021
- Mayor: Marte Mjøs Persen
- Preceded by: Marita Moltu
- Succeeded by: Linn Engø

Bergen City Commissioner for Urban Development
- In office 24 June 2019 – 29 October 2019
- Chief Commissioner: Roger Valhammer
- Preceded by: Anna Elisa Tryti
- Succeeded by: Ingrid Neergaard Fjeldstad (2022)

Personal details
- Born: 19 November 1970 (age 55) Laksevåg, Hordaland, Norway
- Party: Labour
- Children: 1

Rune Bakervik (born 19 November 1970) is a Norwegian politician for the Labour Party. He served as Chief Commissioner of Bergen from 2022 to 2023, and previously served as mayor, deputy mayor and city commissioner for urban development.

== Background ==
Bakervik was born in Laksevåg, but grew up in Fyllingsdalen. He studied social science and later started with a major in sociology, but didn't finish it. He later took further education in labour law and management. He has been the regional leader for the Union of Employees in Commerce and Offices since 2011.

In his personal time, Bakervik has supported the SK Brann football team. He has also been a leader of the fan club and tournament leader. He is married and has one child.

== Political career ==
=== City council ===
Bakervik was elected to the Bergen City Council in 2003. From 2015 to 2019, he was the Labour Party's group leader in the city council and leader of the Bergen Labour Party from 2010 to 2019.

=== Parliament ===
Bakervik was elected as deputy representative to the Norwegian Parliament, the Storting, following the 2009 parliamentary election for the constituency of Hordaland. He served the complete term until 2013. He was later re-elected, this time as a regular representative, to the Storting for the same constituency at the 2025 election. From 2006 to 2009, he was also a political advisor to Minister of Defence Anne-Grete Strøm-Erichsen.

=== City commissioner ===
On 24 June 2019, Bakervik was appointed city commissioner for urban development following the resignation of Anna Elisa Tryti.

When Roger Valhammer formed his new cabinet following the 2019 local elections, Bakervik was dismissed from his position in order to become deputy mayor.

=== Deputy mayor ===
Bakervik was elected deputy mayor of Bergen following the 2019 local elections and succeeded Marita Moltu in the position.

=== Mayor of Bergen ===
With then-mayor Marte Mjøs Persen nominated as a candidate for parliament ahead of the 2021 parliamentary election, the Bergen Labour Party chose Bakervik as their new mayoral candidate along with Linn Engø as the deputy mayor candidate. Both Bakervik and Engø officially assumed office on 22 September after Persen resigned as mayor after being elected to parliament. In October 2022, following Roger Valhammer's announced resignation, Bakervik asked Engø to step in to consider new chief commissioner candidates in his place. Bakervik handed her the responsibility because he was among the preferred candidates up for consideration.

=== Chief commissioner of Bergen ===
Engø would later give Bakervik the responsibility of forming a new city government. She then ascended to the mayoralty when he resigned on 27 October in preparation to take over as chief commissioner. Bakervik officially took over on 3 November, where Labour had formed a government with the Liberal Party.

The Liberal Party withdrew from the government on 14 September 2023 to negotiate with the Conservatives and the Christian Democrats about forming a Conservative led government following the 2023 local elections. He appointed himself as city commissioner for finance and business and ownership, while Ruth Grung additionally took on the responsibility of environment and urban development.

Initially the election result didn't give either of the two blocks a majority, but the Conservative one became the largest. Despite this, Bakervik started negotiations with parties that supported him as chief commissioner. However, this later fell through when the Conservatives managed to form a majority with the Centre Party, Progress Party, Pensioners' Party, Industry and Business Party and the Bergen List.

Bakervik announced his government's resignation on 18 October, while also attacking the Conservatives for being unwilling to find common ground in a potential resolution for the Bergen Light Rail. The Conservatives meanwhile expressed that Labour's offer came to late and "wasn't generous enough". His government remained as a caretaker government until Christine B. Meyer and her government took over on 30 October.
