= Trude Drevland =

Norwegian politician (born 1947)

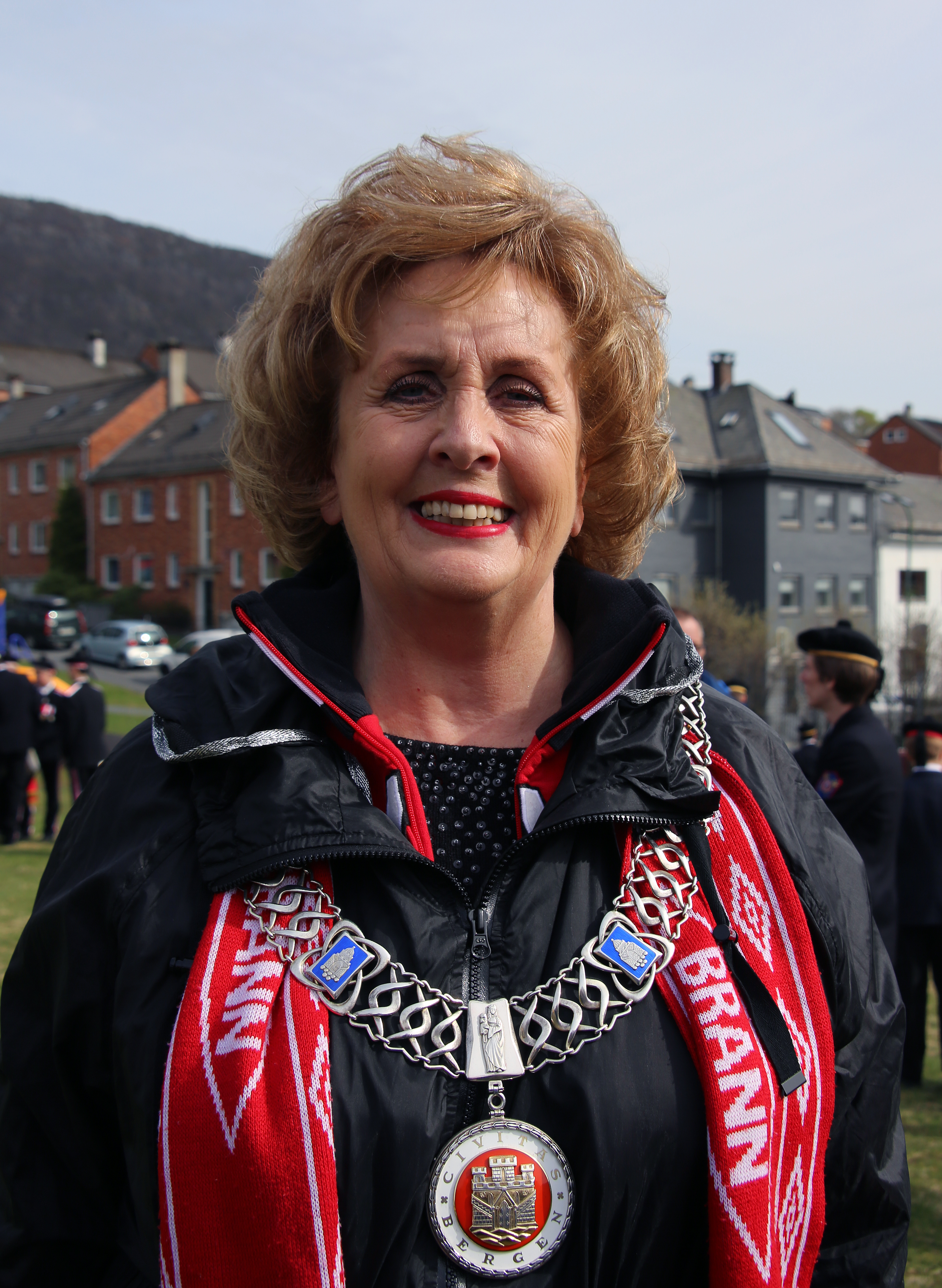

Mayor of Bergen
- In office 31 October 2011 – 28 October 2015
- Deputy: Tor A. Woldseth
- Preceded by: Gunnar Bakke
- Succeeded by: Marte Mjøs Persen

Deputy Mayor of Bergen
- In office 29 October 2007 – 31 October 2011
- Mayor: Gunnar Bakke
- Preceded by: Kristian Helland
- Succeeded by: Tor A. Woldseth

Bergen City Commissioner for Health and Social Affairs
- In office 27 October 2003 – 29 October 2007

Personal details
- Born: 27 May 1947 (age 78) Melbu, Hadsel, Nordland, Norway
- Party: Conservative
- Occupation: Nurse

Trude Drevland (born 27 May 1947) is a Norwegian nurse and politician from the Conservative Party. She was the mayor of Bergen Municipality between 2011 and 2015 and deputy mayor from 2007 to 2011.

== Biography ==
She was born in Melbu in Hadsel Municipality, Nordland, on 27 May 1947. She was trained as a nurse and served as the general manager of the Fyllingsdalen nursing home. Then she became the head of business policy in the Bergen Business Council, and the general secretary of the Norwegian Music Corps Association. She was head of the Bergen branch of the Conservative Party from 1996 to 1998.

She was a member of the county council in Hordaland between 1991 and 2003 and a member of the city council for health and social care in Bergen between 2003 and 2007, while concurrently serving as the Bergen City commissioner for health and social affairs. She served as a member of the Bergen city council from 2007 to 2015. She was deputy mayor of Bergen between 2007 and 2011, succeeding Kristian Helland. She was elected as the mayor of Bergen in 2011, replacing Gunnar Bakke in the post. During her tenure Tor A. Woldseth was the deputy mayor.

Drevland resigned from office in 2015 when she was charged with corruption accepting favors from the cruise line Viking Cruises. Drevland denied corruption, and the public prosecutor in Hordaland dropped the case in 2016. Marte Mjøs Persen replaced her as mayor of Bergen.

Between 2015 and 2019 Drevland was a member of the city council. She is the sister of actor Lars Andreas Larssen.

Political offices
Preceded by Gunnar Bakke	Mayor of Bergen; 2011–2015	Succeeded by Marte Mjøs Persen
Preceded by Kristian Helland	Deputy Mayor of Bergen; 2007–2011	Succeeded by Tor A. Woldseth
Preceded by Helen Fløisand	Bergen City Commissioner for Health and Social Affairs; 2003–2007	Succeeded by Liv Røssland
