= Henrik J. Lisæth =

Norwegian politician (born 1933)

Henrik Johan Lisæth (born 11 March 1933) is a Norwegian businessperson and politician from the Conservative Party.

== Early life ==
He was born in Bergen as a son of salesman Henrik Lisæth (1890–1964) and housewife Gunhild Paulsen (1896–1985). He graduated from the Leeds College of Commerce in 1957 and from the Norwegian School of Economics and Business Administration with the siv.øk. degree in 1960.

He was an able long distance runner before graduation. In 1957 he achieved the results 15:27.8 minutes in the 5000 metres and 33:00.2 in the 10,000 metres. He represented the club TIF Viking. In 1958 he improved to 32:42.0 minutes.

== Political career ==
In 1965 he was the leader of the Young Conservatives (Unge Høyre), the youth wing of the Conservative Party. He was appointed as a State Secretary in the Ministry of Transport and Communications from 1965 to 1966, during Borten's Cabinet. He served as a deputy representative to the Parliament of Norway during the term 1965–1969, but met as a regular representative for Edvard Hambro from 1966. He was elected to the Parliament of Norway from the constituency Bergen in 1969, but was not re-elected in 1973. He was present on the party ballot, but in 20th and last place. At that point the constituency Bergen had been incorporated into Hordaland.

On the local level he was a member of Bergen city council during the term 1963–1967. He later became deputy mayor from 1983 to 1985, then mayor from 1986 to 1987, before returning as a council member from 1987 to 1990. From 1979 to 1983 he was a member of Hordaland county council. He chaired the countywide party chapter from 1972 to 1975, and the city chapter from 1977 to 1983. He was a member of the Conservative Party central committee in 1965 and from 1972 to 1975.

== Other positions ==
He spent parts of his career in insurance, being director of Storebrand and associated companies in Bergen. He was the local director from 1971 to 1981 and regional director from 1981 to 1983. From 1990 to 2000 he was the chief executive of the Chr. Michelsen Institute.

In his early career, Lisæth was a board member of Norske Siviløkonomers Forening from 1966 to 1970 and Minerva Forlag from 1966 to 1969. Locally in Bergen he was chairman of the local trading association from 1977 to 1979, board member of the company Institutt for Byfornying from 1979 to 1984, Haukeland University Hospital from 1980 to 1986, the county school board from 1980 to 1982, the Chr. Michelsen Institute from 1986 to 1990, the Bergen International Festival from 1986 to 1987 (and 1989 to 1994 as deputy chairman), the Bergen Philharmonic Orchestra from 1988 to 1990 and 1993 to 1998, Bergen's cinematographer from 1988 to 1990 and Bergens Kunstforening from 1992 to 1996. From 1985 to 1990 he led a committee that tried, successfully, to have the new television channel TV 2 located to Bergen.

Nationally he was a board member of Folketrygdfondet from 1988 to 1998. He was a board member of the Norwegian Cancer Association from 1998 to 2001, and deputy chair from 2001 to 2004. He was a member of the supervisory board of Bergen Bank from 1988 to 1990, Vital from 1993 to 1999 (chairing this board in 1999), Bergen International Festival from 1994 to 2001, Nera from 1995 to 2004 (chairing it from 1998 to 2004) and DnB NOR from 2000. Internationally he was a member of the executive committee of the International Urban Development Association (INTA) from 1984 to 1987, and was then vice president from 1987 to 1991 and president from 1991 to 1995.

Party political offices
Preceded by Torstein Tynning	Leader of Norwegian Young Conservatives; 1965	Succeeded by Ragnvald Dahl
Political offices
Preceded by Arne Næss	Mayor of Bergen; 1986–1987	Succeeded by Arne Næss
