= Knut Tjønneland =

Norwegian politician

Knut Tjønneland (1907 – 2002) was a Norwegian politician for the Labour Party.

He was a son of fellow Labour politician Søren Tjønneland. He attended Tanks Upper Secondary School. During the occupation of Norway by Nazi Germany, he was imprisoned.

He is known as mayor of Bergen, the second largest city in Norway, from 1953 to 1960. He was also deputy mayor in 1950–1953 and 1960–1961. During his period as mayor, Bergen bought the district Fyllingsdalen from Fana municipality, and the Puddefjord Bridge was constructed.

Political offices
| Preceded by Nils Handal | Mayor of Bergen; 1953–1960 | Succeeded by August D. Michelsen |
