= Ingmar Ljones =

Norwegian politician (born 1943)

- Born: December 3, 1943 (age 82)
- Occupation: politician

Ingmar Ljones (born 3 December 1943 in Strandebarm Municipality) is a Norwegian politician for the Christian Democratic Party.

He was elected to the Norwegian Parliament from Hordaland in 2001, but was not re-elected in 2005. He then served in the position of deputy representative during the term 2005–2009.

Ljones held various positions in the municipal council for Bergen Municipality from 1979 to 2001, serving as deputy mayor in 1991–1995 and 1999–2000 as well as mayor in 1995–1999 and 2000–2001.

Political offices
Preceded by Bengt Martin Olsen	Mayor of Bergen; 1995–1999	Succeeded by Anne-Grete Strøm-Erichsen
Preceded by Anne-Grete Strøm-Erichsen	Mayor of Bergen; 2000–2001	Succeeded by Kristian Helland
