= Helge Stormoen =

Norwegian politician (born 1968)

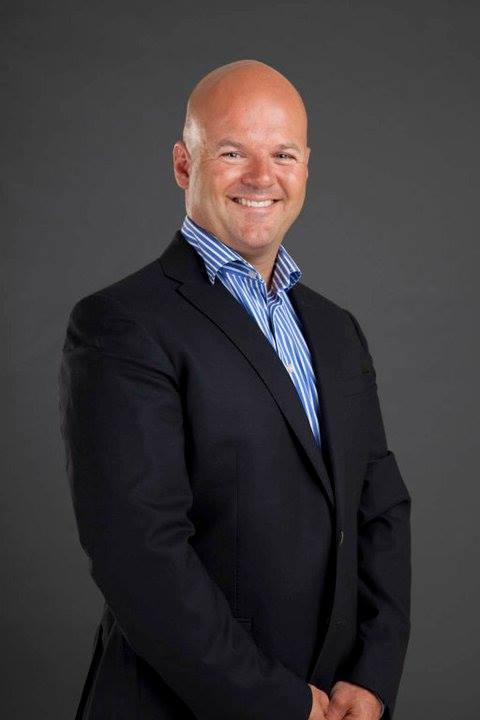
Helge Stormoen

Helge Stormoen (born 1968) is a Norwegian politician for the Progress Party.

He was elected to Bergen city council in 2003, and steadily re-elected. In 2014, he was appointed as City Commissioner of Culture and Enterprise, succeeding Gunnar Bakke who was sacked by governing mayor Ragnhild Stolt-Nielsen.

Stormoen is a grandnephew of Kjell Stormoen and a first cousin once removed of Even Stormoen.

Political offices
Preceded by Gunnar Bakke	Bergen City Commissioner of Culture and Enterprise; 2014–2015	Succeeded by Julie Andersland
