= Marie Geelmuyden =

Norwegian chemist and teacher (1856–1935)

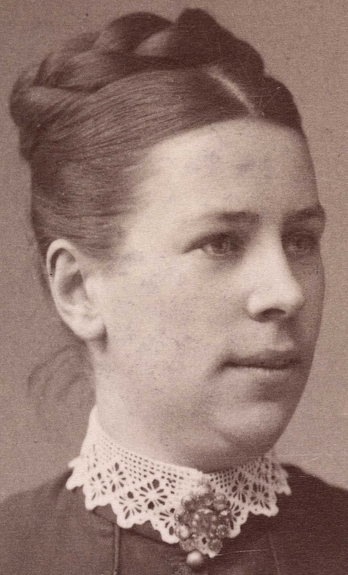
- Marie Geelmuyden, c.1880
- Born: 1856 July 22; Horten, Norway
- Died: 1935 May 21
- Education: Nissen Governess School
- Parents: Christian Hegge Geelmuyden (father); Jensine Sophie Horn (mother)
- Scientific career
- Fields: Chemistry

Marie Geelmuyden (born 22 July 1856 in Horten, died 21 May 1935) was a Norwegian chemist, teacher and textbook author. She was the first Norwegian woman to receive a degree in science.

== Biography ==
She was the daughter of Christian Torber Hegge Geelmuyden (1816-1885) and Jensine Sophie Horn (1825-1913). The father was from the Dutch Geelmuyden family and was a naval commander, author of science textbooks and mayor of Horten. The mother was the daughter of a customs inspector in Risør. Marie Geelmuyden was the niece of Ivar Geelmuyden elected to the Norwegian Parliament in 1857, representing the constituency of Fredrikshald.

Marie Geelmuyden graduated as a governess from the Nissen governess school in 1878.

She passed the examen artium in 1883, and the examen philosophicum in 1884. The following year her father died and she began to study science at the university. Her classmates included Cecilie Thoresen Krog, Minda Ramm, Sofie Honoria Bonnevie (later married to Vilhelm Bjerknes) and Ragna Dons. She also played an active role in the student community and was elected the first female president of the Student Scientific Society (“Realistforeningen”) in 1892.

Marie Geelmuyden wrote about her time as a student in the article “Kammeratsliv blandt realister i 80-aarene”, which was printed in the book “Kvindelige studenters jubilæumsskrift”.

Marie Geelmuyden graduated as a candidatus realium in 1890. In 1903 she studied at the Sorbonne University in Paris. But she did not pursue a scientific career. After getting married and having children, she taught domestic subjects in local girls' schools.

Later she became a science teacher in the Royal Norwegian Society for Development schools throughout the country. In 1909, the national school for housekeeping teachers (“Statens husstellærerhøgskole”) in Stabekk, was established. Marie Geelmuyden was employed at the school the same year and thus became one of the first teachers at the school. She wrote a chemistry book for apprentice housewives: “Kjemi for husholdningsskoler”. She worked at the Stabekk school until 1926.
