= Linn Engø =

Politician from Norway

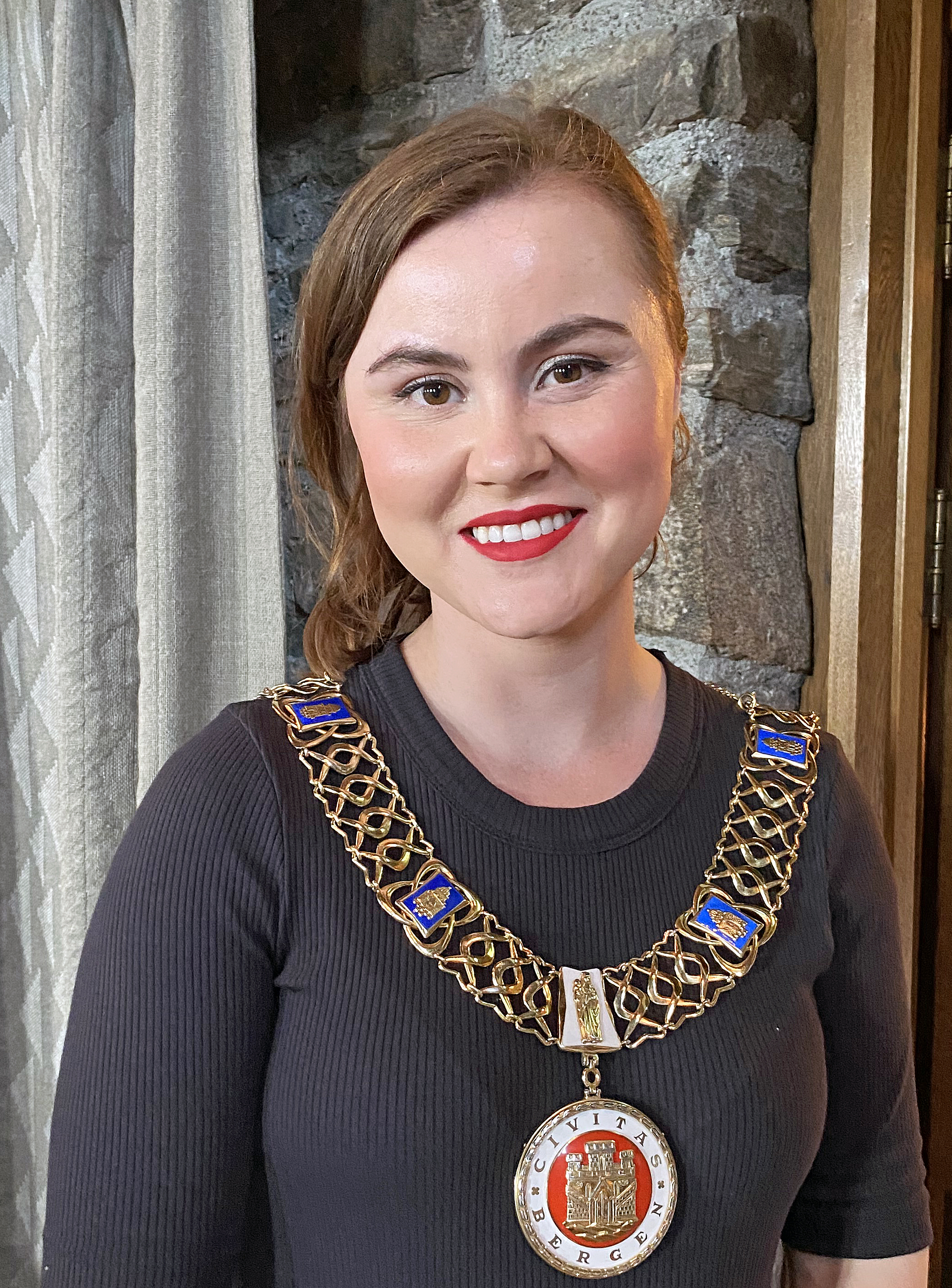

Mayor of Bergen
- In office 27 October 2022 – 25 October 2023
- Deputy: Eira Garrido
- Chief Commissioner: Roger Valhammer; Rune Bakervik
- Preceded by: Rune Bakervik
- Succeeded by: Marit Warncke

Deputy Mayor of Bergen
- In office 22 September 2021 – 27 October 2022
- Mayor: Rune Bakervik
- Preceded by: Rune Bakervik
- Succeeded by: Eira Garrido

Bergen City Commissioner for Schools, Kindergartens and Sports
- In office 25 April 2019 – 27 January 2020
- Chief Commissioner: Roger Valhammer
- Preceded by: Roger Valhammer
- Succeeded by: Endre Tvinnereim

Personal details
- Born: 20 September 1993 (age 33) Bergen, Hordaland, Norway
- Party: Labour
- Education: University of Bergen

Linn Kristin Langley-Rasmussen Engø (born 20 September 1993) is a Norwegian politician for the Labour Party. She has served in several posts in Bergen, notably as the city commissioner for schools, kindergartens and sports between 2019 and 2020, and subsequently deputy mayor and then mayor.

== Background ==
Engø grew up in the area of Flaktveit in the borough of Åsane in Bergen. She attended Bergen Cathedral School between 2009 and 2012. She has a bachelor's degree in history with specialization in Middle Eastern history from the University of Bergen, and a started master's degree in democracy building. Engø has working experience as an assistant nurse, shop assistant and freelance journalist.

== Political career ==
=== Youth league ===
Engø joined the Workers' Youth League at a young age. At only the age of 17, she became acting leader for the Hordaland Workers' Youth League following Tore Eikeland's death at Utøya during the 2011 Norway attacks.

=== Local politics ===
Between 2011 and 2015, Engø was a deputy representative in the Bergen City Council. She was elected as a regular representative in 2015 and was re-elected in 2019.

During Harald Schjelderup's tenure as chief commissioner between 2015 and 2019, Engø served as a political advisor to city commissioner Pål Håfstad Thorsen, who was responsible for education. She then went onto serve as an advisor for Schjelderup.

=== City commissioner ===
On 25 April 2019, when Roger Valhammer took over as chief commissioner from Harald Schjelderup, he appointed Engø as city commissioner for schools, kindergartens and sports.

Engø resigned as city commissioner on 27 January 2020 following a scandal involving security breaches in a school app, Vigilo, which was used as a communications app between school staff and parents to children in both school and kindergartens. There had been a majority in the city council for a confidence vote against her in the leadup to her resignation. Valhammer named Endre Tvinnereim as her successor on 6 February.

=== Deputy mayor ===
With then-mayor Marte Mjøs Persen nominated as a candidate for parliament ahead of the 2021 parliamentary election, the Bergen Labour Party chose Rune Bakervik as their new mayoral candidate along with Engø as the deputy mayor candidate. Both Bakervik and Engø officially assumed office on 22 September after Persen resigned as mayor after being elected to parliament. As deputy mayor, she notably had to step in to consider new chief commissioner candidates in Bakervik's place following Valhammer's resignation. Bakervik handed her the responsibility because he was among the preferred candidates up for consideration.

=== Mayor of Bergen ===
Engø would later give Bakervik the responsibility of forming a new city government. She then ascended to the mayoralty when he resigned on 27 October in preparation to take over as chief commissioner. Bakervik officially took over on 3 November. Eira Garrido from the Socialist Left Party was confirmed as Engø's deputy mayor in December. Engø had sought a term in her own right in the 2023 local elections, but ultimately lost to the Conservatives' Marit Warncke, who succeeded her on 25 October. For some time since the election until Warncke's takeover, Engø was on leave, and Garrido officially oversaw the transference in her place.
