= Jacob Andreas Michelsen =

Norwegian politician

Jacob Andreas Michelsen (17 August 1821 – 12 October 1902) was a Norwegian businessperson and politician, also known as the father of Christian Michelsen.

He was the son of Tollach Michelsen, a manual labourer with roots in the Egersund district. Tollach's wife Madsi Magdalena Eide (died 1829) came from the same social background.

In June 1855 he married Caroline Sophie Ernstine Kjerschow. Their son was the later Norwegian Prime Minister Christian Michelsen. Christian Michelsen was named after Jacob's father-in-law, bishop Peder Christian Hersleb Kjerschow.

Michelsen worked himself up from the modest social background. A businessman, he was awarded burghership in 1847. He was a grain trader, wine grocerer and consul, stock exchange commissioner from 1870 to 1902 and bank director from 1870. He served as mayor of Bergen from 1865 to 1866 and 1876 to 1878. He was elected from his city to the Norwegian Parliament in 1868 and 1871.

He died in 1902, three years before his son became prime minister.

Preceded by Joachim J. M. Ege	Mayor of Bergen; 1865–1866	Succeeded by Ivar Chr. S. Geelmuyden
Preceded by Ivar Chr. S. Geelmuyden	Mayor of Bergen; 1876-1878	Succeeded by Gerhard Chr. Krogh
