= Gunnar Bakke =

Norwegian politician (born 1959)

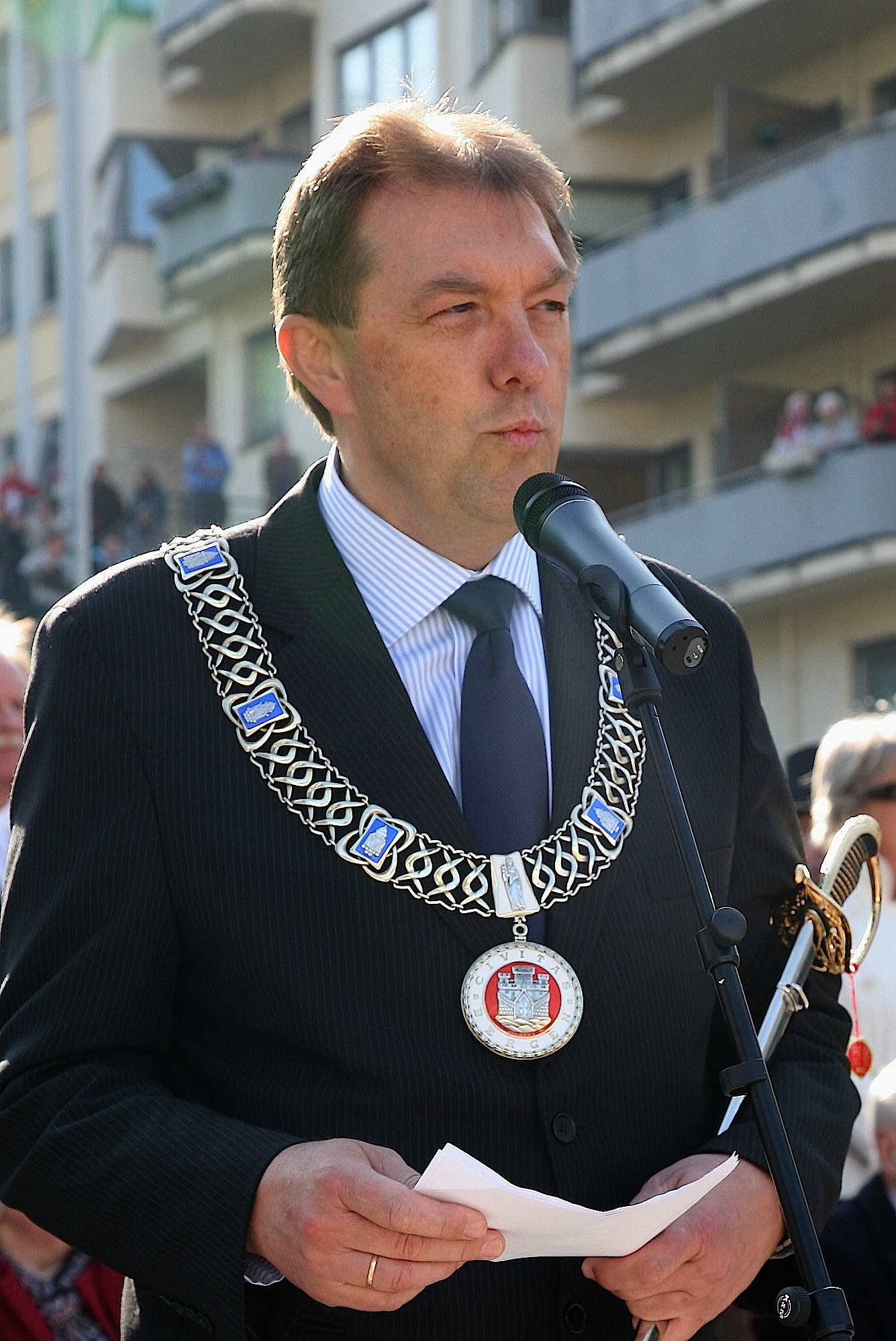

Mayor of Bergen
- In office 29 October 2007 – 31 October 2011
- Deputy: Trude Drevland
- Preceded by: Herman Friele
- Succeeded by: Trude Drevland

Personal details
- Born: 24 October 1959 (age 66) Bergen, Hordaland, Norway
- Party: Progress
- Children: 1
- Profession: Baker

Gunnar Bakke (born 24 October 1959) is a Norwegian politician for the Progress Party who served as the mayor of Bergen Municipality between 2007 and 2011.

== Personal life ==
Bakke was born in the city of Bergen. He was CEO of the bakery chain Baker Brun until mid-2007, and former board leader of Gaia Trafikk, which was the largest public transportation provider in Bergen Municipality and Os Municipality until it merged with HSD in 2006, forming Tide. In 2010 he became Patron of the Scottish-based, global street-paper network International Network of Street Papers, being noticed for his support of the local Bergen-based street-paper Megafon.

He is married, has one child, and is educated as a baker.

== Political career ==
Bakke has been active in local politics since 1989, and has held numerous offices at municipal and county level for the Progress Party, including member of the municipal council of Bergen Municipality from 1995 to 2007, and the Hordaland County Council since 2003. In 2007 he became mayor of Bergen, the first for the Progress Party in the city.

Political offices
Preceded by Herman Friele	Mayor of Bergen; 2007–2011	Succeeded by Trude Drevland
Preceded by Harald Victor Hove (Culture); Øistein Christoffersen (Enterprise)	Bergen City Commissioner of Culture and Enterprise; 2011–2014	Succeeded by Helge Stormoen
