= Anne-Grete Strøm-Erichsen =

Norwegian politician

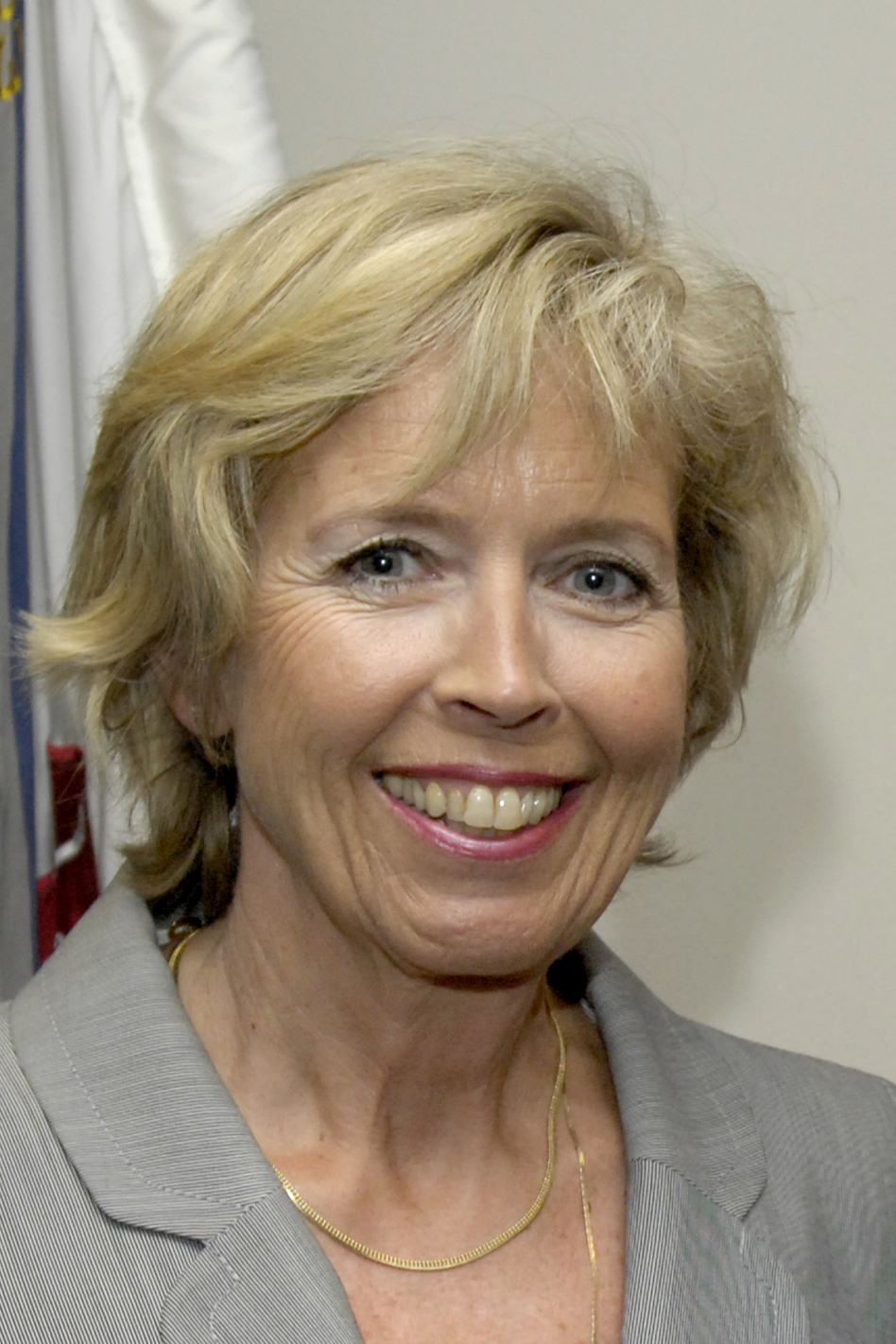

Minister of Defence
- In office 21 September 2012 – 16 October 2013
- Prime Minister: Jens Stoltenberg
- Preceded by: Espen Barth Eide
- Succeeded by: Ine Eriksen Søreide
- In office 17 October 2005 – 20 October 2009
- Prime Minister: Jens Stoltenberg
- Preceded by: Kristin Krohn Devold
- Succeeded by: Grete Faremo

Minister of Health and Care Services
- In office 20 October 2009 – 21 September 2012
- Prime Minister: Jens Stoltenberg
- Preceded by: Bjarne Håkon Hansen
- Succeeded by: Jonas Gahr Støre

Member of the Norwegian Parliament
- In office 1 October 2005 – 30 September 2013
- Deputy: Dag Ole Teigen; Tove Linnea Brandvik
- Constituency: Hordaland

Chief Commissioner of Bergen
- In office 26 June 2000 – 27 October 2003
- Mayor: Ingmar Ljones; Kristian Helland
- Preceded by: Position established
- Succeeded by: Monica Mæland

Mayor of Bergen
- In office 25 October 1999 – 26 June 2000
- Deputy: Ingmar Ljones
- Preceded by: Ingmar Ljones
- Succeeded by: Ingmar Ljones

Deputy Mayor of Bergen
- In office 1998 – 25 October 1999
- Mayor: Ingmar Ljones
- Preceded by: Ole-Jørgen Johannessen
- Succeeded by: Ingmar Ljones

Personal details
- Born: Anne-Grete Hjelle; 21 October 1949 (age 76) Bergen, Hordaland, Norway
- Party: Labour
- Spouse: Arve Strøm-Erichsen (m. 1971)
- Children: 2

Anne-Grete Hjelle Strøm-Erichsen (born 21 October 1949 in Bergen) is a Norwegian politician for the Labour Party. She served as minister of defence from 2005 to 2009 and again from 2012 to 2013. She also served as minister of health and care services from 2009 to 2012. In local politics, she served as the mayor of Bergen from 1999 to 2000 and its first chief commissioner from 2000 to 2003.

== Education and early career ==
Strøm-Erichsen was educated in EDB engineering at Bergen University College in 1974. She then studied at the South Dakota School of Mines & Technology in the United States until 1981 and worked with the EDB systems at the University of Bergen until 1984. She was later senior consultant in Siemens Nixdorf from 1988 to 1991 and BDC AS from 1991 to 1995.

== Political career ==
=== Local politics ===
Strøm-Erichsen was mayor of Bergen from 1999 to 2000 and chaired its city council from 2000 to 2003. Being mayor, she was the president of the Organization of World Heritage Cities from 1999 to 2001. She also chaired the county party chapter from 1997 to 1999, and was a member of the Labour Party central committee from 2002 to 2007.

=== First term as Minister of Defence ===
She was elected to the Storting from Hordaland in the 2005 election. On 17 October 2005, she was appointed minister of defence in the Red-Green Coalition government headed by Jens Stoltenberg. Her seat in parliament was taken by Dag Ole Teigen.

In September 2007, Strøm-Erichsen expressed that Norwegian special forces in Afghanistan could have killed hostile elements, further adding that there was reason to believe that they had, and it was "not something we hide".

In April 2008, Strøm-Erichsen received tenders from the aircraft manufacturers Saab and Lockheed Martin to deliver the new fighter jets to the Norwegian Air Force. The respective manufacturers' aircraft were presented by the U.S Ambassador to Norway Benson K. Whitney and Swedish Defence Minister Sten Tolgfors respectively. Strøm-Erichsen described it as a difficult decision to make, as the two aircraft represent different military operational qualities with different industrial agreements at the bottom.

In February 2009, Strøm-Erichsen stated that Norway had participated strongly with special forces in Afghanistan, notably with 600 soldiers and 750 NOK a year, in response to the US's indication to pressure NATO allies to send more soldiers.

=== Minister of Health and Care Services ===
After the 2009 election, she was appointed minister of health and care services. In 2010 she and Jonas Gahr Støre, minister of foreign affairs, involved in a scandal due to their acceptance of expensive gifts such as carpets from Afghan politicians.

=== Second term as Minister of Defence ===
Following a cabinet reshuffle on 21 September 2012, she was reappointed as minister of defence succeeding Espen Barth Eide, who had been appointed minister of foreign affairs.

In February 2013, she moderated her standing on whether or not Sweden could receive military assistance if they were attacked. She expressed that it was something she could not promise. Prior to that, she had attended a NATO summit with fellow ministers of defence, and later visited Stockholm.

Following the Ministry of Defence's evaluation that Chief of Defence Harald Sunde was not incompetent when he appointed Karl Egil Hanevik as chief of the special forces, Strøm-Erichsen said she would take note of the ministry's legal assessment. The case had been revealed by VG the day before, that Sunde had a personal connection to Hanevik by being his fiancé at his wedding and the two also were sponsors of each other's children.

In June, she presented new responses to the Storting Standing Committee on Scrutiny and Constitutional Affairs regarding critical emails from the Navy Command. She took this action after being criticised for not taking claims of lying, manipulation and threats of surveillance from the Norwegian Army's top level in connection with the proposal to move the Marine Hunter Command from Ramsund and Bergen to Rena.

In the summer of 2013, under her leadership, the Storting decided to introduce gender-neutral conscription in the Norwegian Armed Forces, which was introduced in 2015 under her successor, Ine Eriksen Søreide's leadership.

She did not seek reelection in the 2013 election.

Political offices
Preceded by Ingmar Ljones	Mayor of Bergen; 1999–2000	Succeeded by Ingmar Ljones
Preceded by Position established	Chief Commissioner of Bergen; 2000–2003	Succeeded by Monica Mæland
Preceded by Kristin Krohn Devold	Minister of Defence; 2005–2009	Succeeded by Grete Faremo
Preceded by Bjarne Håkon Hanssen	Minister of Health and Care Services; 2009–2012	Succeeded by Jonas Gahr Støre
Preceded by Espen Barth Eide	Minister of Defence; 2012–2013	Succeeded by Ine Eriksen Søreide
