= Lars Sæbø =

Norwegian trade unionist and politician

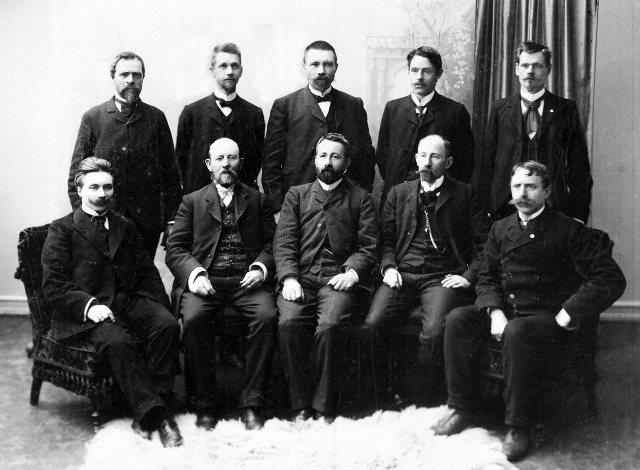
Labour's parliamentary group in 1906, Sæbø on the upper right.

Lars Olsen Sæbø (24 February 1866 – 1941) was a Norwegian trade unionist and politician for the Labour Party.

He was born in Sæbø as a son of farmers Ole Johnsen Sæbø og Magdali Olsen. He took shoemaker's training and had his own shoemaker shop from 1888 to 1906. He was also a member of Bergen city council from 1898, and chaired the trade union Skotøiarbeidernes fagforening.

He was elected to the Parliament of Norway in 1906, 1909 and 1912, representing the constituency of Sandviken. In the 1915 election he also won the first round of voting, with 3,162 votes against 2,443 for Liberal Jørgen Blydt, but in the second round Blydt also got the Conservative and Labour Democrat vote, and won the seat with 3,836 votes against Sæbø's 3,429.
