= Siff Pettersen =

Norwegian singer

Sigfrid Bergljot "Siff" Pettersen (20 June 1934 – 12 December 2000) was a Norwegian operatic soprano.

She was born in Bergen. She attended piano and voice lessons here before taking her formal education in Frankfurt (1957–1960) as well as training under Paul Lohmann in Wiesbaden.

She made her debut at the Wuppertal Opera in 1960. She was employed at the Deutsche Oper am Rhein in Düsseldorf from 1961 to 1976. She later worked in voice pedagogy, both as a docent at the University of Duisburg, at the Bergen Music Conservatory and Norwegian Academy of Music, as well as being a translator from German and English.

She is remembered for roles written by Janáček, Mozart, Smetana, Chaykovsky, Verdi, Wagner and Shostakovich.
