= Christian Torber Hegge Geelmuyden =

Norwegian naval officer and politician

- Born: October 16, 1816; Trondheim
- Died: May 13, 1885 (aged 68)
- Spouse: 2
- Relatives: Hans Geelmuyden
- Military career
- Allegiance: Norwegian
- Branch: Royal Norwegian Navy
- Rank: Commander
- Awards: Knight of the Royal Norwegian Order of St. Olav
- Other work: Politician

Christian Torber Hegge Geelmuyden (16 October 1816 – 13 May 1885) was a Norwegian naval officer and politician.

He was born in Trondheim as the son of Hans Geelmuyden, and brother of Ivar Geelmuyden. He married twice and was the father of Marie Geelmuyden, first Norwegian woman to receive a degree in science.

Christian Geelmuyden made a career in the Royal Norwegian Navy. He joined the navy as a cadet at the age of fourteen, being promoted to second lieutenant in 1836, premier lieutenant in 1848 and captain lieutenant in 1857. He then became captain in 1864 and commander in 1874. He was stationed in Horten, where he was mayor from 1857 to 1864. He was elected to the Norwegian Parliament in 1857, representing the constituency of Jarlsberg og Laurvigs Amt. He later served as a deputy representative during the term 1862–1864.

He was a Knight of the Royal Norwegian Order of St. Olav, and was a member of both the Royal Norwegian Society of Sciences and Letters and the Norwegian Academy of Science and Letters. A street in Horten, Geelmuydens gate, was named after him.
