= Chief Commissioner of Bergen =

Head of the city government in Bergen, Norway

- Byrådslederen i Bergen
- Incumbent; Chris Jørgen Rødland since 25 September 2026
- Formation: 26 June 2000
- First holder: Anne-Grete Strøm-Erichsen
- Website: The City Government

The Chief Commissioner of Bergen, alternatively known as the Governing Mayor of Bergen (Norwegian: Byrådsleder) is the head of the city government in Bergen, the second largest city in Norway. The position was created on 26 June 2000 when Bergen adopted the parliamentary system. All members of the City Government is elected by the Bergen City Council.

== Formation ==
Prior to adopting the parliamentary system, Bergen was governed by the principle of an executive committee, elected from members of the City Council, and a permanent appointed chief officer. According to Norwegian law the matter of adopting a parliamentary system has to be voted over twice, in two subsequent terms. The first vote was held 26 October 1998, and 44 of the 67 city council members supported the proposition. The second vote was held on 25 October 1999, and with the support from 42 members of the city council, the decision was made to introduce the parliamentary system on 26 June the following year. Bergen was the second municipality in Norway, after Oslo, to adopt a parliamentary system.

One of the main arguments for introducing the parliamentary system was to increase the local politicians control of the governing of the city, on the expense of the permanent appointed chief officer and the bureaucracy. The parliamentary system in Bergen has been criticized for polarizing the political debate and, especially when the city government holds the majority of the City Council, reducing the authority of the City Council.

The City Council limits the number of cabinet members to 7, including the Chief Commissioner.

== History ==
=== 2000–2003 ===
Anne-Grete Strøm-Erichsen from the Labour Party became the first Chief Commissioner when the position was created in 2000. For the first year her cabinet consisted of the Labour Party, the Liberal Party, the Christian People's Party and the Centre Party. On 25 June 2001 the Liberal Party left the council. Strøm-Erichsen held office until her party's defeat in the 2003 local election.

=== 2003–2015 ===
Monica Mæland served as the Chief Commissioner from 2003 to 2013, representing the Conservative Party. Her first cabinet was elected by the City Council on 27 October 2003, consisting of the Conservative Party, Christians People's Party and Liberal Party. After the local election in 2007 the Liberal Party left this council as well, and was replaced by the Progress Party. The Progress Party left the cabinet on 28 April 2009, due to a disagreement about continuing the lifespan of the toll ring financing the Bergen Program for Transport, Urban Development and the Environment. However the party reentered the cabinet a year later. The same three parties make up the third council of Monica Mæland, which was elected after the 2011 local election. Mæland was replaced by Ragnhild Stolt-Nielsen after she was appointed to the new government in 2013. Stolt-Nielsen was succeeded by Martin Smith-Sivertsen after having lost her party's nomination for the 2015 local elections. Smith-Sivertsen went on to lose the 2015 election to Harald Schjelderup.

=== 2015–2023 ===
Schjelderup served as Chief Commissioner until April 2019, when he announced his resignation and was later succeeded by Roger Valhammer on 25 April. Valhammer led Bergen through the COVID-19 pandemic, and initially resigned in 2021 after putting forward the cabinet question (kabinettspørsmål) on 24 November over disputes of extending the Bergen Light Rail to Åsane. However, on 2 December, two council members from the Centre Party and one from the Red Party secured a majority for extending the light rail over Bryggen. This ensured that Valhammar could continue to govern and he announced his new cabinet on 6 December. In October 2022, Valhammer again announced his intent to resign following revelations of child service cases where children had not been given sufficient or lacking follow-ups. He was succeeded by mayor Rune Bakervik as Chief Commissioner on 3 November. Bakervik led the Labour Party into the 2023 local elections, where neither the Labour or Conservative blocks won a majority, but the latter one was the largest. The Conservatives formed a government with the Progress Party and Centre Party, with support from the Bergen List, Industry and Business Party and the Pensioners' Party, with Christine B. Meyer as chief commissioner.

== Chief Commissioners ==
Key
Conservative Party
Labour Party

Portrait	Name	Party	Took office	Left office	Tenure	Election(s)
	Anne-Grete Strøm-Erichsen	Labour	26 June 2000	27 October 2003	3 years, 123 days	–
	Monica Mæland	Conservative	27 October 2003	16 October 2013	9 years, 354 days	2003; 2007; 2011
	Ragnhild Stolt-Nielsen	Conservative	17 October 2013	20 October 2014	1 year, 3 days	–
	Martin Smith-Sivertsen	Conservative	20 October 2014	22 October 2015	1 year, 2 days	–
	Harald Schjelderup	Labour	22 October 2015	25 April 2019	3 years, 185 days	2015
	Roger Valhammer	Labour	25 April 2019	3 November 2022	3 years, 192 days	2019
	Rune Bakervik	Labour	3 November 2022	30 October 2023	361 days	–
	Christine B. Meyer	Conservative	30 October 2023	25 September 2026	2 years, 330 days	2023
	Chris Jørgen Rødland	Conservative	25 September 2026	present	47 days	–
