= Ivar Geelmuyden =

Norwegian politician

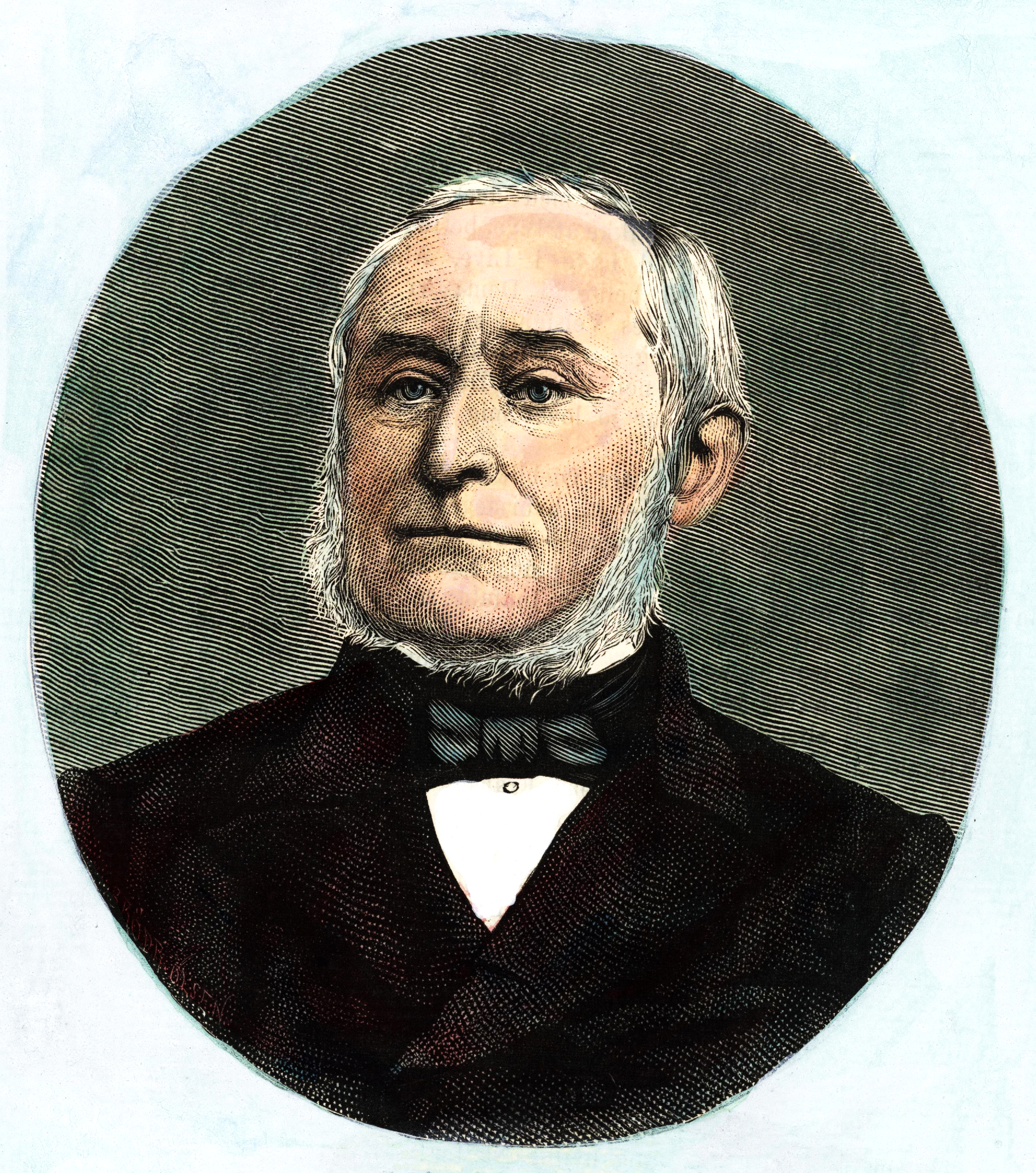
Ivar Christian Sommerschild Geelmuyden

Ivar Christian Sommerschild Geelmuyden (8 April 1819 – 21 May 1875) was a Norwegian politician.

He was the son of Hans Geelmuyden, and brother of Christian Torber Hegge Geelmuyden. He was the uncle of Marie Geelmuyden, first Norwegian woman to receive a degree in science.

He enrolled as a student in 1837 and graduated as cand.mag. in 1837. He worked as a teacher in Christiania before moving to Fredrikshald in 1852. While living here he was elected to the Norwegian Parliament in 1857, representing the constituency of Fredrikshald.

In 1862 he was hired as a school principal in Bergen. He was elected from his city to the Norwegian Parliament in 1865, 1868, 1871 and 1874. He served as mayor of Bergen from 1867 to 1868 and 1873 to 1875.

He died in 1875.

Preceded by Jacob A. Michelsen	Mayor of Bergen; 1867–1868	Succeeded by Morten Beyer
Preceded by Morten Beyer	Mayor of Bergen; 1873–1875	Succeeded by Jacob A. Michelsen
