= Arne Næss (politician) =

Norwegian politician

Arne Næss (21 February 1925 – 13 December 2009) was a Norwegian politician from the Christian Democratic Party.

== Biography ==
He was born in Bergen, Norway. He was elected to Bergen city council in 1964, became deputy mayor in 1976 and mayor in 1984. He was Bergen's first Christian Democratic mayor. He served as mayor from 1984 to 1985 and 1988 to 1989.

Næss was a board member of the Bergen International Festival, the Bergenshalvøens Kommunale Kraftselskap, the Norwegian Water Resources and Energy Directorate, and the company that regulates the Askøy Bridge. In Motorførernes Avholdsforbund he was a board member from 1956 to 1968 and chaired the central committee from 1976 to 1980. In 1983 he was decorated with the Order of the Dannebrog.

Denominationally, he was a member of the Evangelical Lutheran Free Church of Norway. He was married and had three children, though he was predeceased by his wife in 1992. Næss died in December 2009.

Political offices
Preceded by Eilert Eilertsen	Mayor of Bergen; 1984–1985	Succeeded by Henrik J. Lisæth
Preceded by Henrik J. Lisæth	Mayor of Bergen; 1988–1989	Succeeded by Bengt Martin Olsen
