= Bård Ose =

Norwegian music journalist and author

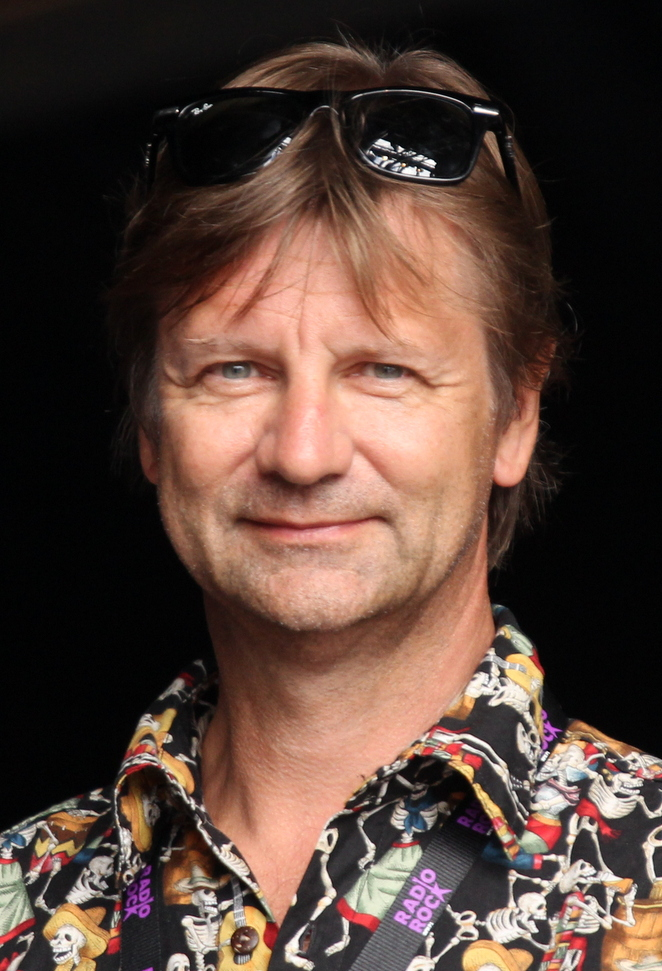
- Born: 24 June 1960 (age 66)
- Title: Journalist, writer

Bård Ose (born 24 June 1960 in Kristiansand, raised in Bergen) is a Norwegian music journalist and author.

Ose has written books about Vinskvetten, The Beatles, The Rolling Stones and pop and rock music from Bergen, as well as being a co-author of Norsk pop & rock-leksikon.

He is one of the presenters for the radio programs P.I.L.S and Radio Rock on NRK P1, as well as presenter for Ren 60 and Gammelnorsk on NRK P1+. He has also been presenter of the TV program Førkveld on NRK1 and NRK's district broadcasts in Hordaland, and a contributor to the radio program Stjernepose on NRK P13.

In 2007, Ose and Finn Tokvam made a series in the radio program Norgesglasset, called Our Daily Beatles, in which they played all Beatles songs in chronological order.

Before Ose became an NRK employee, he was a culture journalist in Bergensavisen.

== Bibliography ==
- 1993: 30 år med Rolling Stones, Eide Forlag, ISBN 9788251404266
- 1995: Rockens giganter, TA A/S, ISBN 8299372402
- 1996: Helselaust – Historien om Vinskvetten (together with Arne Ristesund), Eide Forlsag, ISBN 9788251405126
- 1999: Beatles hele livet, Eide Forlag/Vigmostad & Bjørke, ISBN 9788241904912
- 2005: Norsk pop & rock leksikon (together with Siren Steen, Jan Eggum and Jon Vidar Bergan), Vega publishing house, ISBN 9788282113496
- 2009: Rock og sprell mellom syv fjell (together with Jo Gjerstad, Svein Hovland, Eilif Stene and Vemund Grimstad), Bodoni publishing house, ISBN 9788271285463
- 2010: 100 beste rockeplater fra Bergen, Bodoni forlag, ISBN 9788271285890
- 2011: Popminner (together with Jan Eggum), Vega publishing house, ISBN 9788282113168
