= Roger Valhammer =

Norwegian politician

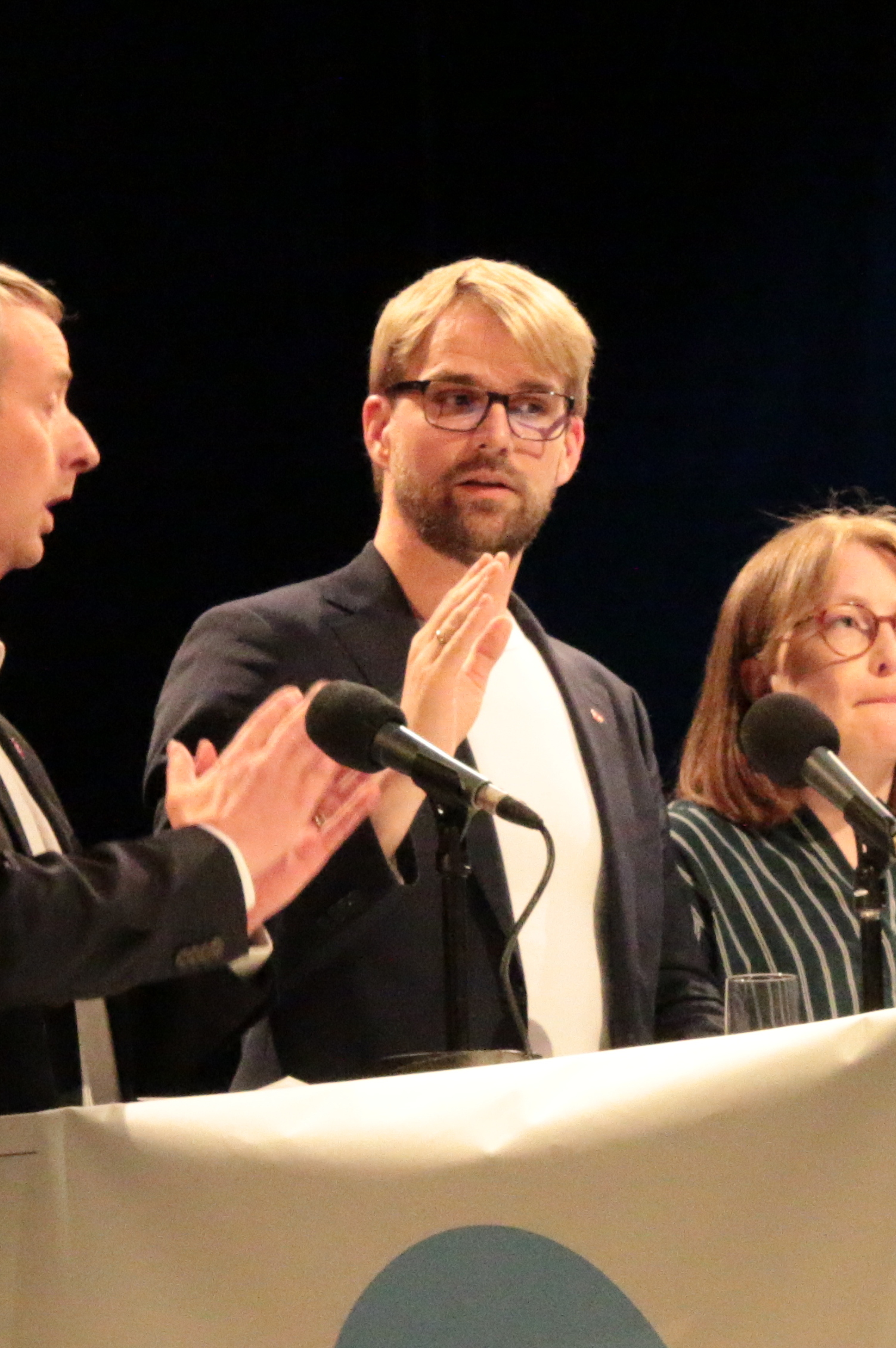
- Valhammer during an election debate in 2019

Chief Commissioner of Bergen
- In office 25 April 2019 – 3 November 2022
- Deputy: Håkon Pettersen; Thor Haakon Bakke
- Mayor: Marte Mjøs Persen; Rune Bakervik; Linn Engø
- Preceded by: Harald Schjelderup
- Succeeded by: Rune Bakervik

Bergen City Commissioner for Schools, Kindergartens and Sports
- In office 16 August 2018 – 25 April 2019
- Chief Commissioner: Harald Schjelderup
- Preceded by: Pål Hafstad Thorsen
- Succeeded by: Linn Engø
- Acting; 1 December 2015 – 4 February 2016
- Chief Commissioner: Harald Schjelderup
- Preceded by: Pål Hafstad Thorsen
- Succeeded by: Pål Hafstad Thorsen

Personal details
- Born: 15 March 1984 (age 42) Tysvær Municipality, Rogaland, Norway
- Party: Labour
- Children: 1
- Education: University of Bergen

Roger Valhammer (born 15 March 1984) is a Norwegian politician from the Labour Party. He served as chief commissioner of Bergen from 2019 to 2022, and previously served as city commissioner for schools, kindergartens and sports between 2018 and 2019.

== Background ==
=== Personal life ===
Valhammer grew up in Tysvær Municipality in Rogaland. His father was a painter and his mother worked in a shop. He moved to Bergen to study, and later settled there permanently. In Bergen, he became active in the Workers' Youth League, where he took on a number of different positions. He currently lives in the borough of Nordnes with a daughter and partner.

=== Education ===
Valhammer has a master's degree in comparative politics from the University of Bergen. He was involved in various student organisations there. He has professional experience from, among other things, the employee organisation Union of Employees in Commerce and Offices and as a strategic advisor at Sparebanken Vest.

== Political career ==
=== City council ===
Valhammer was elected to the Bergen City Council in 2011 and was re-elected in 2015 and 2019. Between 2017 and 2019, he led the Bergen Labour Party.

=== Parliament ===
Valhammer was elected as a deputy representative from Hordaland following the 2013 parliamentary election. He served the full term until 2017.

=== City commissioner ===
Valhammer was appointed acting city commissioner for schools, kindergartens and sports on 1 December 2015 and served until 4 February 2016 during Pål Hafstad Thorsen's parental leave.

Valhammer was appointed to the position on a permanent basis on 16 August 2018.

=== Chief commissioner of Bergen ===
Valhammer was appointed chief commissioner of Bergen on 25 April 2019 following Harald Schjelderup's resignation. His government was a continued coalition between the Labour Party, Liberal Party and the Christian Democratic Party, with the latter's Håkon Pettersen as deputy. Following the 2019 local elections, the coalition was expanded with the Green Party, with Thor Haakon Bakke as deputy.

As chief commissioner, Valhammer led Bergen through the COVID-19 pandemic. When the pandemic initially hit the municipality in March 2020, Valhammer and health officials announced strict measures to protect vulnerable groups and secure smooth operations of the health service. Even stricter measures were implemented in September with increasing numbers of infected; which notably included the need to wear masks on public transport, limiting the number of people at private and public events and registration of visitors in restaurants. By December, Bergen lifted many of its local measures, with the national measures and guidelines being recommended for further usage.

He initially announced his resignation in 2021 after putting forward the cabinet question (kabinettspørsmål) on 24 November over disputes of extending the Bergen Light Rail to Åsane. However, on 2 December, two council members from the Centre Party and one from the Red Party secured a majority for extending the light rail over Bryggen. This ensured that Valhammar could continue to govern and he announced his new cabinet on 6 December.

The Christian Democratic Party withdrew from the government on 22 August 2022 over disagreements on urban development policies. Throughout the remainder of his term, Valhammer led a coalition consisting of the Labour Party, Liberal and Green parties.

Valhammer again announced his intent to resign in October following revelations of child service cases where children had not been given sufficient or was lacking follow-ups. He was succeeded by mayor Rune Bakervik as chief commissioner on 3 November.

== Civic career ==
In February 2023, Valhammer became director of community contact at TV2.
