= Johan Gerhard Theodor Ameln =

Norwegian merchant and politician

Johan Gerhard Theodor Ameln (12 March 1838 – 19 June 1917) was a Norwegian merchant and politician.

Ameln was born at Bergen in Hordaland, Norway. He was the son of Christian Gerhard Ameln (1809-1872) and Laura Therese Pauline (Wennberg) Ameln (1817-1888). He was from a merchant family and was an uncle of Henrik Ameln and Haakon Ameln. He worked as a merchant and shipowner. He was the mayor of Bergen and was the chairman of the Bergen Chamber of Commerce.

He was elected to the Norwegian Parliament in 1889 representing the constituency of Bergen.
