= Søren Laland =

Norwegian biochemist (1922–1998)

Søren Gustav Laland
- Born: May 23, 1922; Bergen, Norway
- Died: July 3, 1998 (aged 76)
- Education: University of Oslo, University of Birmingham
- Known for: Professor of biochemistry at the University of Oslo
- Scientific career
- Fields: Biochemistry
- Workplaces: University of Oslo
- Thesis: Studies in Deoxy Hexoses and Deoxypentosenucleic Acids (1951)

Søren Gustav Laland (23 May 1922 – 3 July 1998) was a Norwegian biochemist.

He was born in Bergen. He finished his secondary education in 1941, took the mag.scient. degree in chemistry at the University of Oslo in 1947 and his PhD at the University of Birmingham in 1951. His thesis was called Studies in Deoxy Hexoses and Deoxypentosenucleic Acids.

From 1955 to his retirement he served as a professor of biochemistry at the University of Oslo. He was a fellow of the Norwegian Academy of Science and Letters since 1964. He was an honorary member of the Norwegian Biochemical Society.

He resided in Bærum, and died in July 1998.
