= Marte Mjøs Persen =

Norwegian politician (born 1975)

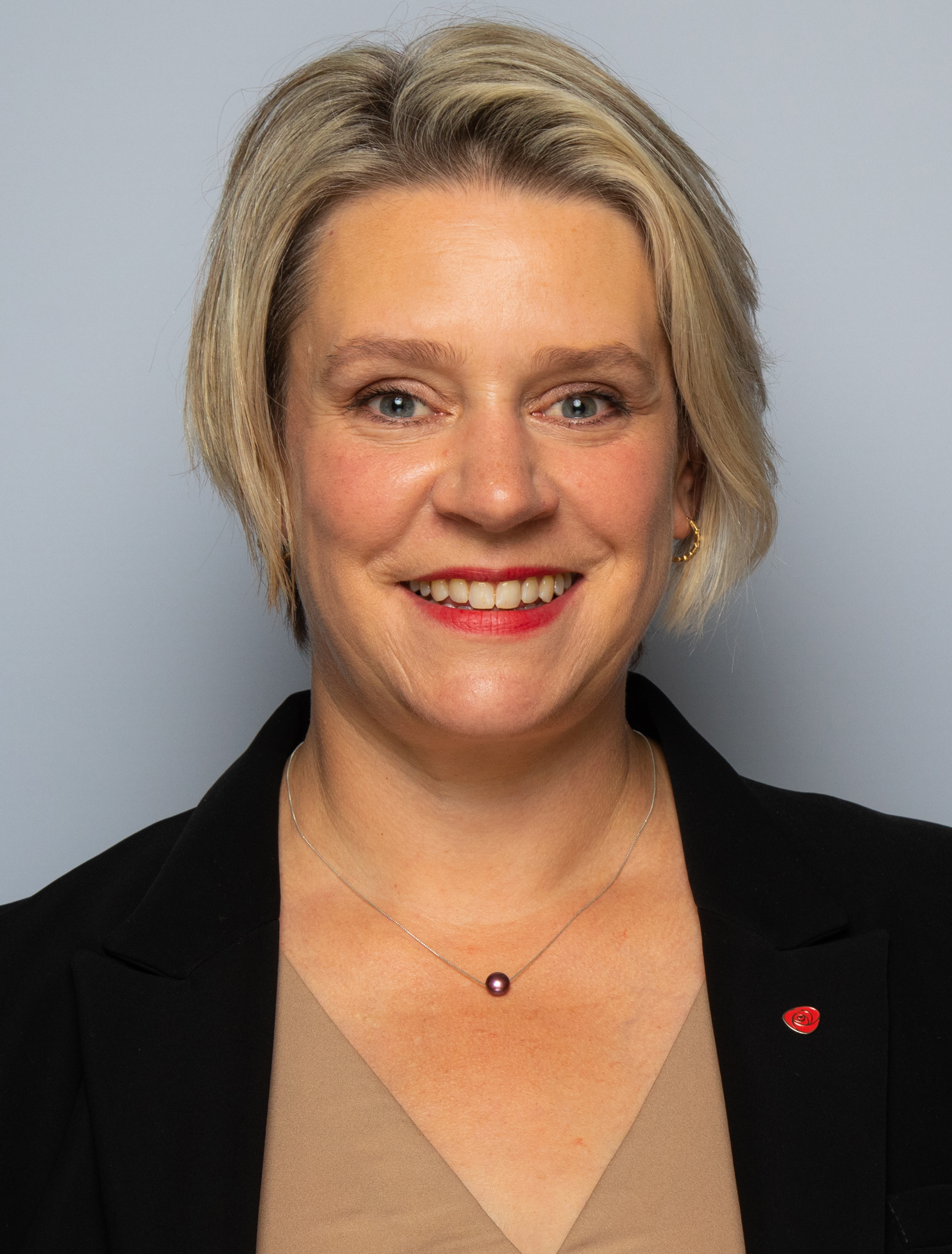
- Official portrait, 2021

Minister of Labour and Social Inclusion
- In office 7 March 2022 – 16 October 2023
- Prime Minister: Jonas Gahr Støre
- Preceded by: Hadia Tajik
- Succeeded by: Tonje Brenna

Minister of Petroleum and Energy
- In office 14 October 2021 – 7 March 2022
- Prime Minister: Jonas Gahr Støre
- Preceded by: Tina Bru
- Succeeded by: Terje Aasland

Member of the Storting
- In office 1 October 2021 – 30 September 2025
- Deputy: Lubna Jaffery; Benjamin Jakobsen
- Constituency: Hordaland

Mayor of Bergen
- In office 28 October 2015 – 22 September 2021
- Deputy: Marita Moltu; Rune Bakervik
- Chief Commissioner: Harald Schjelderup; Roger Valhammer
- Preceded by: Trude Drevland
- Succeeded by: Rune Bakervik

Personal details
- Born: 24 April 1975 (age 51) Bergen, Hordaland, Norway
- Party: Labour
- Other political affiliations: Red Electoral Alliance (until 2007); Red Party (2007–2008)
- Domestic partner: Nils-Olav Nøss
- Children: 4
- Education: University of Bergen
- Occupation: Politician

Marte Mjøs Persen (born 24 April 1975) is a Norwegian politician from the Labour Party. She served as minister of labour and social inclusion from 2022 to 2023, and minister of petroleum and energy from 2021 to 2022. She served as the mayor of Bergen from 2015 until being elected to the Storting in 2021.

== Political career ==
=== Local politics ===
Persen is a former member of the Red Electoral Alliance, and served as deputy chairman from 2003 to 2007, when the alliance merged to form the Red Party. She left the Red Party in 2008 after internal disagreements. She has been elected member of the city council in Bergen since 2003, first representing the Red Electoral Alliance, and from 2008 the Labour Party. During this period, for seven years, she served as secretary of the Norwegian Humanist Association until the Bergen mayoral election. In 2015 she was elected mayor in Bergen, and reelected in 2019.

In 2018, she was elected leader of the Hordaland Labour Party. She was re-elected in 2023 as leader of the now rebranded Vestland Labour Party, with Helge Robert Midtbø and Torgeir Toppe as deputy leaders. She announced in January 2025 that she wouldn't seek re-election at the next county party convention.

=== Parliament ===
She was elected representative to the Storting from the constituency of Hordaland for the period 2021–2025, for the Labour Party. While being part of the Støre Cabinet from 2021, Lubna Jaffery met in the Storting in her place, and in 2023 Benjamin Jakobsen met. Upon returning to parliament, she became a member of the Standing Committee on Transport and Communications and the Election Committee.

At her local chapter's nomination convention in November 2024, ahead of the 2025 election, Persen announced that she wouldn't seek re-election and endorsed Jaffery for the top position, which was later approved.

In 2020 she was one of the signatories of the "Call for Inclusive Feminism," a document which led to the establishment of the Initiative for Inclusive Feminism.

=== Minister of Petroleum and Energy ===
On 14 October 2021, Mjøs Persen was appointed minister of petroleum and energy in Støre's Cabinet.

==== 2021 ====
As the new minister of energy Persen faced a delicate problem. The wind farms of Storheia (80 mills) and Roan (71 mills) are situated within Fosen Reindeer District (Norwegian: Fosen reinbeitedistrikt), and they are built in spite of loud protests from the Sami People. A recent ruling in the Supreme Court ruled that the windmills were set up in violation of the rights of the indigenous people, thus illegally, and the license granted by the ministry in 2013 was illegal.

Regarding the electricity price crisis, Persen promised measures to give people a lower price. She stated that the government would take a look at both short- and long-term solutions.

In the Storting question time on 27 October, Persen acknowledged that electrification of the Norwegian shelf would require an increased use of power on land in the short term up until 2030.

Person met the lawyers representing the Sami people in the issue of the wind farms within the Fosen area, on 2 November. She didn't offer a solution to the matter as the issue stood, but emphasised that she prioritised the state's duty for the people and for the Sami population. She also said she would be meeting the Sami people affected face to face, as soon as possible.

In December, she and fellow ministers Anniken Huitfeldt and Jan Christian Vestre, and Crown Prince Haakon visited the United States to promote Norwegian interests notably regarding "War, the Arctic, offshore wind, contemporary art and Christmas trees". Persen notably cited that they were going to visit Equinor's recently opened Brooklyn office in relation to the ongoing offshore wind projects outside of New York. Persen decided to travel home after only a day out of the four scheduled days to spend in the U. S, citing to compensate for a state secretary with a child who had to be home due to a COVID-19 closed kindergarten. Her chief of communication, Arvid Samland, denied that her return home was due to Progress Party leader Sylvi Listhaug's criticism of Persen's visit.

==== 2022 ====
In a written response to the Progress Party's Marius Arion Nilsen on 4 January 2022, Persen revealed that the electricity prices would be around 13,000 NOK in Southern Norway for the first quarter. The usual cost is around 7,000 NOK. In her response, she said: "I would like to emphasize that these estimates are average calculations made by NVE based on various assumptions. Actual electricity bill will vary from household to household".

Persen received criticism by the media and the Socialist Left Party for not participating at Storting sessions when asked to do so. She responded by saying that it was the Prime Minister's Office who was responsible to call a minister in to attend sessions, and insisted that she had participated whenever asked to. Stavanger Aftenblad encouraged Støre to reconsider her position.

During a minor reshuffle on 7 March 2022, she was appointed Minister of Labour and Social Inclusion.

=== Minister of Labour and Social Inclusion ===
Following Hadia Tajik's resignation after controversy regarding the use of a government apartment and fringe benefit; Persen was appointed her successor on 7 March 2022.

==== 2022 ====
Shortly after assuming office, Persen announced that the government would make an amendment to the Working Environment Act, defining sexual harassment more clearly and making it illegal. She expressed hope for the amendment to make it easier for vulnerable people to report harassment, and add contribution to sanctions where sexual harassment is occurring. The amendment was sent out on a hearing in the Storting on 8 March.

At a press conference on 29 April, the government announced that temporary changes to laws in order to include Ukrainian refugees. Mjøs Persen stated: "We must ensure that Ukrainian refugees have a safe and predictable everyday life as possible. At the same time, we know that the situation can be demanding for the municipalities, which already have many statutory tasks. Therefore, it is important that our bills address both of these considerations. The government is also proposing a temporary legal basis that allows for this. Among other things, it may be relevant to expand the target group for training in reception if the waiting time before settlement becomes long. All changes must be temporary and repealed no later than 1 July 2023. If there is a need to continue certain proposals, this will be considered and consulted again".

With the AAP scheme having been temporarily abolished since 1 February, Mjøs Persen suggested on 11 May that the scheme should be permanently abolished. The background being that the scheme would not take effect before a waiting period of a year had a person not yet been cleared. This has been in effect since 2018. Mjøs Persen stated: "We want to end the anti-social waiting year. No one gets healed from being thrown out of a scheme".

On 17 June, Mjøs Persen announced that the government would be focusing on giving full time workers a priority in working life with new legislation that full time should be the "main rule". She stated: "It is important to make the best possible use of the opportunities in the workforce, especially now that so many Norwegian companies are reporting a shortage of qualified labour. If many of those who work part-time can work more, it will make a significant contribution".

After aircraft engineers went on strike on 18 June, the negotiating parts were unable to reach an agreed settlement. On 28 June, Mjøs Persen announced that the strike had ended after she had called for a compulsory wage arbitration. Following the announcement, she stated: "I am not happy that the responsibility for the consequences of the conflict has been shifted to the government in this way". As the strike also effected ambulance aircraft, causing mass delays in hospital appointments, she commented: "Strikes and lockouts have major consequences for many. Many of the consequences that we see are unfortunately something we have to live with when the social partners use legal means, but it is also the parties' responsibility and choice to reach an agreement and avoid the strike having consequences for third parties more than what is affordable to have, and consequences for life and health are something that should definitely be avoided. You as a party have the opportunity to avoid it, both by taking strikes and using dispositions, but unfortunately the parties did not".

Mjøs Persen again put forward a compulsory wage arbitration in order to prevent a strike in the petroleum industry, where an increasing number of oil workers had signalled a strike, effective from 9 July. Persen presented the compulsory wage arbitration on 5 July, effectively ending the strike before it even began. She reasoned that it was "unreasonable to go on strike due to the current situation in Europe" and called it "indefensible to shut down the gas production".

Aftenposten revealed in June that the Norwegian Labour Inspection Authority allowed a cabin company to not get fined for 800,000kr over dangerous working conditions in the work place. At the time, Persen expressed shock over the revelations. Three months later, she was open to a change in the law, however she didn't want to take said action immediately, and rather allow for new measures to be in effect for some time before reconsidering the labour law. The Red Party criticised the government for lack of action in the case. During July, Red Party MP Mímir Kristjánsson sent several questions to Persen as a follow-up to the aforementioned Aftenposten revelations, but Persen ignored the last question entirely. When she received the questions, she asked the Norwegian Labour Inspection Authority for inputs, while her ministry gave NRK a redacted version of the Authority's letter to Persen. She would later clarify that it wasn't natural for her to summarise all the companies that either might have or did break the law and that there was no need for company names in order to formulate policies. On 24 September, Persen made a list of companies who have broken the labour law public, which also listed the ones that the Norwegian Labour Inspection Authority have fined since 2017. She did however note that one shouldn't consider all of those companies "criminals".

On 27 September, Persen announced a compulsory wage arbitration against a teacher's strike, which had escalated over the last month, affecting primary, lower secondary and upper secondary schools in Western Norway, Eastern Norway (with the exception of Oslo) and Trøndelag. The strike had been caused due to protests against low salaries for teachers.

On 27 October, she attended an informal meeting with her Nordic counterparts to discuss integration in the Nordics.

On 17 November, Persen and Labour MP Tuva Moflag admitted that the party should have sent someone to Debatten to discuss the increasing prices two days prior. The party's rejection to participate had originally been due to the ongoing budget negotiations. Persen added that it had been a collective decision to not participate, but that it overall had been her own responsibility to not participate.

On 7 December, she informed the Standing Committee on Scrutiny and Constitutional Affairs that she would not be declassifying the NAV report from the previous government, despite their being a majority in parliament in favour of the report becoming declassified. She argued that it was due to the report being involved in an ongoing court case and that it was an internal document. The Socialist Left and Red parties criticised the move, with the latter vowing to follow-up the case further.

==== 2023 ====
In March 2023, she announced a forced wage board against to put an end to the aid ambulance strike, which had put NHO Luftfart and Parat against each other. The latter of which argued that a forced wage board would not help solve the issue, while Mjøs Persen called it "unfortunate" that the two parties had not been able to reach an agreement.

In June, Mjøs Persen confirmed in parliament in response to a question from the Red Party that the government would not change the rules for the allocation of care money to be given to people without previous employment income.

As part of the state budget for 2024, Mjøs Persen announced that the government would spend 20 million NOK to strengthen efforts to combat work crime, social dumping and frivolity in working life.

On 16 October, Persen was succeeded by Tonje Brenna in a cabinet reshuffle.

== Civic career ==
In January 2026, it was announced that she would be joining Rud Pedersen Public Affairs as an associate director.

== Personal life ==
Persen was born in Bergen on 24 April 1975, a daughter of Svein Persen and Eli Hedvig Mjøs, and graduated with a bachelor's degree in Culture and Social Studies from the University of Bergen. She lives with her partner, Nils-Olav Nøss and has four children, notably triplets and one adult son.

Political offices
Preceded by Hadia Tajik	Minister of Labour and Social Inclusion; 2022–2023	Succeeded by Tonje Brenna
Preceded by Tina Bru	Minister of Petroleum and Energy; 2021–2022	Succeeded by Terje Aasland
Preceded by Trude Drevland	Mayor of Bergen; 2015–2021	Succeeded by Rune Bakervik
Party political offices
Preceded by N/A	Leader of the Vestland Labour Party; 2018–present	Incumbent
