= Kristian Helland =

Norwegian politician

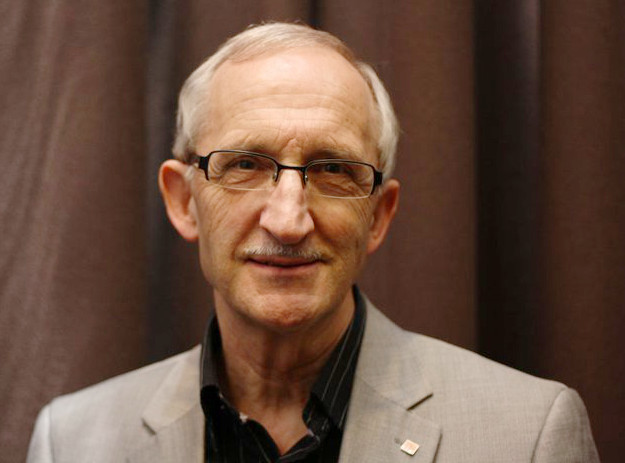
Kristian Helland

Kristian Helland (born 26 July 1947) is a Norwegian politician for the Christian Democratic Party.

He is known as mayor of Bergen, the second largest city in Norway, from 2001 to 2003. He replaced Ingmar Ljones who was elected to the Parliament of Norway in 2001. Following his successor's election in 2003, Helland continued as deputy mayor during the term 2003–2007. In 2007 he stepped down from Bergen politics, but continued as leader of the Hordaland party chapter.

Outside politics he has worked within the missionary community, and with Christian education. He has been rector of Rauma Folk High School.

Political offices
Preceded by Ingmar Ljones	Mayor of Bergen; 2001–2003	Succeeded by Herman Friele
