= Haakon Ameln =

Norwegian businessman

Haakon Ameln (16 November 1881 – 2 June 1949) was a Norwegian businessperson.

He was born in Bergen as a son of consul Lauritz Paul Theodor Ameln (1847–1925) and Olivia Dorothea Wilander (1849–1912), and a brother of Henrik Ameln. In 1929 he married In 1907 he married Aagot Døscher.

He finished his secondary education in 1898 and graduated from the Royal Frederick University with the cand.jur. degree in 1904. He then studied abroad for one year. He was the chief executive of the insurance company Norske Alliance from 1922, retiring on 31 December 1938.

He chaired Bergens Kreditbank and Den Nationale Scene, and was a board member of Tyssefaldene, Bergen Chamber of Commerce and Norges Hypotekforening for Næringslivet. He was a vice consul for Sweden from 1914, and was promoted to consul in 1919. He was decorated as a Knight of the Order of the Polar Star and a Knight, First Class of the Order of Vasa.

He was also a bibliophile with over 10,000 items in his collection. He died in 1949 and was buried in Møllendal.
