= Henrik Ameln =

Norwegian jurist and politician

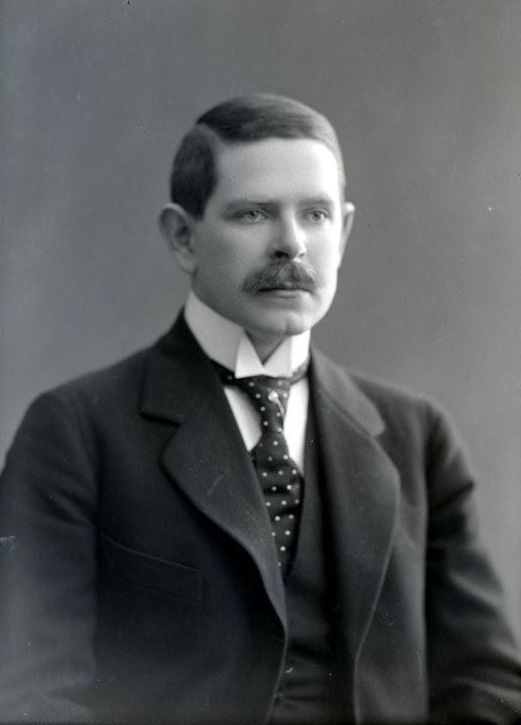
Henrik Ameln

Henrik Ameln (29 April 1879 – 17 September 1961) was a Norwegian jurist and politician for the Conservative Party. He was a mayor of Bergen, and served five terms in the Parliament of Norway.

== Personal life ==
He was born in Bergen and grew up on Fjøsanger. He was the son of Theodor Poul Lauritz Ameln (1847–1925) and his wife Olivia Dorothea Hildegund Wilander (1849–1912). He was the nephew of Johan Gerhard Theodor Ameln, and a brother of Haakon Ameln. In 1906, he married Aagot Christensen (1881–1968).

== Career ==
He finished his secondary education in 1897, and in 1902 he had taken the cand.jur. degree. He then worked as a jurist. He also edited the publications Norsk Forsikringstidende and Bjørgvin. In 1911 he took extra education to work as an average adjuster like his father. From 1920 to 1923 he worked as director of the bank Den Norske Handelsbank.

Ameln chaired the local Conservative Party chapter for several non-consecutive periods, and was a member of the national central committee from 1916 to 1919. He was elected to Bergen city council in 1910, and was re-elected several times until 1925; from 1920 to 1922 he served as mayor. He was the first mayor from his party in Bergen since Christian Michelsen in 1893.

Ameln had also been elected to the Parliament of Norway in 1913, and initially served only one term. After his period as mayor he was re-elected in 1922, 1925, 1928 and 1931 to serve four more terms in Parliament. From 1926 to 1927 he was the President of the Odelsting. He also served in Bergen city council for a second term, from 1934 to 1945.

Ameln held a very large number of memberships in various boards and committees, both public and private. He was a board member of the Comité Maritime International, the International Law Association in Norway, Bergenshalvøens Kommunale Kraftselskap, Bergens Handelsbank, the Union of Norwegian Cities from 1921 to 1923 and of Norwegian State Railways from 1933 to 1939. He chaired Det Norske Veritas from 1929 to 1945. In 1939 he was proclaimed an honorary member of the Royal Norwegian Society of Sciences and Letters.

Political offices
| Preceded by Kristian L. Hopp | Mayor of Bergen; 1919–1922 | Succeeded by Hans Kristian Seip |
