= 1925 in Norway =

- Centuries: 18th; 19th; 20th; 21st
- Decades: 1900s; 1910s; 1920s; 1930s; 1940s
- See also: List of years in Norway

Events in the year 1925 in Norway.

== Incumbents ==
- Monarch – Haakon VII.

== Events ==
- 1 January – The city of Christiania reclaimed its original Norwegian name, Oslo; a decision which caused much debate in its time.
- 17 July – the Parliament of Norway passed the Svalbard Act (Norwegian: Lov om Svalbard or colloquially Svalbardloven) which established Norwegian sovereignty on the island of Svalbard, and stated that Norwegian criminal law, civil law and procedure law were enforced on the island.
- Municipal and county elections are held throughout the country.

== Births ==
=== January to March ===
- 7 January – Ragnar Larsen, international soccer player, manager and journalist (died 1982)
- 14 January – Tor Oftedal, politician (died 1980)
- 29 January – Ottar Gjermundshaug, Nordic combined skier (died 1963)
- 2 February – Arne Brun Lie, resistance member and author (died 2010)
- 20 February – Hans-Jørgen Holman, musicologist and educationalist (died 1986)
- 27 February – Edvin Landsem, cross country skier (died 2004)
- 4 March – Randi Thorvaldsen, speed skater (died 2011).
- 6 March – Klara Berg, politician (died 2011)
- 14 March – Reidar Hirsti, newspaper editor and politician (died 2001)

=== April to June ===
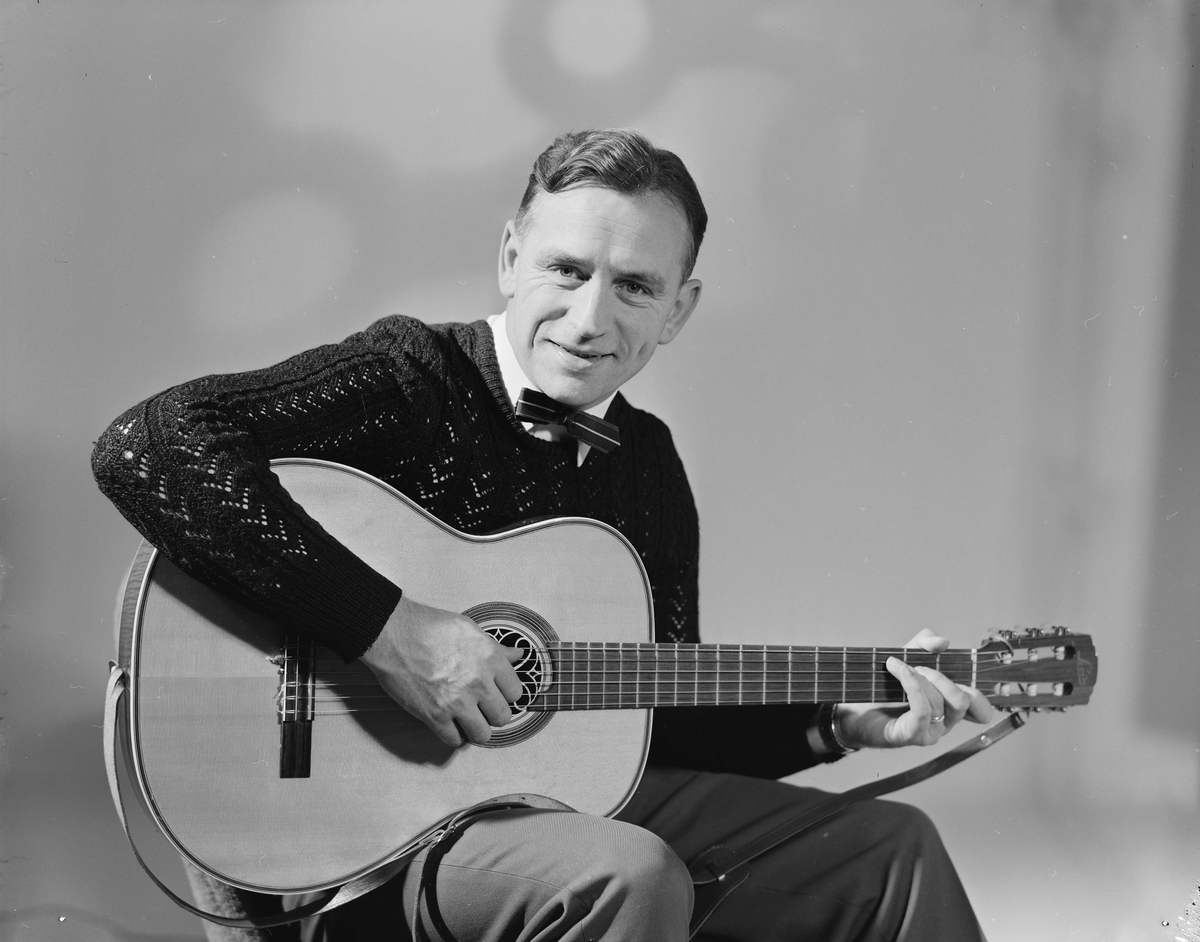
Ingebrigt Davik

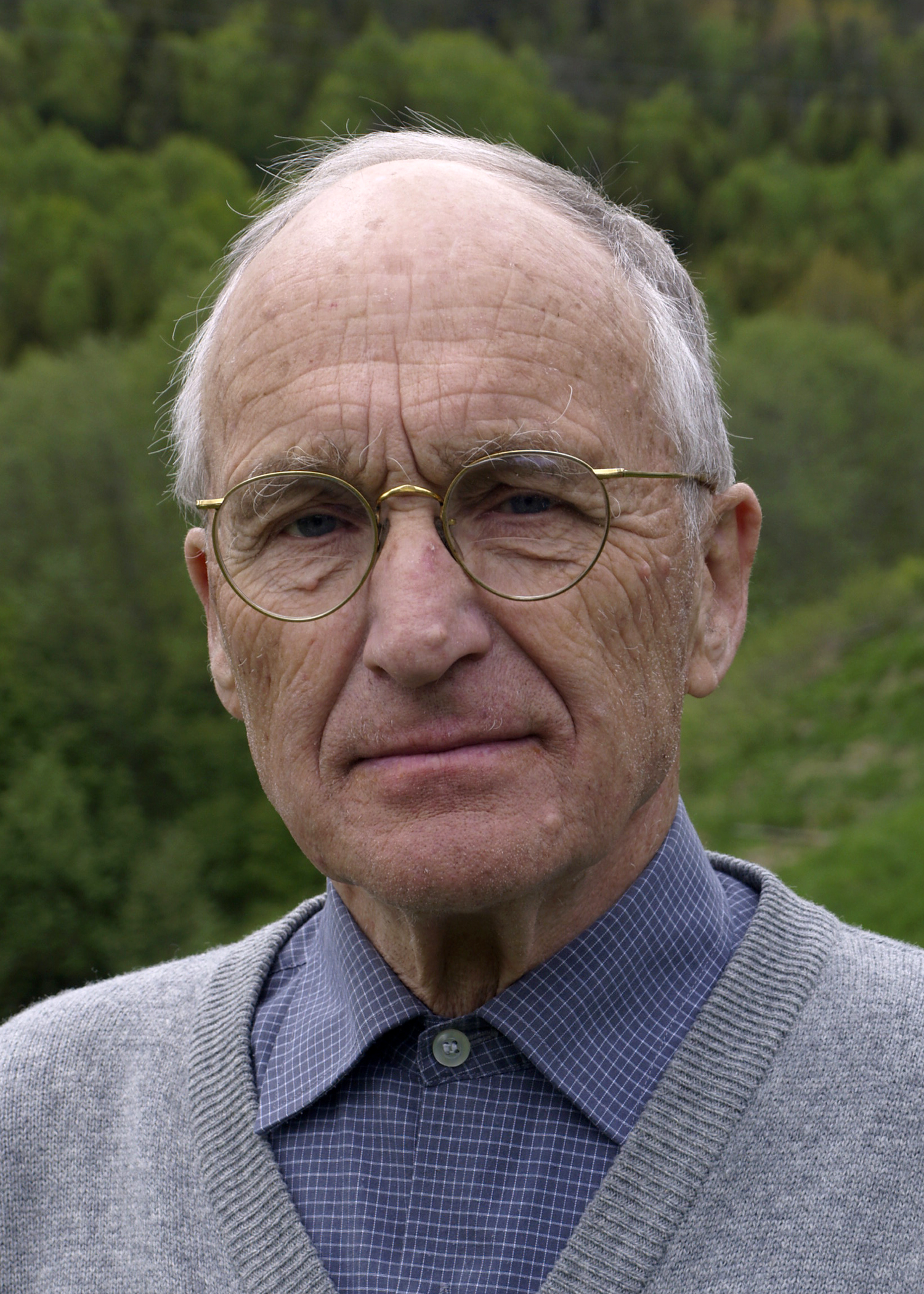
Egil A. Wyller

- 6 April – Margit Hansen-Krone, politician
- 13 April – Ingebrigt Davik, children's writer (died 1991).
- 23 April – Sverre Ingolf Haugli, speed skater and Olympic bronze medallist (died 1986)
- 24 April – Egil A. Wyller, philosopher and historian of ideas (died 2021).
- 28 April – Anne-Olaug Ingeborgrud, politician (died 2003)
- 28 April – Eskild Jensen, civil servant and politician (died 2013)
- 1 May – Bergljot Hobæk Haff, novelist (died 2016)
- 6 May – Harriet Andreassen, labour activist, politician and Minister (died 1997)
- 22 May – Barthold Halle, film director and theatre director (died 2025)
- 23 May – Oscar Reynert Olsen, illustrator, painter, graphical artist and lecturer (died 2026)
- 30 May – Rolf Bækkelund, violinist and conductor (died 2024).
- 30 May – Haakon Bjørklid, illustrator, painter, animator and printmaker (died 2020).
- 7 June – Leif Jørgen Aune, economist, politician and minister (died 2019)
- 18 June – Arnold Weiberg-Aurdal, politician (died 2016)
- 19 June – Halvor Bjellaanes, politician (died 1985)

=== July to September ===
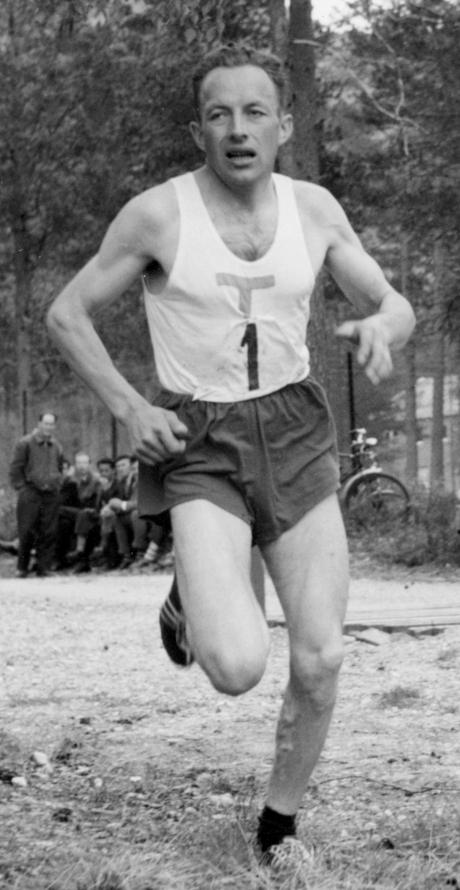
Jakob Kjersem

- 5 July – Olaf Øen, politician (died 2009)
- 28 July – Haldis Havrøy, politician (died 2000)
- 1 August – Gunnar Haugan, actor (died 2009)
- 2 August – Jakob Kjersem, long-distance runner (died 2009)
- 9 August – Anna Hannevik, Salvation Army commissioner (died 2025)
- 12 August – Andreas Frivåg, politician (died 1991)
- 13 September – Erik Grønseth, social scientist and sociologist (died 2005)
- 8 August – Astri Riddervold, chemist and ethnologist, educator, cook and writer (died 2019)
- 21 August – Odd Strand, civil servant (died 2008)
- 21 September – Konrad B. Knutsen, civil servant (died 2012)
- 27 September – Arne Sandnes, politician (died 2006)

=== October to December ===
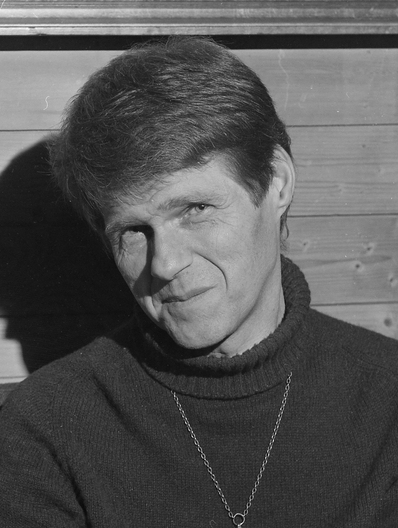
Finn Carling

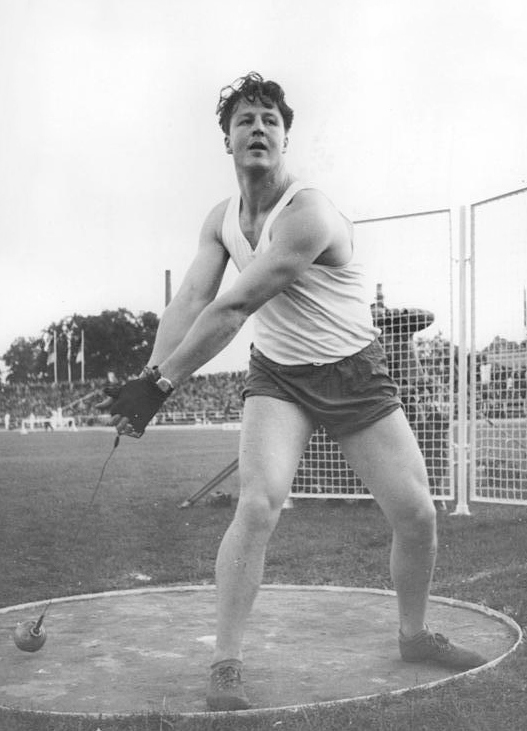
Sverre Strandli

- 1 October – Finn Carling, novelist, playwright, poet and essayist (died 2004)
- 4 October – Åge Rønning, writer and journalist (died 1991)
- 7 October – Peder P. Næsheim, politician (died 1969)
- 26 October – Anne Gullestad, actress and theatre director (died 1998)
- 2 November – Olav Sandvik, veterinarian (died 2010)
- 4 November – Egil Tveterås, encyclopedist (died 2021).
- 11 November – Tor Sørnes, engineer and inventor (died 2017)
- 18 November – Vegard Vigerust, writer (died 2020)
- 23 November – Eva Ramm, psychologist and writer (died 2026)
- 29 November – Liv Paulsen, sprinter and shot putter (died 2001)
- 30 November – Sverre Strandli, hammer thrower and European Champion (died 1985)
- 30 December – Andreas Ugland, shipowner (died 2019)

=== Full date unknown ===
- Kjell Holler, politician and minister (died 2000)
- Hermod Skånland, economist (died 2011)
- Weiert Velle, veterinarian (died 2007)

== Deaths ==
=== January to June ===
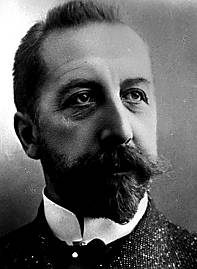
Christian Michelsen

- 18 February – August Schønemann, singer, actor and comedian (born 1891).
- 3 March – Alf Pedersen, boxer (born 1904)
- 22 March – Nils Claus Ihlen, engineer, politician and Minister (born 1855)
- 7 April – Gerhard Gran, literary historian, professor, magazine editor, essayist and biographer (born 1856)
- 1 June – Jonas Schanche Kielland, jurist and politician (born 1863)
- 29 June – Christian Michelsen, shipping magnate, politician and Prime Minister of Norway (born 1857)

=== July to December ===
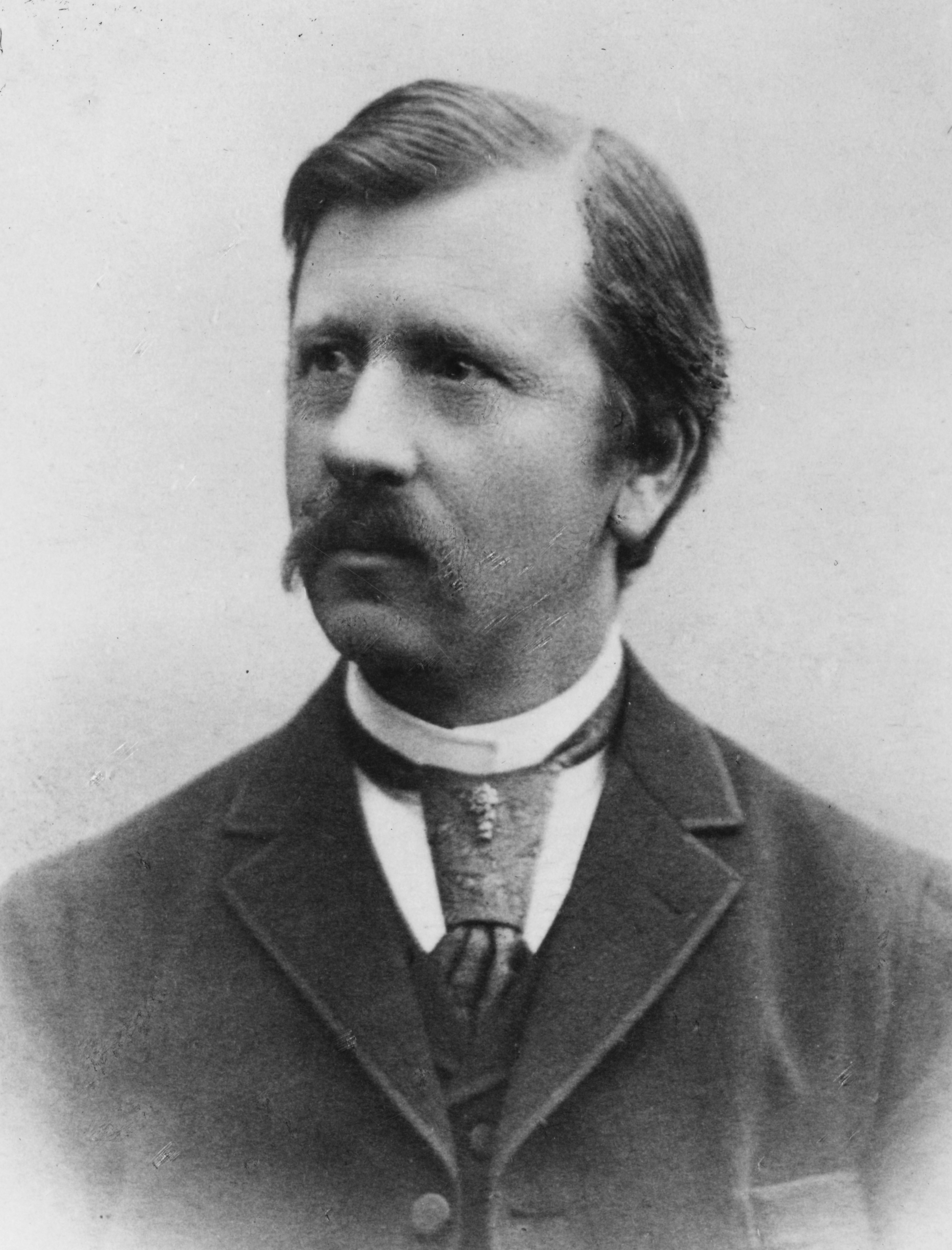
Karl Gether Bomhoff

- 4 August – Hans Christian Albert Hansen, politician (born 1847)
- 23 September – Karl Gether Bomhoff, pharmacist, politician and Governor of the Central Bank of Norway (born 1842).
- 16 October – Christian Krohg, painter, illustrator, author and journalist (born 1852)
- 15 December – Hjalmar Strømme, boxer (born 1900)
- December – Nils Waltersen Aasen, arms inventor (born 1877)

=== Full date unknown ===
- Fredrik Rosing Bull, inventor/designer of improved punched card machines (born 1882)
- Hjalmar Christensen, writer (born 1869)
- Barthold Hansteen Cranner, botanist (born 1867)
- Olaf Nordhagen, architect, engineer and artist (born 1883)
- Anton Thorkildsen Omholt, politician and Minister (born 1861)
- Johan Kristian Skougaard, military officer and politician (born 1847)
