= Tore Eriksen =

Norwegian economist, diplomat and civil servant

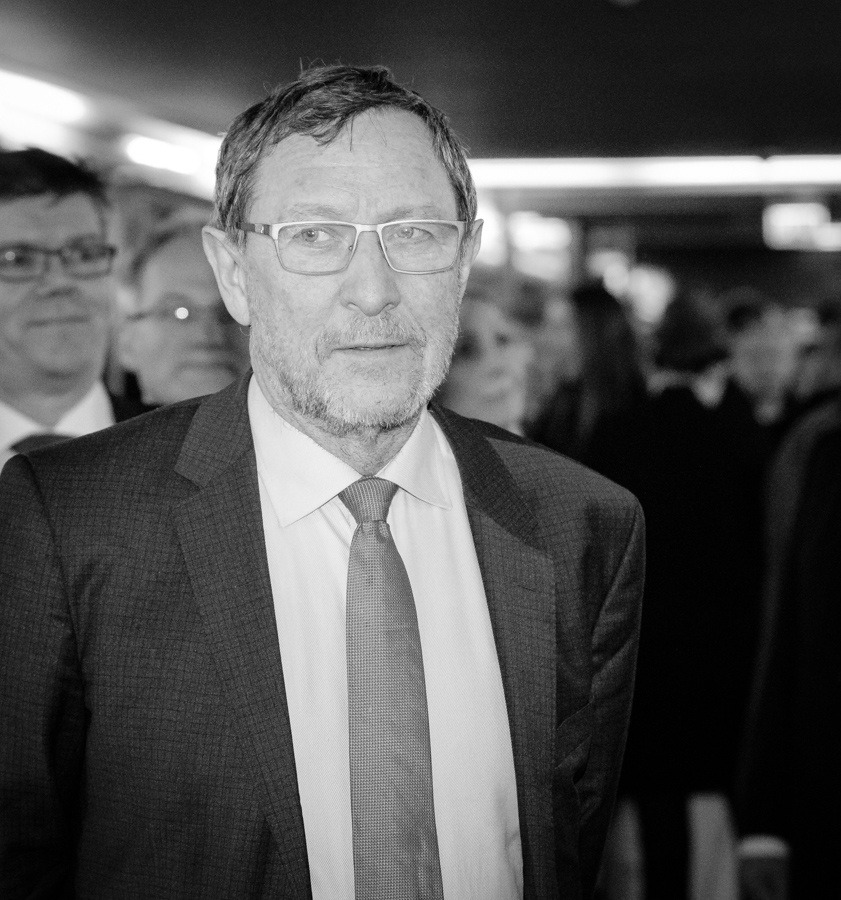
Tore Eriksen

Tore Eriksen (born 12 May 1947) is a Norwegian economist, diplomat and civil servant. He was at one time dubbed "Norway's most powerful bureaucrat".

== Career ==
He was first employed as a research assistant from 1974 to 1978. He was later hired by the Ministry of Finance and Customs in 1978, and subsequently was promoted to deputy under-secretary of State in 1991. From 1993 to 1998 he was a deputy under-secretary of State in the Office of the Prime Minister. From January 1999 to June 2011 he was the permanent under-secretary of State of the Ministry of Finance, except a period from 2002 to 2003 when Lorents Lorentsen was acting secretary. It was in this period that he, along with Jens Stoltenberg and Karl Eirik Schjøtt-Pedersen authored the so-called budgetary rule, which regulates the usage of capital gains from the oil and petroleum sector and which would play a pivotal part of the economic policy of consecutive Norwegian governments. Known as a numerical "genius", he is also credited with providing the stable fiscal policy which Norway maintained throughout the Great Recession.

Eriksen served as Norway's official ambassador to the Organisation for Economic Co-operation and Development from 2011 to 2014, when he returned to the Ministry of Finance as a special adviser.

=== Controversy ===
In August 2012 the newspaper Verdens Gang reported that Eriksen along with his wife earned more than NOK 2.5 million in salary from the Norwegian government, this was significantly higher than any other civil servant in public service and 50 percent higher than his predecessor. It was also revealed that the foreign minister Jonas Gahr Støre, his former colleague and alleged friend, had given him the very lucrative job without publicly announcing the vacancy. Additionally Eriksen received a NOK 500,000 tax-free increase due to him living abroad and a NOK 132,000 "spousal increase" due to him living with his wife. Analysts called it "special treatment" due to "close relationships" between the political elite.

== Personal life ==
He was born in Fredrikstad and is a cand.oecon. by education, having graduated from the University of Oslo in 1975.

Eriksen is married to Ann-Marit Sæbønes, a Labour party politician and former mayor of Oslo.

Civic offices
Preceded by Svein Gjedrem	Permanent under-secretary of state in the Norwegian Ministry of Finance; 1999–2011	Succeeded by Svein Gjedrem
