= Truls =

Truls or Troels is a Nordic masculine given name. Truls is mainly used in Norway, and to a lesser extent in Sweden. Troels (and the rare form Truels) is predominantly used in Denmark. It is a short form of Torgils, derived from Old Norse Þórgísl (Old Danish Thrugils, Thrugels, Old Swedish Thorgils, Thorgisl), composed of Þór-, the name of the god of thunder, and gísl "arrow, arrow-shaft".

== Troels ==
- Troels Bech (born 1966), Danish football player, then manager
- Troels Brun Folmann (born 1974), musical composer specialized in orchestral music featured in TV shows, trailers and video games
- Troels Gustavsen (born 1988), Danish singer/songwriter, part of the Danish duo Noah
- Troels Harry (born 1990), Danish curler
- Lars Troels Jørgensen (born 1978), Danish handball player
- Troels Frederik Lund (1840–1921), Danish historian
- Troels Lund Poulsen (born 1976), Danish politician and government minister
- Troels Lyby (born 1966), Danish film, television and stage actor
- Troels Nielsen or Troo.L.S (born 1982), Danish musician and music producer
- Troels Rasmussen (born 1961), Danish football (soccer) player
- Troels Svane (born 1967), Danish cellist and part of the Zapolski Quartet
- Troels Vinther (born 1987), Danish road bicycle racer
- Troels Wörsel (born 1950), Danish painter

== Truls ==
- Truls Fyhn (1945–2011), Norwegian police chief
- Truls Glesne (1916–1971), Norwegian economist and civil servant
- Truls Heggero (born 1981), Norwegian singer
- Truls Johannessen Wiel Graff (1851–1918), Norwegian county governor
- Truls Korsæth (born 1993), Norwegian cyclist
- Truls Kristiansen (born 1964), Norwegian ice hockey player
- Truls Möregårdh (born 2002), Swedish table tennis player
- Truls Mørk (born 1961), Norwegian cellist
- Truls Ove Karlsen (born 1975), Norwegian alpine skier
- Truls Wickholm (born 1978), Norwegian politician and member of parliament

== See also ==
- Trulsen (surname)
