= Øystein Olsen =

Oystein Olsen may refer to:

- Øystein Olsen (bishop) (born 1944), Norwegian Methodist bishop
- Øystein Olsen (economist) (born 1952), Norwegian economist and academic
- Øystein Olsen (ice hockey) (born 1969), Norwegian ice hockey player

== See also ==
- Olsen (surname)
