= Hermod Skånland =

Norwegian economist and civil servant

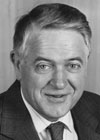

Governor of the Central Bank of Norway
- In office 1985–1993

Personal details
- Born: 15 June 1925 Tromsø
- Died: 16 April 2011 (aged 85)
- Occupation: economist

Hermod Skånland (15 June 1925 – 16 April 2011) was a Norwegian economist and civil servant, who served as the Governor of the Central Bank of Norway from 1985 to 1993.

== Biography ==
Skånland was born in Tromsø as a son of school director Peder Skånland and teacher Margit Maurstad. He finished his secondary education in 1944 and graduated with the cand.oecon. degree in 1951. He started working as a researcher in Statistics Norway, but already after one year he was hired in the Ministry of Finance as a consultant. This was not uncontroversial, as he was arguably the least experienced of the applicants. Already in 1953 he had a tenure as acting assistant secretary. He remained in the Ministry of Finance for several years, except for studies in the United States in the mid-1950s. He was promoted to assistant secretary in 1959, and in 1960 he was promoted to deputy under-secretary of state. This happened as another deputy under-secretary, Sigurd Lorentzen, left the ministry, Truls Glesne succeeded Lorentzen and Skånland succeeded Glesne. Historian Einar Lie has noted that this shuffle "gave room for Hermod Skånland, the 'wonderboy' of the economists".

Skånland served as the Governor of the Central Bank of Norway from 1985 to 1993, having served since 1971 as the Deputy Governor. Already as Deputy Governor he held a strong position, particularly when Governor Knut Getz Wold became ill. In 1983, as Deputy Governor, Skånland led the selection committee Tempoutvalget which conducted a public inquiry for the Ministry of Energy titled "The future of the petroleum industry". The contributions of this committee played a significant role in the establishment of the Government Petroleum Fund in 1990, which is now known as the Government Pension Fund of Norway. Skånland was also a member of several public boards in this period, as well as chairman of Statistics Norway from 1981 to 1993, and board member of NTNF from 1979 to 1985 and the Nordic Investment Bank from 1976 to 1988. From 1994 to 2003 he was an assisting professor at the BI School of Management. He has also been vice president of the Norwegian branch of UNICEF. He is a member of the Norwegian Labour Party.

He was decorated as a Commander of the Royal Norwegian Order of St. Olav (1987), and held foreign orders of knighthood. He received the Fritt Ord Honorary Award in 1980, and a festschrift to him was issued in 1994.

In 1998 he was appointed as a Commander with Star of Finland's Order of the Lion and as a Commander with Star of the Icelandic Order of the Falcon. He received the Luxembourg Order of Merit (Commander) and in 1990 he was awarded the 1998 Economist Award.

Skånland died at Fagertun nursing home in Gran Municipality, at the age of 85. He was survived by one daughter.

Government offices
Preceded by Knut Getz Wold	Central Bank Governor of Norway; 1985–1993	Succeeded by Torstein Moland
