= Tobacco Authority of Thailand =

Thai state enterprise for tobacco products

- Native name: การยาสูบแห่งประเทศไทย
- Formerly: Thailand Tobacco Monopoly (TTM)
- Type: Government-owned
- Industry: Tobacco
- Predecessor: Thailand Tobacco Monopoly (TTM)
- Founded: April 19, 1939 (as TTM); May 14, 2018 (as TOAT)
- Headquarters: Khlong Toei, Bangkok, Thailand
- Number of locations: 7 (2018)
- Area served: Thailand
- Key people: Poomjit Pongpanngam (Governor)
- Products: Tobacco and cigarettes
- Revenue: ▲ ฿41.124 billion (FY2023)
- Net income: ▲ ฿221.46 million (FY2023)
- Total assets: ▼ ฿22.743 billion (FY2023)
- Number of employees: 2,235 (2024)
- Parent: Ministry of Finance
- Website: Official website

The Tobacco Authority of Thailand(TOAT) (Thai: การยาสูบแห่งประเทศไทย; RTGS: Kan Ya Sup Haeng Prathet Thai) , is a Thai state enterprise and the sole legal entity permitted to produce tobacco products in the country, mostly cigarettes. It was previously known as the Thailand Tobacco Monopoly (TTM), and operated as a non-juristic state enterprise under the Ministry of Finance until 14 May 2018 when it was corporatized as a juristic organization and assumed its new name.

In its early days, the TTM had a monopoly over the manufacturing and distribution of tobacco products. The ratification of the ASEAN Free Trade Area agreement in 1992 meant that foreign tobacco companies could now distribute their own cigarettes in Thailand, and foreign companies could share in the Thai market.

As of 14 May 2018, the Thailand Tobacco Monopoly was corporatized as the Tobacco Authority of Thailand. According to the Tobacco Authority of Thailand Act 2018 as announced in the Royal Thai Government Gazette, the act allows TOAT to set up limited companies or public companies related to TOAT's business. These companies are permitted to have foreign shareholders hold up to 49 percent of total company shares. TOAT can also hold shares in other companies if relevant to TOAT's business.

== History ==
The Thailand Tobacco Monopoly was established in 1939, initially in collaboration with British American Tobacco, but since 1949 it has operated solely under the control of the Ministry of Finance.

TTM was a top financial contributor to the Thai treasury and has contributed funds to local administrative organisations as well as purchasing product at above market rates from 15,000 tobacco farming households nationwide who collectively farm 80,000-90,000 rai.

== Operations ==
TTM purchased tobacco leaf through eight offices around the country, and also imports some tobacco from international suppliers. TTM produces nine brands of cigarettes. Sales in 2009 were 50 billion baht, including exports. Net profits were 5.8 billion baht. Export sales in 2009 were down 60 percent on 2008. TTM's brands are Krongthip, Wonder, Falling Rain 90, Goal, LINE, Royal 90, Samit 90, SMS, and Gold City 90. At the end of 2009, the TTM had a total of 4,247 employees.

The TTM was one of the most profitable state enterprises, returning substantial revenues to the state treasury.

In November 2011, TTM announced it was looking for a tie up with a global tobacco company in order to enhance TTM's technology and management. Though TTM has a domestic-market volume share of 79 percent, foreign tobacco products have a 75 percent share of the market's value. The TTM is aiming to improve the efficiency of its operations before tobacco import duties are eliminated under the ASEAN Free Trade Area agreement and the ASEAN Economic Community (AEC) is formed in 2015.

TTM operates a seven facilities across the country, on a total land area of 7,000 rai (11 km^{2}). Cigarettes are manufactured at three locations in Bangkok and also at a new factory in Ayutthaya. All cigarette manufacturing will be moved to Ayutthaya by 2020 and the Bangkok factories will be shut down. The new factory, opened 27 August 2018, will have a production capacity of 60,000 cigarettes per day.

In 2016 TTM revenues were more than 72 billion baht (US$2.1 billion). In fiscal year 2017, TOAT reported revenues of 68,176 million baht, total assets of 27,797 million baht, net profit of 9,343 million baht. It contributed 62,577 million baht to the Thai treasury. For 2018 TTM expects to earn below 70 billion due to projected market share losses.

== Management ==
The TTM is managed by a board of directors and an executive team led by the managing director. As of 2018 Ms Daonoi Suttiniphapunt is managing director of TTM. The acting chairman of TTM is Mr. Amnuay Preemanawong, who is also the Inspector General of the Ministry of Finance.

TTM employs about 3,000 workers (March 2018).

== Electronic cigarettes ==
Electronic cigarettes have been outlawed in Thailand since 2014. In mid-2019, the prime minister reaffirmed his pledge to keep e-cigarettes banned. Prime Minister Prayut Chan-o-cha said that, "...the government cannot simply consider the economic impact...E-cigarettes will impact people's health and place an extra burden on the country's health-care budget". He went on to say that the Public Health Ministry should work harder to educate the public on the health effects of vaping, while officials should crack down further on the illegal sale of e-cigarettes.

== Excise taxation ==
In September 2017 the Excise Department raised taxes on cigarettes. Under the new rules, packs of cigarettes with a retail price over 60 baht are subject to a 40 percent excise tax levy while cheaper packs incur a lower rate of 20 percent. Foreign manufacturers subsequently lowered their prices to avoid the high tax. TTM is unable to lower its prices due to the high cost of Thai tobacco, 22 baht per kilogramme, which is higher than the world market price, and it high costs of manufacturing and overhead. As a result, its market share has plunged to about 55 percent of the market, down from 80 percent before the tax changes. TTM's sales fell sharply to 30 billion cigarettes from 42 billion a year after the excise tax structure was revamped. For FY2018 TTM projects a loss of 1.5 billion baht, the first shortfall in its 79-year history.

== Controversies ==
In August 2010, three major US tobacco merchants pleaded guilty to charges relating to the payment of bribes to officials of TTM. According to US court documents, from 2000 to 2004, subsidiaries of Dimon Inc., Standard Commercial Corp., and Universal Corp., sold Brazilian-grown tobacco to TTM. Each of the three companies retained sales agents in Thailand, and collaborated through those agents to apportion tobacco sales to TTM among themselves, coordinate their sales prices, and pay kickbacks to TTM officials in order to ensure that each company would share in the Thai tobacco market. To obtain these sales contracts, Dimon paid bribes to TTM officials totalling US$542,590 and Standard paid bribes totaling US$696,160, during the course of the four years. Universal admitted that its subsidiary in Brazil paid approximately US$697,000 in kickbacks to TTM officials over the period.

In May 2005 Dimon Inc. and Standard Commercial Corp. merged to form Alliance One International, a leading independent leaf tobacco merchant serving the world's largest cigarette manufacturers.
