= Einar Grøstad =

Norwegian jurist and civil servant

Einar Grøstad (1902–1983) was a Norwegian jurist and civil servant.

He graduated with the cand.jur. degree in 1925, and worked as a deputy judge in Romsdal from 1928 to 1930. In 1930 he was hired in the Ministry of Finance, advancing to assistant secretary in 1935. In 1948 he was promoted to deputy under-secretary of state in the Ministry of Defence from 1948 to 1954, before serving as deputy under-secretary of state in the Ministry of Finance from 1954 to 1972. He had a short hiatus from 1959 to 1960, when he was the director of Statens bygge- og eiendomsdirektorat.

He had applied for the position in the Ministry of Finance in 1951, when Friedrich Georg Nissen was to be succeeded, and all deputy under-secretaries agreed that he was the best qualified among the applicants. However, Sigurd Lorentzen was chosen, by Minister of Finance Trygve Bratteli. In 1957, both Grøstad and Lorentzen applied to become the successor of Nissen as permanent under-secretary of state. However, they were both jurists, and economist Eivind Erichsen was chosen by Bratteli.

In Det nordiske administrative forbund, Grøstad was the president from 1963 to 1971, and later an honorary member. He was also decorated with the Royal Norwegian Order of St. Olav. He died in the autumn of 1983.
