= UVV =

UVV may refer to:

- Unfallverhütungsvorschriften
- UVV Utrecht
- Universidade Vila Velha
- Unie Vrijzinnige Verenigingen
- Universal Corporation, NYSE stock ticker symbol UVV

== See also ==
- Ukrainian Liberation Army
