= Nymo =

Nymo is a name of Norwegian origin, used as both a surname and a forename.

Notable people with the surname include:

- Atle Nymo (born 1977), Norwegian musician
- Birger Nymo (born 1950), Norwegian politician
- Frode Nymo (born 1975), Norwegian musician
- Johan Nymo (1908-1997), Norwegian folk musician
- Knut-Oscar Nymo (born 1985), Norwegian bass player
- Randi Nymo (born 1949), Norwegian professor
- Svein Nymo (1953–2014), Norwegian violinist and composer
- Tor Nymo (born 1940), Norwegian politician

Notable people with the middle name include:

- Anne Nymo Trulsen (born 1978), Norwegian singer
- Jo Nymo Matland (born 1987), Norwegian footballer
- Lars Nymo Trulsen (born 1976), Norwegian footballer
