= Kjersem =

Kjersem is a Norwegian surname. Notable people with the surname include:

- Hilde Marie Kjersem (born 1981), Norwegian artist, musician, and songwriter
- Jakob Kjersem (1925–2009), Norwegian long-distance runner
