= Government Pension Fund of Norway =

Norwegian sovereign-wealth fund

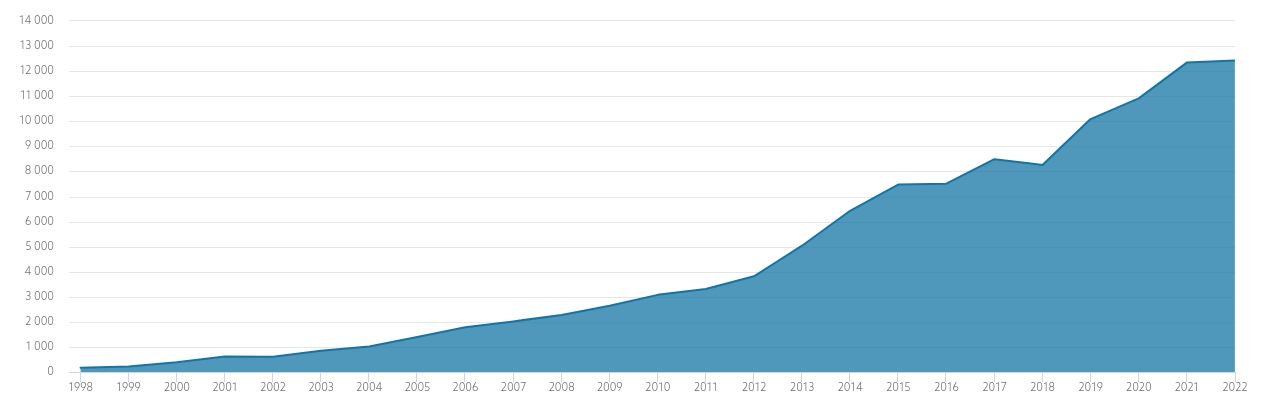
- Value of the fund over time in billion krone
- Type: State-owned
- Founded: 1967; 1990
- Headquarters: Oslo, Norway
- AUM: ▲US$ 2.499 trillion (October 2026)
- Total assets: 9,271,907,928,629 Norwegian krone (2019)
- Owner: Council of State; Government Pension Fund Global managed by state-owned Norges Bank

The Government Pension Fund of Norway (Norwegian: Statens pensjonsfond) is the sovereign wealth fund collectively owned by the Government of Norway. It consists of two entirely separate sovereign wealth funds: the Government Pension Fund Global (Norges Bank Investment Management) and the Government Pension Fund Norway.

The Government Pension Fund Global (Statens pensjonsfond utland), also known as the Oil Fund (Oljefondet), was established in 1990 to invest the surplus revenues of the Norwegian petroleum sector. As of July 2026, it had over US$2.2 trillion in assets, equal to 1.5% of the value of the world's listed companies, making it the world's largest sovereign wealth fund in terms of total assets under management. This translates to over US$390,000 per Norwegian citizen. It also holds portfolios of real estate and fixed-income investments. Many companies are excluded by the fund on ethical grounds.

The Government Pension Fund Norway (Statens pensjonsfond Norge) is smaller and was established in 1967 as a type of national insurance fund. It is managed separately from the Oil Fund and is limited to domestic and Nordic investments and is therefore a key stock holder in many large Norwegian companies, predominantly via the Oslo Stock Exchange.

== Government Pension Fund Global ==
The Government Pension Fund Global (Norwegian: Statens pensjonsfond Utland, SPU) is a fund into which the surplus wealth produced by Norwegian petroleum income is deposited. Its name changed in January 2006 from the Petroleum Fund of Norway. The fund is commonly referred to as the Oil Fund (Oljefondet).

The purpose of the fund is to invest parts of the large surplus generated by the Norwegian petroleum sector, mainly from taxes of companies but also payment for licenses to explore for oil as well as the State's Direct Financial Interest and dividends from the partly state-owned Equinor. Current revenue from the petroleum sector is estimated to be at its peak period and to decline in the future decades. The Petroleum Fund was established in 1990 after a decision by the country's legislature to counter the effects of the forthcoming decline in income and to smooth out the disruptive effects of highly fluctuating oil prices.

As its name suggests, the Government Pension Fund Global is invested in international financial markets, so the risk is independent from the Norwegian economy. The fund was valued at NOK 22.683 trillion at the end of June 2026. At year-end 2025, the overall fund value was NOK 21.268 trillion, while the investment portfolio's market value before deferred tax and accrued management fees was NOK 21.286 trillion. At that year-end, the fund was invested in 7,201 listed companies, and its investments spanned 68 countries and 41 currencies. Its 2025 return was 15.1 percent before management costs, measured in its currency basket; in accounting terms, the return was NOK 2.362 trillion.

=== Background ===
Norway has experienced economic surpluses since the development of its hydrocarbon resources in the 1970s. This reality, coupled with the desire to mitigate volatility stemming from fluctuating oil prices, motivated the creation of Norway's Oil Fund, now the Government Pension Fund-Global (GPF-G). The instability of oil prices has been of constant concern for oil-dependent countries since the start of the oil boom, but especially so in the decades following the first oil shocks in the 1970s. As the real GDP of oil-exporting states is linked with the price of oil, it has been a goal of these exporters to stabilize oil consumption patterns, and a host of these exporting states singled out sovereign wealth funds as an effective policy tool for achieving this outcome. The adoption of the GPF-G has been in line with the global economic trends, especially investment patterns. International investment has increased at a significantly higher pace than either global GDP or global trade of goods and services, increasing by 175% over a period at which the former two metrics increased by 53% and 93% respectively.

=== Management and size ===
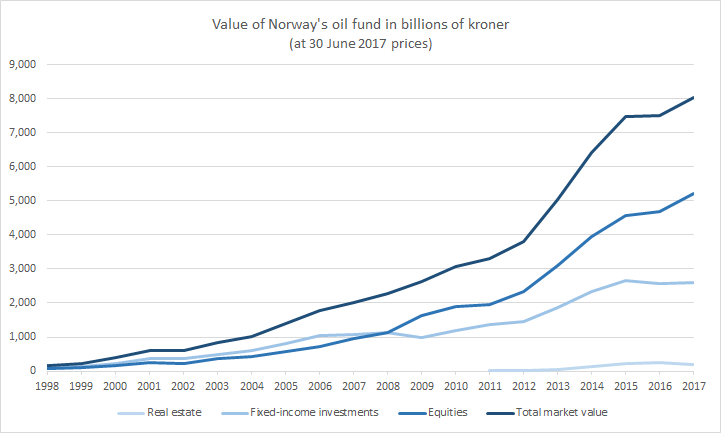
Value of the Oil Fund in billions of kroner (June 2017 prices)

The domestic fund, the Government Pension Fund Norway, is managed by Folketrygdfondet. The global investment fund is managed by Norges Bank Investment Management (NBIM), part of the Norwegian Central Bank on the behalf of the Ministry of Finance.

As of June 2011, it was the largest pension fund in the world, but it is not a pension fund in the conventional sense, as it derives its financial backing from oil profits, not pension contributions. In September 2017, the fund exceeded US$1 trillion in value for the first time, a thirteen-fold increase since 2002. With a population of 5.2 million people, the fund was worth $192,307 per Norwegian citizen. Of the assets, 65% were equities (accounting for 1.3% of global equity markets), and the rest were property and fixed-income investments. Norway can withdraw up to 3% of the fund's value each year. The first withdrawal in its history was made in 2016. In a parliamentary white paper in April 2011, the Norwegian Ministry of Finance forecast that the fund would reach $1 trillion by the end of 2019. According to the forecast, a worst-case scenario for the fund value in 2030 was forecast at $455 billion, and a best case scenario at $3.3 trillion. With 2.33 percent of European stocks, it is the largest stock owner in Europe.

In 1998, the fund was allowed to invest up to 40 percent of its portfolio in the international stock market. In June 2009, the ministry decided to raise the stock portion to 60 percent. In May 2014, the Central Bank governor proposed raising the rate to 70 percent. The Norwegian government planned that up to 5 percent of the fund should be invested in real estate, beginning in 2010. A specific policy for the real estate investments was suggested in a report the Swiss Partners Group wrote for the Norwegian Ministry of Finance.

Norway's sovereign wealth fund is taking steps to become more active in company governance. In the second quarter of 2013, the sovereign fund voted in 6,078 general meetings as well as 239 shareholder proposals on environmental and social issues. Norway's Government Pension Fund Global (GPFG) has the potential to influence the corporate governance market in Europe, and possibly China as well, greatly. It has also started to become active in pushing for lower executive pay.

In 2019, the Government Pension Fund received a perfect score of 100 in the Sovereign Wealth Fund Transparency and Accountability Scoreboard published by the Peterson Institute for International Economics, ranking it first among 64 sovereign wealth funds worldwide.

==== Largest investments ====
The fund's largest holdings in the global stock and bond markets in the second quarter of 2026 were:

Company/Bonds	Country	Market value in US$ mn.	Stake
US Treasury bonds	United States	209,985	...
Nvidia	United States	61,847	1.28%
Apple	United States	52,719	1.24%
Alphabet Inc.	United States	50,466	1.17%
Microsoft	United States	35,113	1.27%
TSMC	Taiwan	33,525	1.70%
Amazon.com	United States	31,867	1.24%
Japanese government bonds	Japan	25,499	...
Broadcom	United States	23,403	1.30%
Samsung Electronics	South Korea	22,512	1.88%
British government bonds	United Kingdom	19,677	...
ASML	Netherlands	17,686	2.32%
SK Hynix	South Korea	17,593	1.44%
Meta Platforms	United States	17,048	1.19%
German government bonds	Germany	16,427	...
Micron Technology	United States	16,241	1.25%
Tesla, Inc.	United States	15,720	1.00%
Eli Lilly	United States	13,119	1.16%
Monetary Authority of Singapore bonds	Singapore	12,888	...
Canadian government bonds	Canada	12,344	...
AMD	United States	12,357	1.30%
Berkshire Hathaway	United States	11,758	0.59%
JPMorgan Chase	United States	11,660	1.34%

== Relationship to sovereignty ==
The rise of globalization as the predominant political-economic system has had several key effects on states, especially in regard to interdependence and sovereignty. The erosion of fully independent socioeconomic structures has provoked new questions regarding the role of the state and its ability to project its sovereignty on a set of global economic systems that seem largely out of reach both legally and pragmatically for most states. Sovereign wealth funds are an inherently nationalist type of investment vehicle, and there exists potential for their use as a mitigating force to the supranational forces of globalization. The issue with this is that such practices may lead to a general increase in protectionism as nations attempt to wrestle back control of their economies from external forces, an outcome that most economic intergovernmental organizations, such as the International Monetary Fund, would like to see avoided. Some commentators, like Professor Gordon L. Clark of the University of Oxford, express concerns regarding non-profit considerations motivating the practices of the GPF-G, especially in regards to its ethical concerns and how these considerations may be used as a means of exerting Norwegian standards on foreign firms. On the other hand, the OECD has stated that sovereign wealth funds have had a stabilizing influence on international markets due to their ability to provide capital during times of domestic investor pessimism. The OECD has taken steps to minimize the possibilities of economic protectionism by instituting the Freedom of Investment project, where participating states agree upon guiding sets of principles that seek to boost transparency and transnational investment, while also advising states on how to best handle issues of foreign investment in the sphere of national security.

=== Debate ===
As a result of the large size of the fund relative to the low number of people living in Norway (5.6 million as of August 2026), the Oil Fund has become a hot political issue, dominated by three main issues:

- Whether the country should use more of the petroleum revenues for the state budget instead of saving the funds for the future. The main matter of debate is to what degree increased government spending would increase inflation.
- Whether the high level of exposure (around 72 percent as of June 2026) to the volatile stock market is financially safe. Others claim that the high diversification and extreme long-term nature of the investments will dilute the risk and that the state is losing considerable amounts of money because of the low investment percentage in the stock market.
- Whether the Petroleum Fund is practicing socially responsible investing.

== Concerns and potential outcomes ==
There are diverse concerns and predicted effects of sovereign wealth funds on international financial markets and the global economy as a whole, with experts expressing strong fears regarding destabilization and protectionism stemming from sovereign wealth funds. The destabilization argument, often cited by Roland Beck of the European Central Bank, is that non-market investment motives may lead sovereign wealth funds managers to make decisions that go against market logic, in turn causing an unexpected and potentially disastrous ripple effect. The protectionist argument, mentioned above in relation to sovereignty and sovereign wealth funds, is essentially a fear that sovereign wealth funds could be used in a non-market, protectionist manner where competing states would perpetuate ever-increasing anti-global free trade movements. However, despite these fears, there is also strong evidence to suggest that sovereign wealth funds are unlikely to gain board of directors seats in their acquisitions. Additionally, Norway's GPF-G is especially unlikely to gain any board-of-directors seats in a company headquartered in an OECD country. Furthermore, some experts directly contradict fears regarding the destabilizing effect of sovereign wealth funds, arguing that these funds increase the stability of global finance due to the fact that they serve to increase the variety of owners of risky financial vehicles, minimizing exposure to shocks in any one particular industry, while also simultaneously limiting the absolute loss any actor can suffer in a particular global economic sector.

=== Ethical council ===
Part of the investment policy debate is related to the discovery of several cases of investment by The Petroleum Fund in very controversial companies, involved in businesses such as arms production, tobacco and fossil fuels. The Petroleum Fund's Advisory Council on Ethics was established 19 November 2004 by royal decree. Accordingly, the Ministry of Finance issued a new regulation on the management of the Government Petroleum Fund, which also includes ethical guidelines.

According to its ethical guidelines, the Norwegian pension fund cannot invest money in companies that directly or indirectly contribute to killing, torture, deprivation of freedom or other violations of human rights in conflict situations or wars. Contrary to popular belief, the fund is allowed to invest in a number of arms-producing companies, as only some kind of weapons, such as nuclear arms, are banned by the ethical guidelines as investment objects.

To support the ethical screening process, the Council on Ethics works with RepRisk ESG Business Intelligence, a global research firm and provider of environmental, social and governance (ESG) risk data. RepRisk monitors the companies in the Norwegian Pension Fund's portfolio for issues such as severe human rights violations, particularly regarding child labor, forced labour, and violations of individual rights in conflict areas as well as gross environmental degradation and corruption. RepRisk has been working with the Council on Ethics since 2009 and in 2014, re-won the tender for ESG data provision for 2014–2017.

An investigation by the Norwegian business newspaper Dagens Næringsliv in February 2012 showed that Norway has invested more than $2 billion in 15 technology companies producing technology that can and has been used for filtering, wiretapping, or surveillance of communication in various countries, among them Iran, Syria, and Burma. Although surveillance tech is not the primary activity of all the 15 companies, they have all had or still have some kind of connection to such technology. The Ministry of Finance in Norway stated that it would not withdraw investing in these companies or discuss an eventual exclusion of surveillance industry companies from its investments.

On 19 January 2010 the Ministry of Finance announced that 17 tobacco companies had been excluded from the fund. The total divestment from these companies was $2 billion (NOK 14.2 billion), making it the largest divestment caused by ethical recommendations in the history of the fund.

In March 2014, as the result of both domestic and international pressure, the parliament appointed a panel to investigate whether the fund should divest its coal assets in line with its ethical investment mandate. The panel released its recommendations in December 2014, recommending the fund follow a strategy of corporate engagement rather than divestment. The parliament was set to make its decision early in 2015. In the event, the fund will be required to divest from companies that derive at least 30% of their business from coal.

In 2014, the fund divested from 53 coal companies around the world, including 16 companies in the US (among them Peabody Energy, Arch Coal, and Alpha Natural Resources), 13 companies in India (including Coal India) and 3 companies in China. As a result, the total value of the fund's coal holdings fell by 5% to $9.7 billion. In 2014, the fund also sold its stakes in 59 out of 90 oil and gas companies in which it holds shares by $30 billion. In May 2015, the Norwegian parliament endorsed the divestment of $945 million of the fund from coal assets. By June 2015, over $8 billion in coal assets were agreed to be sold, the largest in the 122 affected companies was UK’s SSE, where the fund held $956 million in shares.

On 8 March 2019, the Ministry of Finance recommended divestiture from its oil and gas exploration and production holdings. This came after the August 2017 Lofoten Declaration which demanded leadership in a global fossil fuel phase-out from the countries that can most afford to act, such as Norway.

Green energy is becoming an important aspect for the Government Pension Fund since fossil fuel stocks simply are not producing as much value as they used to. As of 2019, new guidelines will prohibit the fund from investing in companies that produce over 20 million tons of coal annually. The fund plans to sell off over $10 billion in stocks from companies using too many fossil fuels. In hopes of improving the Norwegian economy, the firm is becoming more environmentally-friendly by investing in companies that promote renewable energy. For example, the fund will continue to hold stakes in firms like Shell using renewable energy divisions.

In March 2021, it was reported that the Government Pension Fund was examining whether companies in the fund had used forced labor from Xinjiang re-education camps.

On 1 December 2021, the fund's head of Governance and Compliance, Carine Smith Ihenacho, told Reuters that companies in its portfolio will be asked to take more specific action on climate change.

On 11 August 2025, the fund reported it was terminating contracts with asset managers in Israel, as well as divesting portions of its portfolio relating to Israel, following a report that the fund had built a stake in an Israeli jet engine group that provides services to Israel's armed forces. Norway's parliament mandated a review of the ethical guidelines governing the nation's $2.1 trillion sovereign wealth fund. The fund has divested its shares in Caterpillar, and some Israeli companies, on ethical grounds.

=== Excluded companies ===
The following companies have been excluded from the Government Pension Fund of Norway for activities in breach of the ethical guidelines:

Company	HQ	Date of exclusion	Reason	Divestment (Millions USD)
Africa Israel Investments	Israel	24 August 2010	Violation of international humanitarian law in occupied Palestinian territory by being involved in developing settlements	1.2
Alliance One International, Inc.	USA	19 January 2010	Production of tobacco.	0.9
Alliant Techsystems Inc	USA	30 June 2005	Production of components for cluster munitions.	N/A (Note: The total divestment from the seven companies Alliant Techsystems Inc, EADS Co (European Aeronautic Defence and Space Company), General Dynamics Corporation, L3 Communications Holdings Inc, Lockheed Martin Corp, Raytheon Co and Thales SA was approx. $340 million.)
Altria Group Inc.	USA	19 January 2010	Production of tobacco.	131
Bank Hapoalim	Israel	2 July 2025	Due to risk of serious violations of the rights of individuals in situations of war and conflict.	
Bank Leumi	Israel	2 July 2025	Due to risk of serious violations of the rights of individuals in situations of war and conflict.	
Barrick Gold Corporation	Canada	30 January 2009	Extensive environmental degradation related to the Porgera Gold Mine in Papua New Guinea	245
Babcock & Wilcox	USA	11 January 2013	Production of nuclear arms	N/A
Boeing Company	USA	11 October 2005	Maintenance of ICBMs for the U.S. Air Force.	N/A (Note: The total divestment from the seven companies BAE Systems Plc, Boeing Co., Finmeccanica S.p.A., Honeywell International Inc., Northrop Grumman Corp., Safran SA and United Technologies Corp was apx. 500 million USD.)
British American Tobacco BHD	Malaysia	19 January 2010	Production of tobacco.	9.4
British American Tobacco Plc.	United Kingdom	19 January 2010	Production of tobacco.	683
Caterpillar Inc.	USA	2 July 2025	Due to risk of serious violations of the rights of individuals in situations of war and conflict.	2100
Danya Cebus	Israel	24 August 2010	Violation of the Geneva Convention in occupied Palestinian territory by being involved in developing settlements	N/A
Duke Energy +3 subsidiaries	USA	7 September 2016	Risk of severe environmental damage	300 (or more)
Airbus	France; Germany; Netherlands; Spain	30 June 2005	Production of nuclear missiles for the French Air Force through the company MBDA (Note: EADS was initially excluded because it produced cluster munitions components, but the company later stopped such production. The exclusion was upheld because of the company's production of nuclear missiles.)	N/A
Elbit Systems	Israel	3 September 2009	Supply of surveillance systems for the Israeli West Bank barrier	5.0
First International Bank of Israel	Israel	2 July 2025	Due to risk of serious violations of the rights of individuals in situations of war and conflict.	
Freeport McMoRan Copper & Gold Inc.	USA	28 March 2006	Serious environmental damage.	17.2
G4S	UK	14 November 2019	Serious or systematic human rights violations	N/A
GenCorp, Inc. (now Aerojet Rocketdyne Holdings, Inc.)	USA	15 November 2007	Production of nuclear weapons.	N/A
General Dynamics Corporation	USA	30 June 2005	Production of components for cluster munitions.	N/A
Grupo Carso SAB de CV	Mexico	15 February 2011	Production of tobacco.	N/A
Gudang Garam tbk pt	Indonesia	19 January 2010	Production of tobacco.	0
Hanwha Corporation	South Korea	15 May 2007	Production of cluster munitions.	1.2
Honeywell International Inc.	USA	11 October 2005	Simulations of nuclear explosions.	N/A
Huabao International Holdings Limited	Hong Kong	8 May 2013	Production of tobacco	N/A
Imperial Brands Plc	United Kingdom	19 January 2010	Production of tobacco.	347
ITC Ltd.	India	19 January 2010	Production of tobacco.	48
Japan Tobacco Inc.	Japan	19 January 2010	Production of tobacco.	210
Jacobs Engineering Group	USA	11 January 2013	Production of nuclear arms	N/A
KT&G Corp.	South Korea	19 January 2010	Production of tobacco.	16
Lingui Development Berhad Ltd.	Malaysia	16 February 2011	Severe environmental damages	N/A
Li-Ning	China	8 March 2022	Human rights abuse	
Lockheed Martin Corp	USA	30 June 2005	Production of components for cluster munitions.	N/A
Lorillard Inc.	USA	19 January 2010	Production of tobacco.	42
Madras Aluminium	United Kingdom	31 October 2007	Severe environmental damages	N/A
Mizrahi Tefahot Bank Ltd	Israel	2 July 2025	Due to risk of serious violations of the rights of individuals in situations of war and conflict.	
Norilsk Nickel	Russia	31 October 2009	Severe environmental damages	N/A
Northrop Grumman Corp.	USA	11 October 2005	Maintenance of ICBMs for the U.S. Air Force.	N/A
Philip Morris International Inc.	USA	19 January 2010	Production of tobacco.	476
Philip Morris ČR a.s. (a subsidiary of Philip Morris International)	Czech Republic	19 January 2010	Production of tobacco.	2.7
Poongsan Corporation	South Korea	30 September 2006	Production of cluster munition.	1.2
Potash Corporation of Saskatchewan	Canada	30 September 2011	Production of phosphate in the occupied territories of Western Sahara.	274
Raytheon Company	USA	30 June 2005	Production of components for cluster munitions.	N/A
Reynolds American Inc.	USA	19 January 2010	Production of tobacco.	36
Samling Global Ltd.	Malaysia	23 August 2010	Illegal logging and severe environmental damage	1.4
SAFRAN SA	France	11 October 2005	Production of nuclear missiles for the French Navy.	N/A
Serco Group plc	United Kingdom	15 November 2007	Maintenance of British nuclear weapons through the Atomic Weapons Establishment.	N/A
Sesa Sterlite Limited	India	30 January 2014	Severe environmental damages	N/A
Schweitzer-Mauduit International Inc.	USA	8 May 2013	Production of tobacco	N/A
Shanghai Industrial Holdings	China	15 March 2011	Production of tobacco	N/A
Shikun UVinui	Israel	17 June 2012	Violation of the Geneva Convention in occupied Palestinian territory by being involved in developing settlements	1.4
Souza Cruz SA	Brazil	19 January 2010	Production of tobacco.	7.4
Sterlite Industries	India	31 October 2007	Severe environmental damages	N/A
Swedish Match AB	Sweden	19 January 2010	Production of tobacco.	75
Ta Ann Holdings Berhad	Malaysia	14 October 2013	Severe environmental damages	N/A
Textron Inc.	USA	30 January 2009	Production of components for cluster munitions.	36
Universal Corp VA	USA	19 January 2010	Production of tobacco.	3
WTK Holdings Berhad	Malaysia	14 October 2013	Severe environmental damages	N/A
Vector Group Ltd.	USA	19 January 2010	Production of tobacco.	2.1
Vedanta Resources Plc	UK	28 August 2007	Environmental and human rights abuses.	12
Volcan (mining company)	Peru	14 October 2013	Severe environmental damages	7.5
Zijin Mining	China	14 October 2013	Severe environmental damages	N/A
Zuari Agro Chemicals Ltd.	India	14 October 2013	Serious or systematic human rights violations	N/A

The fund does not announce exclusions until it has completed sales of its positions, so as not to affect the share price at the time of the transaction.

In 2016, Norges Bank decided to exclude 52 coal companies from the fund.

=== Reinstated companies ===
Several previously excluded companies have later been reinstated to the fund because the companies were no longer involved in the activities that had led to their exclusion.

Company	HQ	Date of exclusion	Reason	Divestment (Millions USD)	Date of reinstatement
ST Engineering	Singapore	26 April 2002	Design, mass production and stockpile of land mines, dual-purpose improved conventional munition (DPICM) mortar shells containing 25 bomblets, artillery shells containing 64 DPICM bomblets, air-delivered cluster bombs with 650 bomblets	N/A	30 September 2016
BAE Systems	United Kingdom	11 October 2005	Production of nuclear missiles for the French Air Force through the company MBDA.	N/A	11 January 2013
DRD Gold	South Africa	29 January 2007	Serious environmental damage.	0.6	3 September 2009
Finmeccanica	Italy	11 October 2005	Production of nuclear missiles for the French Air and Space Force through the company MBDA.	N/A	11 January 2013
FMC Corporation	USA	30 September 2011	Production of phosphate in the occupied territories of Western Sahara.	52	11 January 2013
Kerr-McGee	USA	29 April 2005	Petroleum surveying in occupied Western Sahara	54	30 June 2006
L-3 Communications	USA	30 June 2005	Production of components for cluster munitions.	N/A	31 August 2005
Thales	France	30 June 2005	Production of components for cluster munitions.	N/A	3 September 2009
United Technologies	USA	11 October 2005	Production of engines for ICBMs in the U.S. Air Force.	N/A	2 March 2013
Walmart	USA	28 March 2006	Breach of human rights and labour rights.	372	26 June 2019
Rio Tinto	United Kingdom; Australia	28 April 2008	Severe environmental damage	882	26 June 2019
Dongfeng Group	China	March 2009	Sale of military vehicles to Myanmar	N/A	Dec 2014

=== Companies "under observation" ===
As an alternative to full exclusion from the fund, companies may be placed "under observation" to help put pressure on the company to improve.

Company	HQ	Date of warning	Reason	Shares
Alstom	France	6 December 2011	Risk of gross corruption	N/A

It was proposed that one more company, Goldcorp, should be placed under similar observation. Goldcorp, as of 2019, merged with another company and no longer exists.

=== Currency portfolio ===
In October 2010 the fund spent NOK 600 million ($136.4 million as of October 2010) daily buying foreign currencies. That figure would be increased to 800 million kroner daily in November. This practice was suspended in January 2011, and on 31 January it was announced that this would also be the case in February.

== Government Pension Fund – Norway ==
The Government Pension Fund – Norway (Statens pensjonsfond Norge, SPN) was established by the National Insurance Act (Folketrygdloven) in 1967 under the name National Insurance Scheme Fund (Folketrygdfondet). The name was changed at the same time as the former Petroleum Fund, on 1 January 2006. It continues to be managed by a separate board and separate government entity, still named Folketrygdfondet. The Government Pension Fund – Norway had a value of NOK 384 billion autumn 2024. Unlike the Global division, it is required to limit its investments to companies in the Norwegian stock market, predominantly on the Oslo Stock Exchange. The Fund is not allowed to own more than a 15% interest in any single Norwegian company.

== See also ==
- Economy of Norway
- Ethical investing
- Pensions in Norway
- Sovereign wealth fund
- The budgetary rule – concerning the usage of capital gains from The Government Pension Fund – Global
