= Lorents =

Lorents is a Scandinavian masculine given name and surname. It is derived from the Latin Laurentius.

Notable people with the name include:

- Ivan Lorents (1890–1941), Polish-born Soviet diplomat
- Lorents Jensen (1863–1928), Danish sports shooter
- Lorents Lorentsen (born 1947), Norwegian civil servant
- Lorents Mørkved (1844–1924), Norwegian farmer and politician
