= Norges Bank =

Central bank of Norway

Coordinates: 59°54′31.07″N 10°44′36.66″E

Norges Bank Noregs Bank

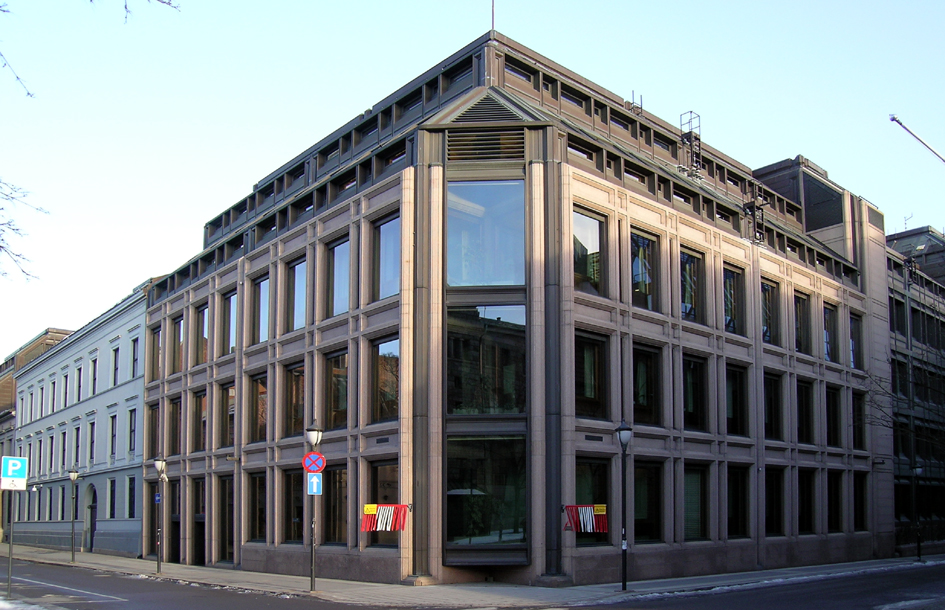
- Headquarters at Bankplassen 2
- Central bank of: Norway
- Headquarters: Oslo
- Established: 14 June 1816 (210 years ago)
- Ownership: 100% state ownership
- Governor: Ida Wolden Bache
- Currency: Norwegian krone NOK (ISO 4217)
- Reserves: 750 billion NOK (2024)
- Bank rate: 5.50%
- Interest rate target: 4.50%
- Interest on reserves: 3.50%
- Website: norges-bank.no

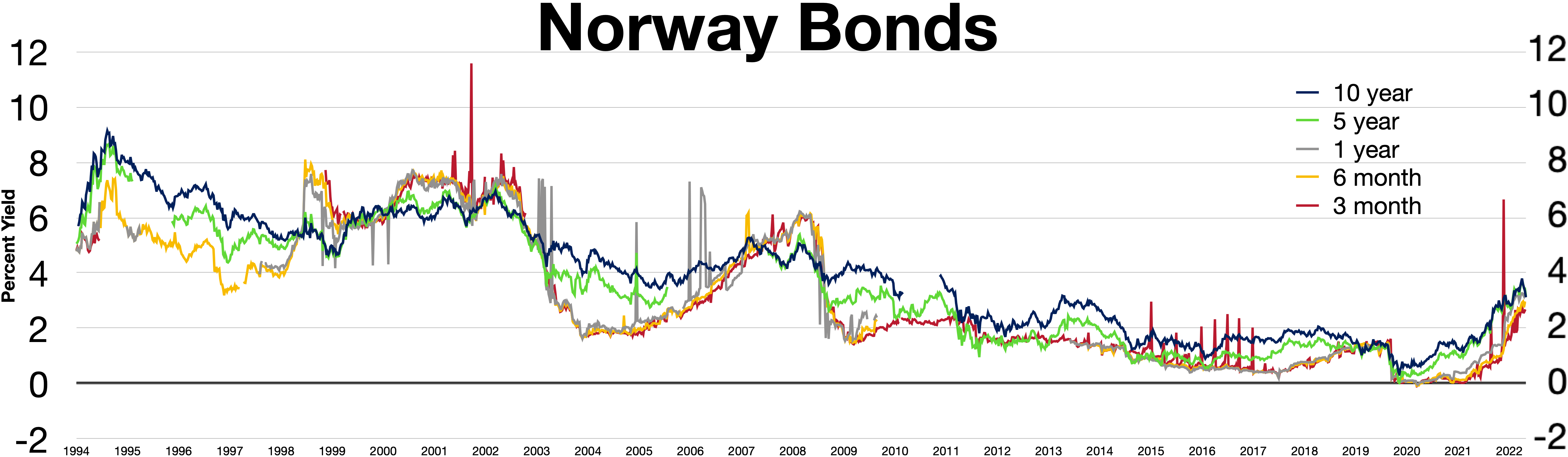
Norway bonds 10 year 5 year 1 year 6 month 3 month

Norges Bank (Bokmål: Norges Bank, Nynorsk: Noregs Bank, lit. 'Bank of Norway') is the central bank of Norway. It is responsible for managing the Government Pension Fund of Norway, which is the world's largest sovereign wealth fund, as well as the bank's own foreign exchange reserves.

== History ==
The history of the central bank of Norway can be traced back to 1816, when, two years after the separation from Denmark and the union with Sweden, Norges Bank was established by an Act of the Storting (the Norwegian parliament) on 14 June. The bank then decided that the monetary unit was to be the speciedaler (rixdollar), divided into 120 skillings or five ort ("rigsort") of 24 skillings each.

The Money Act of 17 April 1875 discontinued the terms daler and skilling, and it was decided that the monetary unit should be a krone, divided into 100 øre. This was done to prepare for Norway's entry, on 16 October that year, into the Scandinavian Monetary Union. This union had been established between Denmark and Sweden in 1873 on the recommendation of a joint commission (in which Norway participated) to establish a common Scandinavian coin based on gold. It meant that the other countries' coins were to be legal tender on the same basis as those struck at home. The union functioned until 1914; thereafter it lacked all practical significance, but was not formally abolished until 1972.

On 1 January 1897 the seat of Norges Bank was moved to Kristiania (Oslo) from Trondheim, and in 1906 a new headquarters building on Bankplassen was opened - for 80 employees including the workers in the banknote printing plant.

During the Second World War, the seat of Norges Bank was temporarily moved to London in 1940, in that the Norwegian government-in-exile established a new board. The bank's gold reserves were evacuated via Åndalsnes, Molde and Tromsø to London, and from there to New York and Ottawa. This gold and the bank's other currency reserves were under the control of the London board. At the same time, the bank continued its operations in Norway under the direction of the Nazis until the war was over and the London board stepped down. A commission of inquiry after the war concluded that the bank's Oslo management had taken a firm and correct attitude towards the Nazi authorities. In 1962, the Mint Supervisory Authority and the Royal Mint were transferred from the state to Norges Bank.

In March 2025, Norges Bank Investment Management announced that it has acquired a 49% stake in two offshore wind farms under construction in Denmark and Germany from RWE for 1.4 billion euros ($1.5 billion). The purchase includes stakes in RWE's Nordseecluster and Thor wind projects, expected to have a combined capacity of 2.64 gigawatts, enough to power over 2.6 million households. The deal reduces RWE’s net cash investments by about 4 billion euros, while RWE will continue to handle construction and operation.

Since 2024, Norges Bank Investment Management began using Claude AI to screen its portfolio for ESG risks, enabling earlier divestments and better monitoring of issues like forced labour and corruption.

== Norges Bank Investment Management ==
Norges Bank Investment Management (NBIM) is a separate branch of Norges Bank and is responsible for the management of the Government Pension Fund - Global. NBIM also manages Norges Bank's foreign exchange reserves. NBIM invests the fund's assets and the foreign exchange reserves in international equities and fixed income instruments, money market instruments and derivatives.

== List of Central Bank Governors ==
The following is a list of past and present governors of the Norges Bank. The Act of 1892 gave the board a permanent chairman. In 1985 the term Executive Board was introduced, and the chairman was entitled Governor of the Central Bank, the following people have served as chairmen and governors.

- Karl Gether Bomhoff (1893–1920)
- Nicolai Rygg (1920–1946)
- Arnold C. Ræstad (head of the London branch 1940–1945)
- Gunnar Jahn (1946–1954)
- Erik Brofoss (1954–1970)
- Knut Getz Wold (1970–1985)
- Hermod Skånland (1985–1993)
- Torstein Moland (1994–1995)
- Kjell Storvik (1996–1998)
- Svein Gjedrem (1999–2010)
- Øystein Olsen (2011–2022)
- Ida Wolden Bache (2022–present)

=== London branch ===
- Arnold C. Ræstad (head of the London branch 1940–1945)

== See also ==
- Economy of Norway
- Norwegian krone
- Gold reserves of Norway
- List of central banks
