= Trulsen =

Trulsen may refer to:

- André Trulsen (born 1965), German football coach and a former player
- Lars Nymo Trulsen (born 1976), retired Norwegian football defender
- Pål Trulsen (born 1962), Norwegian curler from Hosle in Bærum
- Trine Trulsen Vågberg (born 1962), Norwegian curler

== See also ==
- Trollåsen
- Trulben
