= Ida Wolden Bache =

Norwegian economist and banker (born 1973)

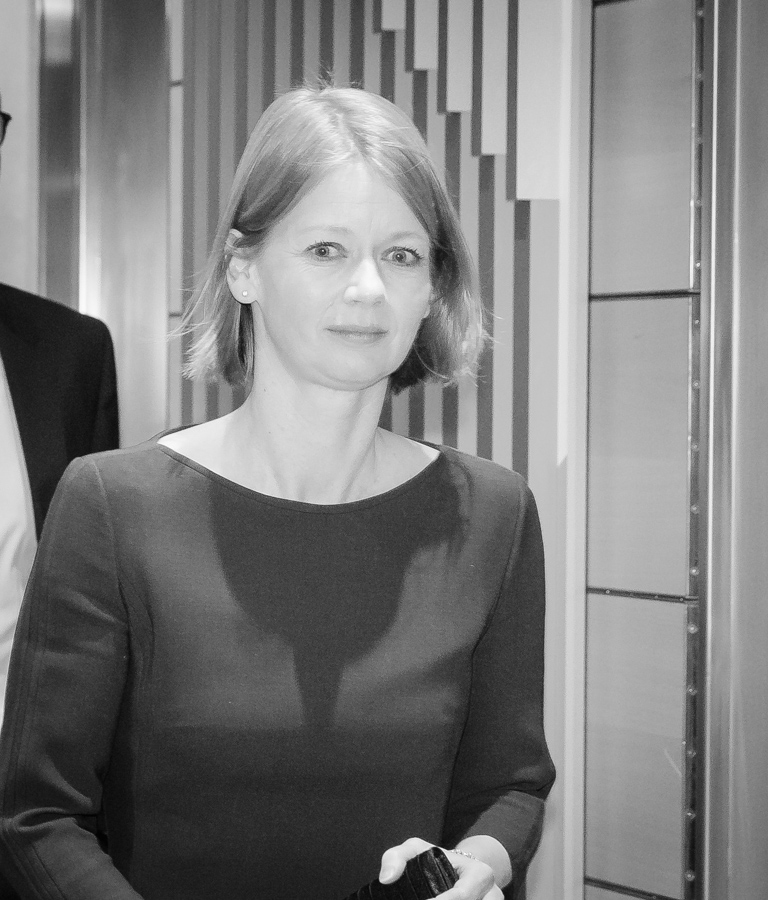
- Bache in 2018

Governor of Norges Bank
- Incumbent
- Assumed office 24 March 2022; Acting: 1 March 2022 – 24 March 2022
- Deputy: Øystein Børsum
- Preceded by: Øystein Olsen

Deputy Governor of Norges Bank
- In office 1 April 2020 – 28 February 2022
- Governor: Øystein Olsen
- Preceded by: Jon Nicolaisen
- Succeeded by: Øystein Børsum

Personal details
- Born: 26 February 1973 (age 53) Bærum, Norway
- Education: London School of Economics (MS); University of Oslo (PhD)

Ida Wolden Bache (born 26 February 1973) is a Norwegian economist who has served as the governor of Norges Bank, the Norwegian central bank, since 2022. She is the first woman to hold the position.

== Education ==
Born in Bærum, Bache graduated from Valler Upper Secondary School in 1992, before enrolling into the London School of Economics, where she graduated with a Master of Science degree in 1999. She subsequently went on to complete a PhD at the University of Oslo in 2007.

During her studies, she was a research assistant at the Department of Economics at UiO from 1996 to 1998 and a research assistant at Norges Bank from 1998 to 2000. She was employed as a consultant, adviser and senior adviser at Norges Bank from 2000 to 2009 and held a post-employment position as an associate professor in economics at BI Norwegian Business School from 2008 to 2010.

== Career ==
Bache joined Norges Bank in 1998 and worked in its research and monetary policy departments until 2010. After three years as a senior economist at Handelsbanken Capital Markets, she returned to the central bank in 2013. She ran its Financial Stability Department in 2015 and its Monetary Policy Department from 2016 to 2020.

=== Deputy Governor of Norges Bank ===
She became Deputy Governor in 2020 after her predecessor had lost his security clearance.

During her spring speech in 2021, Bache expressed her doubt that cryptocurrency would replace the Norwegian krone: "If crypto is to replace the krone, the state must also make its payments and collections in a currency other than the krone". In November, she expressed doubts about cryptocurrency, calling it a "threat": "The prevalence and scope is currently quite modest in Norway, but we point to possible channels through which cryptocurrencies can have effects on the financial system and pose a threat to the financial system in the long run".

=== Governor of Norges Bank ===
In December 2021, she applied to become the next governor of the Norwegian central bank, with Jens Stoltenberg and her seen as the most prominent candidates for the post. Controversy was caused when NRK listed only parts of her CV during a broadcast. The state broadcaster later corrected their mistake, then listing the missing parts of her CV.

To begin with, Bache did not get the position, but accepted to become the acting governor in the interim until Stoltenberg had finished his tenure as Secretary General of NATO. However, on 24 March, following a NATO summit about the Russian invasion of Ukraine, Stoltenberg announced that he would continue as NATO Secretary-General for another year and that he would resign as the incoming governor. Bache was then nominated to fill the term that Stoltenberg was meant to take on. She was formally appointed to the position on 1 April at the Council of State.

The same day as her appointment, Bache announced that Norges Bank would raise interest rates, stating: "As we now assess the outlook and the risk picture, the key policy rate will most likely be raised further in June".

In November 2023 she asked Norwegian government to be able to invest in private equity, obtaining no formal response so far from it.

== Other activities ==
- International Monetary Fund (IMF), Ex-Officio Member of the Board of Governors (since 2022)
