= Torstein Moland =

Norwegian economist

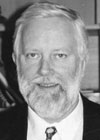

Governor of the Central Bank of Norway
- In office 1994–1995

State Secretary
- In office 1986–1989

Personal details
- Born: 4 November 1945 (age 80)
- Occupation: economist

Torstein Moland (born 4 November 1945) is a Norwegian economist.

From 1986 to 1989, during the second cabinet Brundtland, Moland was a state secretary in the Office of the Prime Minister.

He was then CEO of Norske Skog from 1990 to 1993, and was appointed Governor of the Central Bank of Norway in 1994. He was pressured to resign already in 1995 following the Airbus scandal. Instead, he was hired in Telenor.

Government offices
Preceded by Hermod Skånland	Central Bank Governor of Norway; 1993–1995	Succeeded by Kjell Storvik
