= Eivind Erichsen =

Norwegian economist and civil servant (1917–2005)

- Born: 28 January 1917
- Died: 21 January 2005 (aged 87)
- Occupation: Economist

Eivind Erichsen (28 January 1917 – 21 January 2005) was a Norwegian economist and civil servant.

== Life and career ==
He was born in Kristiania as a son of postmaster Erik Emanuel Erichsen (1884–1963) and Petra Antoine Olsen (1885–1930). In May 1944 he married Ingrid Holmboe. She was a great-grandniece of Bernt Michael and Christopher Andreas Holmboe. The couple had two children.

Erichsen graduated from the University of Oslo in 1943 with the cand.oecon. degree. This was during the occupation of Norway by Nazi Germany, and he was imprisoned in Bredtveit concentration camp from 15 October 1943, then in Berg concentration camp from 29 October 1943 to 16 April 1944. He then worked in Statistics Norway to 1945, in the United States from 1945 to 1947 and as a consultant in the Ministry of Finance and Customs in 1947. In 1948 he succeeded Trygve Haavelmo as a subdirector in the Ministry of Trade. In 1951 the idea of appointing Erichsen as a State Secretary in the Ministry of Finance was discussed, but it did not happen. In 1952 Erichsen was promoted to deputy under-secretary of state in the Ministry of Finance. Following a stint as a director in the Organisation for European Economic Co-operation from 1956 to 1957, he returned to Norway to serve as permanent under-secretary of State of the Ministry of Finance from 1957 to 1986. He edged out the other applicants, Einar Grøstad and Sigurd Lorentzen, partly due to him being an economist and the other two being jurists. He had another leave of absence from 1967 to 1968, when he worked with planning in Pakistan.

He also chaired Statens Friluftsråd from 1965 to 1982. A festschrift was issued on his seventieth birthday, and in 1999 Erichsen released the retrospective Glimt fra et langt liv i Finansdepartementet. He died in January 2005 in Oslo. He was decorated as a Commander with Star of the Order of St. Olav in 1982.

Civic offices
Preceded by Friedrich Georg Nissen	Permanent under-secretary of state in the Ministry of Finance; 1957–1986	Succeeded by Tormod Hermansen
