= Sigurd Lorentzen =

Sigurd Juell Lorentzen (5 August 1916 – 25 January 1979) was a Norwegian judge and civil servant.

He was born in Sunndal Municipality, and was a brother of professor Gustav Fredrik Lorentzen. He married judge Lelia Marie Loe in 1957. They resided in Bærum Municipality.

He enrolled as a student in 1934, graduated with the cand.jur. degree in 1938, and worked as a secretary in Trustkontrollkontoret from 1939 to 1940 and in the Norwegian Price Directorate from 1940 to 1945. After a brief time in the Ministry of Finance in 1945, to which he was summoned by Wilhelm Thagaard, he returned to the Price Directorate and remained here until 1949. He was a deputy under-secretary of state in the Ministry of Finance from 1951 to 1960, permanent under-secretary of state in the Ministry of Transport from 1960 to 1972 and a Supreme Court Justice from 1972 to 1979.

When hired as deputy under-secretary in 1951, Lorentzen edged out applicants who were generally believed to be better qualified, especially Einar Grøstad. This was a personal decision by Minister of Finance Trygve Bratteli. Lorentzen was the youngest of the applicants, and the second youngest permanent under-secretary in the Ministry at the time. He was also known to be, as a person, quite similar to Trygve Bratteli. He became quite strong; historian Einar Lie has noted that "in reality", the permanent under-secretary of state Friedrich Georg Nissen did not function "as a real superior to Lorentzen". In 1957, both Grøstad and Lorentzen applied to become the successor of Nissen as permanent under-secretary, the highest position in the Ministry. However, this time Trygve Bratteli chose economist Eivind Erichsen; Grøstad and Lorentzen were both jurists. Einar Lie has called this "likely [...] the only defeat in Lorentzen's own career". Soon, Lorentzen developed a reserved relation to Erichsen as well as Per Kleppe—principally, though, since the latter two were economists and Lorentzen was a jurist. Einar Lie wrote that when Trygve Bratteli brought Lorentzen to the Ministry of Transport, he "solved" a problem. It also paved the way for up-and-coming economist Hermod Skånland.

Lorentzen was also the chairman of the Norwegian Association of Lawyers from 1966 to 1971 and the Norwegian State Educational Loan Fund.
