= Kjell Storvik =

Norwegian economist

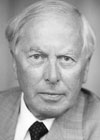

Governor of the Central Bank of Norway
- In office 1995–1998

State Secretary
- In office 1981–1985

Personal details
- Born: 20 November 1930 (age 95)
- Occupation: economist

Kjell Storvik (born 20 November 1930) is a Norwegian economist and former Governor of the Central Bank of Norway.

He is a cand.oecon. by education. From 1977 to 1981 he was the vice president of the Norwegian Shipowners' Association. He was then State Secretary in the Ministry of Finance for four years. He was appointed Vice Governor of the Central Bank of Norway. When Governor Torstein Moland was forced to resign, Storvik became acting Governor, only to get the job permanently the next year.

Government offices
Preceded by Torstein Moland	Central Bank Governor of Norway; 1995–1998 (acting from 1995–1996)	Succeeded by Svein Gjedrem
