= Pensions in Norway =

Pensions in Norway fall into three major divisions; State Pensions, Occupational Pensions and Individual or personal Pensions.

== State pensions (Alderspensjon) ==
All Norwegians citizens are entitled to get a state pension from the age of 67 in accordance with the Norwegian National Insurance Act (Folketrygdloven). The state pension is paid in full to Norwegian citizens who have lived in Norway for at least 40 years after the age of 16 and in lesser amounts to Norwegian citizens who have lived less time in the country (see Minimal state pension (Minstepensjon)).

The State Pension is calculated according to what the individual has previously earned from ages 16 to 67. The calculation is made by The Norwegian Labour and Welfare Administration (NAV).

The financing of the state pensions is based on a "Pay as you go" system. This means that today's work force is making the payments for the current retirees. The demographic structure in Norway suggests that in the future there will gradually be significantly fewer persons working in proportion to each retired pensioner.

The state pension is divided into three different parts, Public pension base rate (which everyone gets), Special supplement and Dependents supplement. Altogether this makes up the state pension scheme.

- Public pension base rate (called "Grunnpensjon" or "G") - a base rate used as the basis for calculating the Norwegian state pension. The Public pension base rate is adjusted annually and is approved each year by the Norwegian parliament on the basis of the negotiations made in the annual insurance settlement. As of May 1, 2014, the amount of the Public pension base rate was 88,730 NOK per year.
- Special supplement (called "Særtillegg") - is given to retirees who have earned little or no additional pension in the National Insurance pension scheme. If the individual has managed to earn an additional pension which is at least as large as the special supplement, they would not be able to get the special supplement. If the additional pension scheme is less than the special supplement, the difference between the two is paid in the special supplement. The size of the special supplement will depend on whether the pensioner is single, has a spouse/partner/partner who is also receiving a pension, or if they are the breadwinner of the household. If the individual provides for a spouse who is over 60 years old, they would get the highest special supplement.
- Dependents supplement (called "Forsørgingstillegg") - is given to retirees who support a spouse with no income and/or children under the age of 18.

=== Minimal state pension (Minstepensjon) ===
The Minimal state pension is a pension scheme which is paid to retirees who have not earned a special supplement (Særtillegg) or who have earned an Occupational pensions which is lower than the State Pension special supplement.

The minimal state pension provision is intended to prevent poverty in old age. All Norwegian citizens over the age of 67 are entitled to claim state pension, including Norwegian citizens who have never accrued pension, or those who have accrued a low pension.

Living costs in Norway are very high and have been increasing tremendously over the past few decades. Therefore, the Norwegian minimal state pension, which has been designed to cover the most basic living expenses in Norway, is adjusted each year to the increasing living costs in Norway.

Norwegian pensioners who have lived most of their lives in Norway and who are entitled the Norwegian minimal state pension are permitted to use this pension money in other countries too – due to this, many Norwegian retirees choose eventually to move abroad after they retire to countries where the Norwegian minimal state pension would provide them a much higher standard of living. On the other hand, Norwegian pensioners who did not live in Norway most of their lives and who are entitled the Norwegian minimal state pension, will receive the Norwegian minimal state pension only if they would stay in Norway for at least nine months each year from the age of 67.

For example, as of 2013 basic factor for single person, calculated is 14208 kr per month (half of that is Basic pension-Grunnpensjon and rest Special supplement-Særtillegg) which is about US$2,326, 1,429 GBP or 1,689 EUR per month. To compare - a Spain which is because of the climate, proximity, union part often chosen by pensioners, have average Spanish worker earns of €1,615 per month, and minimal wage of €752.9.

== Occupational pensions (Tjenestepensjon) ==
Occupational pension schemes are arrangements established by employers to provide pension and related benefits for their employees.

From 2006, all employers in Norway are required to provide an occupational pension (see mandatory occupational pensions section below) for their employees.

=== Mandatory occupational pensions (Obligatorisk tjenestepensjon) ===
The mandatory occupational pensions (called "Obligatorisk tjenestepensjon" or OTP in Norwegian) were initially introduced in 2007 to cover employees who were not already covered by pension schemes. Many Norwegian workers have no other plan in store than the state pension scheme of the National Insurance. In order to change this, the OTP pension scheme was introduced. It is up to the individual companies to decide if they would rather choose a contribution scheme or a scheme based on the putting part of the employee's salary aside for them to have at retirement. The premium and the pension costs for the OTP pension scheme are paid in full by the employer. The minimum contribution is 2% of the salary funds. The employee can contribute, but this is voluntary. The pension scheme must be the same for everyone in the company who has an income of above 1G. It is not legally required for employees with an income of over 12G.

=== Contractual pension (Avtalefestet pensjon) ===
Contractual pension (called "Avtalefestet pensjon" or "AFP") is an early retirement pension scheme given to employees of companies which participate in the AFP pension scheme through a collective agreement (overenskomst).

The scheme was initially introduced in 1988 when the Norwegian Confederation of Trade Unions (LO) and the Confederation of Norwegian Enterprise (NHO) reached an agreement according to which the employees would be able to get their pension from the age of 66 years. According to the initial arrangement, the employees which took part in this pension scheme were entitled to receive an early retirement at the age of 66 if they wanted it. Later, the LO and the NHO negotiated on a lower retirement age. This pension scheme retirement age is currently 62. Eighty percent of today's 62-year-olds in Norway are entitled to get this pension scheme. Initially this pension scheme was only meant for those who were working in the hard industrial jobs, but eventually more groups became involved as other trade unions and employers' organizations also joined this pension scheme. The state has gradually joined this scheme.

This pension scheme is received in addition to the state pension scheme.

== Individual or personal pensions ==
It is also possible for an individual to make contributions under an arrangement they themselves make with a provider (such as an insurance company). Contributions are typically invested during an individual's working life, and then used to purchase a pension at or following retirement.

== Historical pension arrangements ==
=== Pension Insurance for Seamen (Pensjonstrygden for sjømenn) ===
The seamen pension arrangement (called “Pensjonstrygden for sjømenn” in Norwegian) was established as a mandatory pension scheme by law on 3 December 1948, and its primary aim was to provide the pension for retired seamen, or their widows. Today it mainly covers retired seamen pensions between the ages 60 and 67. It is financed by fees taken from seafarers and shipping companies and by grants given by the state.

This pension arrangement covers:

- Seafarers who are Norwegian citizens.
- Seafarers with permanent residence in Norway.
- From 1994 the pension scheme covers also seamen who are nationals of other EU/EEA countries.

Seafarer in this context includes some personnel in offshore- related industries, some rescue personnel at sea, and some groups of personnel on cruise- ships.

=== Public Service Pension Fund (Statens pensjonskasse) ===
Public sector employees are covered by the Norwegian Public Service Pension Fund (called "Statens pensjonskasse" in Norwegian) .

== The New Pension Reform ==
The Norwegian pension reform was initially announced in 2001 when the government appointed a special pensions commission. The commission which was led by Sigbjørn Johnsen consisted of both politicians and independent experts. The Parliament of Norway adopted the new regulations in the spring of 2009. The reform is scheduled for completion and would be fully implemented in 2025. The new regulations of the new "Flexible Retirement Act" (Ny fleksibel alderspensjon) have been implemented gradually since 2010. The reason for introducing new regulations in the retirement plans schemes was to be able to maintain a sustainable pension system which would be capable of handling an increase in the number of retired Norwegians/higher life expectancy, while at the same time fewer children are born. The pension reform is therefore intended to encourage more people to stay for a longer period in the workforce after retirement age.

As forecasted by the United Nations (UN), the Norwegian population over 65 years of age will reach a share of 25% of the country's population by 2060, contrasting a 16% figure in 2015. In adherence to this assumption and if there had not been an effective reform to the National Insurance Scheme in Norway, government expenditure for old age pensions would have amounted to 13% of GDP by 2060, which is more than double what was spent in 2013 (6% of GDP).

Norway's pension reform has enjoyed widespread public support as its objective to improve the sustainability of the pensions system in the long-run has derived in strong labor supply incentives to get citizens to work more and for a longer period while keeping essential features of the re-distributive nature of the old scheme intact. The reform is to be implemented gradually, but some key features were already put into practice in 2011, including: life expectancy adjustment of pensions, flexible retirement from age 62 according to actuarial principles, and new rules for pension indexation.

The new system incorporates some of the old system's characteristics, such as:

- Components based on minimum guarantee and previous earnings.
- The minimum guarantee level is kept at the same level of married and unmarried pensioners –33% of the average full-time salary for unmarried people and 31% for unmarried pensioners. It must be added that the minimum guarantee is not taxed.
- Residence requirements from the old scheme still apply in the current system: 3 years for some guarantee pension and 40 years for full guarantee.
- Old-age expenditure will still rely on a pay-as-you-go system through a mix of general tax revenue and social security contributions.

While bringing in new attributes like:

- A notional defined contribution (NDC) model for the accumulation of pension entitlements: entitlements now arise from income from work or special periods or circumstances from age 13 until 75. In this way, the reform cleared the previous maximum 40-year-period of registered income for eligibility to a full pension. Now, working for more than 40 years can yield more benefits.
- Flexible retirement between ages 62 and 75 according to actuarial principles –before the reform, the earliest pensionable age was 67, and now it has been replaced by flexible access from 62 years of age, when citizens can partially withdraw a percentage (20%, 40%, 50%, 60% or 80%) of their full pension. Moreover, the continuation of work after starting to withdraw furnishes additional pension entitlements, providing incentives for people to work for more years.
- Changes in life expectancy adjustment of pensions. The previous calculation of earnings-related pensions has been transformed, especially when it comes to the implicit “pension wealth of accumulated entitlements” being converted to an “annuity over the expected remaining lifetime”, which is done by assessing annuity conversion factors between ages of 62 and 75 for each eligible group sharing similar features when they hit 61 years of age –these factors are set and will not be subjected to adjustments later on, which is subject to some critique by experts.
- New rules of indexation of pensions. During the accumulation phase, entitlements are indexed to wage growth; at retirement, the income pension is indexed to annual salary growth less 0.75 percentage points, meaning that the earnings-related pension is linked to an average rise in wages and increased prices in consumption (inflation).
- The new scheme has tempered the income test applied to the minimum guarantee against the earnings-related counterpart by reducing the withdrawal rate from 100% to 80% –this was done with the intention of fortifying the correlation between labor income and the old-age pension, providing work incentives to different sectors of society.

While most countries reforming their national security systems rely on policy measures such as increasing the access-to-pension age, Norway has installed a scheme in which there is a reduction of the access age (from 67 to 62) accompanied by a flexible retirement from 62 to 75 and life expectancy adjustments, lowering pensions as life expectancy rises –this incentivizes people to work for more years to reduce the impact of growing life expectancy in a scheme that conversely relates it to pension benefits. Nevertheless, and while the reform has been widely praised, there are some shortcomings pointed out by experts: the reformed system is complex and has no automatic mechanisms to adjust to future macroeconomic or demographic pressures, and it establishes a uniform annuity-conversion-factors-assessment that does not take into account the possible negative effects on groups with shorter life expectancy.

== See also ==
- Pension
- Government Pension Fund of Norway
- Economy of Norway
