= Svein Gjedrem =

Norwegian economist (born 1950)

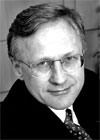

Governor of the Central Bank of Norway
- In office 1999–2010

Personal details
- Born: 25 January 1950 (age 76) Finnøy Municipality
- Occupation: economist

Svein Ingvar Gjedrem (born 25 January 1950 in Finnøy Municipality) is a Norwegian economist and former Governor of the Central Bank of Norway.

He graduated in political economy from the University of Oslo in 1975, worked as a consultant in the Central Bank of Norway from 1975 to 1979 and in the Ministry of Finance from 1979 to 1998. He served two terms as Central Bank Governor from 1 January 1999. In June 2011, Gjedrem got his position as permanent under-secretary of the Ministry of Finance back. He remained here until 2015.

In the late 1960s and early 1970s Gjedrem played football for Viking and Lyn.

Gjedrem’s successor as Governor of the Central Bank of Norway was Øystein Olsen who was appointed in October 2010 and took over on 1 January 2011.

Gjedrem has accepted a part-time position at the Norwegian School of Economics and Business Administration, and started teaching in 2011.

Political offices
Preceded by Arne Øien	Permanent under-secretary of state in the Ministry of Finance; 1996–1998	Succeeded by Tore Eriksen
Preceded by Tore Eriksen	Permanent under-secretary of state in the Ministry of Finance; 2011–2015	Succeeded by Hans Henrik Scheel
Government offices
Preceded by Kjell Storvik	Central Bank Governor of Norway; 1999–2010	Succeeded by Øystein Olsen
