= Karl Gether Bomhoff =

Norwegian politician

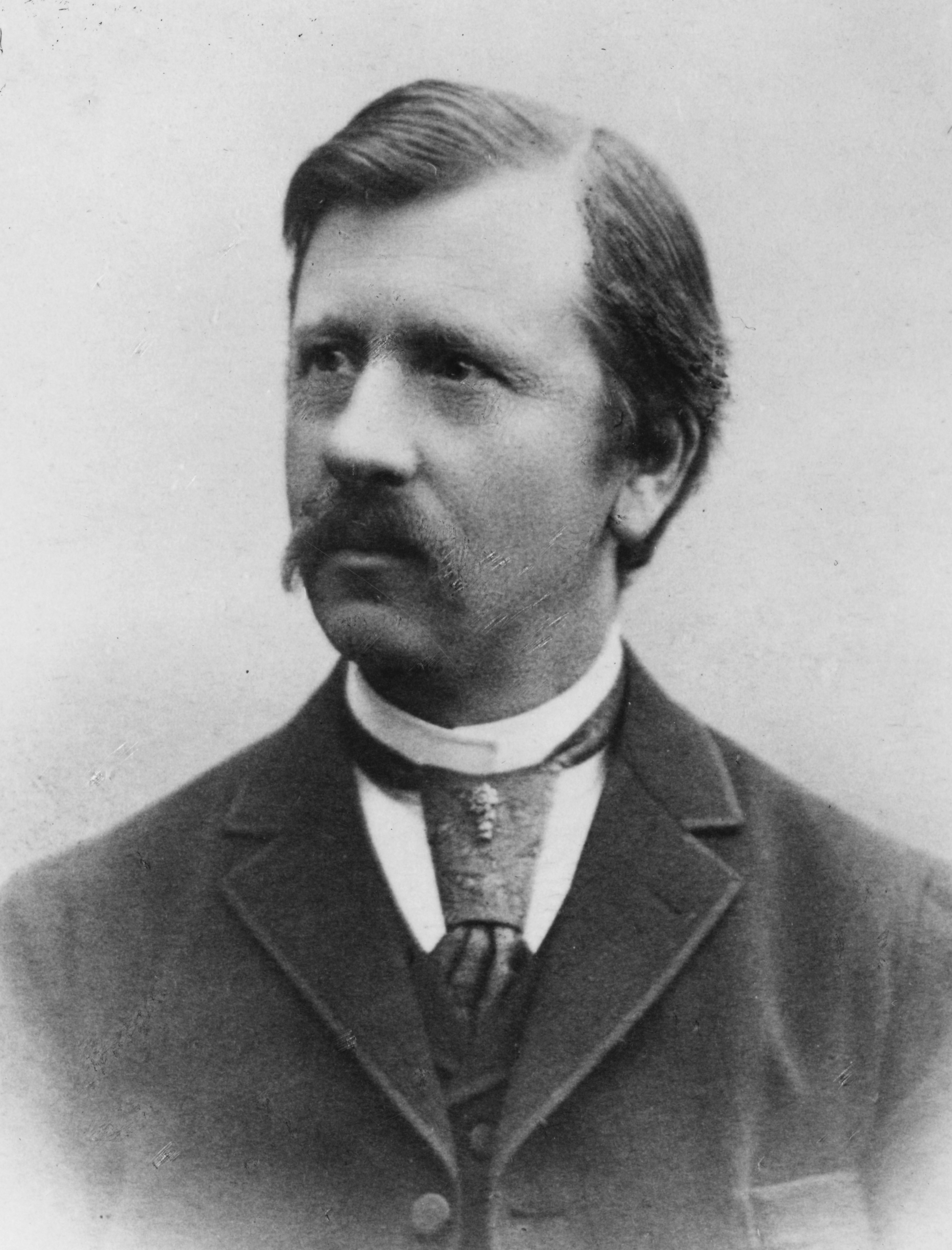
- Born: 6 August 1842; Larvik, Norway
- Died: 23 September 1925 (aged 83)
- Occupations: Pharmacist; Banker; Politician
- Known for: Governor of the Central Bank of Norway

Karl Gether Bomhoff (6 August 1842 –23 September 1925) was a Norwegian pharmacist, politician and governor of the Central Bank of Norway.

== Biography ==
He was born in Larvik. He graduated as pharmacist in 1863 in Drammen and Trondheim, followed by a period as chemist in Dresden, Germany. He was managing director of Trondhjems mekaniske Værksted between 1875 and 1878. In 1883 was elected to the Trondheim city council. In 1884 was elected to the board of Norges Bank, which at this time had its head office in Trondheim. He served as the first governor of the Norges Bank from 1893 to 1920. He was elected representative to the Storting for the period 1895–1897, from the Liberal Party.

Government offices
Preceded by position created	Central Bank Governor of Norway; 1893–1920	Succeeded by Nicolai Rygg
