= Øystein Olsen (economist) =

Norwegian public servant

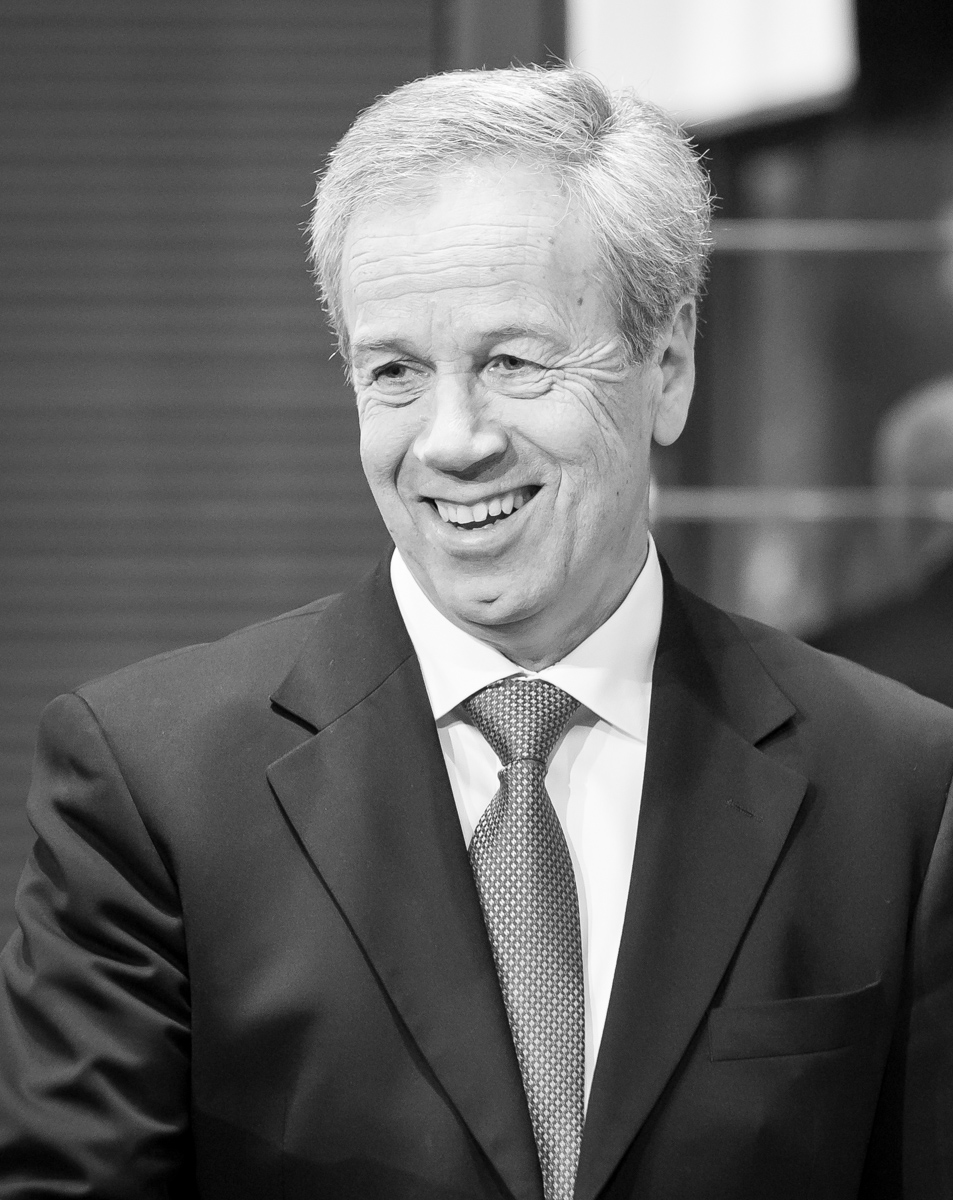

Governor of the Central Bank of Norway
- In office 1 January 2011 – 28 February 2022
- Deputy: Jon Nicolaisen; Ida Wolden Bache
- Preceded by: Svein Gjedrem
- Succeeded by: Ida Wolden Bache

Personal details
- Born: 8 January 1952 (age 74)
- Occupation: Public servant Economist

Øystein Olsen (born 8 January 1952) is a Norwegian public servant who served as Governor of the Central Bank of Norway from 2011 to 2022.

== Career ==
Olsen is cand.oecon. from the University of Oslo in 1977

Olsen came to the Central Bank governor position from his previous rank as Managing Director of Statistics Norway (SSB). He took on this position from 1 January 2005, succeeding Svein Longva. The SSB position is a fixed term of six years. He has also previously worked in SSB as researcher, senior researcher, and head of the Oil and energy group from 1977 to 1990. After a year in ECON, Center for Economic Analysis, Olsen returned to the SSB as research director in the years 1991 to 1994. From 1996 to 1999 he was appointed as research director and head of the research department in the same place. From 1999 until he became director of the SSB, he was deputy secretary in the Economics Department of the Norwegian Ministry of Finance.

From 1993 to 1998 Olsen was professor II at Norwegian School of Management.

In August 2021, he announced his intention to step down after his 12th annual speech in February 2022, about a year before his term as governor was meant to end. Olsen stated that he thought the timing was acceptable due to him turning 70 in January.

== Other activities ==
- International Monetary Fund (IMF), Ex-Officio Member of the Board of Governors
- University of Oslo, Member of the Board

Government offices
Preceded by Svein Gjedrem	Central Bank Governor of Norway; 2011–2022	Succeeded by Ida Wolden Bache
