= Klara Berg =

Norwegian politician

Klara Berg (6 March 1925 – 2 March 2011) was a Norwegian politician for the Christian Democratic Party.

Berg was born in Eldalen in March 1925. She served as a deputy representative to the Norwegian Parliament from Sogn og Fjordane during the terms 1981–1985 and 1985–1989. Berg was also a member of the municipal council of Gaular Municipality from 1967 to 1991, and a member of Sogn og Fjordane county council.

Her sister Magny Bell Fossen was also a politician, but represented the Centre Party.
