= Truls Glesne =

Norwegian economist and civil servant

Truls Glesne (8 April 1916 – 28 August 1971) was a Norwegian economist and civil servant.

He graduated from the University of Oslo with the cand.oecon. degree in 1940. He worked as a secretary in the Ministry of Provisioning from 1941 to 1942, and spent the rest of the World War II years in the company G. C. Rieber. He was a consultant in the Norwegian Price Directorate from 1945 to 1946, in the Ministry of Justice from 1946 to 1948 and in the Ministry of Trade from 1948 to 1952. In 1952 he was hired in the Ministry of Finance, first as assistant secretary. He was promoted to deputy under-secretary of state in 1958, and remained so until 1970, except for a brief time in 1967 when he was acting permanent under-secretary of state. He was deputy under-secretary in two different offices; Økonomiavdelingen from 1958 to 1960 and Finansavdelingen from 1960 to 1970. He was moved because the latter office needed a successor for Sigurd Lorentzen.
