= 1925 Norwegian local elections =

Municipality elections were held in Norway in 1925.

== Result of municipal elections ==
Results of the 1925 municipal elections. Results can only be given separately by rural areas and cities.

=== Cities ===
| Party | Votes | % |
|---|---|---|
| Conservative Party–Free-minded Liberal Party | | 38.9 |
| Labour Party | | 27.5 |
| Social Democratic Labour Party | | 10.7 |
| Liberal Party | | 6.8 |
| Communist Party | | 5.9 |
| Temperance Party | | 5.0 |
| Others | | 5.2 |
| Total | | |

=== Rural areas ===
| Party | Votes | % |
|---|---|---|
| Labour Party | | 19.1 |
| Farmers' Party | | 15.0 |
| Liberal Party | | 9.4 |
| Social Democratic Labour Party | | 7.2 |
| Conservative Party–Free-minded Liberal Party | | 6.7 |
| Communist Party | | 2.8 |
| Radical People's Party | | 1.7 |
| Riksmål Party | | 0.3 |
| Temperance Party | | 0.2 |
| Joint lists and others | | 37.4 |
| Total | | |
