= Anne-Olaug Ingeborgrud =

Norwegian politician

Anne-Olaug Ingeborgrud (28 April 1925 in Nes – 17 March 2003) was a Norwegian politician for the Christian Democratic Party.

She was elected to the Norwegian Parliament from Akershus in 1977, but was not re-elected in 1981. She had previously served as a deputy representative during the term 1973–1977. From 1983 to 1985, during the second cabinet Willoch, she was appointed State Secretary in the Ministry of Church and Education.

On the local level she was a member of Nes municipal council from 1959 to 1971. She served as vice leader of the national party from 1985 to 1987.

Outside politics she worked as a high school teacher.
