= The budgetary rule =

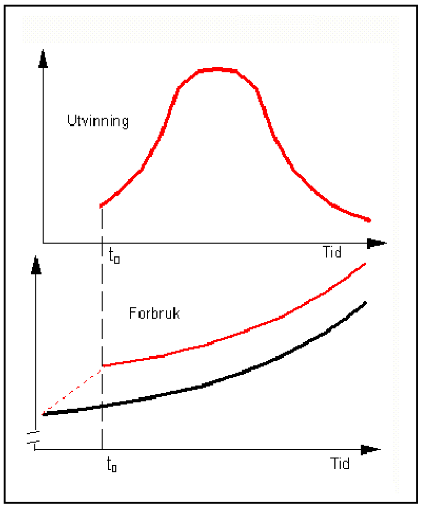
Drawing showing oil income versus how it is used under the budgetary rule

The budgetary rule (Norwegian: handlingsregelen) is a rule concerning the usage of capital gains from The Government Pension Fund - Global of Norway. The rule states that a maximum of 3% of the fund's value should be allocated to the yearly government budget. Its main stated justification is to avoid the Dutch disease in the Norwegian economy due to the large influx of oil-sourced revenue. It is believed that the fund will grow with more than 3% yearly over time, which makes it possible to allocate up to 3% to the yearly budget without decreasing the value of the fund.

The rule was introduced in 2001 during the First cabinet Stoltenberg, and has a broad cross-party support.

The rule was last changed from 4% to 3% February 2017. Every party in the parliament was in favour of the change, except the right wing Progress Party (Norway).

== Purpose and economic rationale ==
The budgetary rule is intended to ensure prudent, long-term management of Norway’s petroleum revenues by limiting the transfer of funds from the Government Pension Fund Global to the national budget. By keeping spending in line with the expected real return of the fund, the rule aims to preserve capital for future generations and avoid exposing the economy to excessive fiscal volatility caused by fluctuating oil prices.

Norges Bank Investment Management, which manages the Government Pension Fund Global, states that the fiscal rule is designed to support sustainable public finances by allowing gradual use of petroleum wealth while maintaining the fund’s real value. This approach also helps reduce the risk of macroeconomic instability and the negative effects associated with large, volatile inflows from oil and gas production on the broader economy.

== See also ==
- Golden Rule (fiscal policy)
