= Haakon Bjørklid =

Norwegian writer, painter and illustrator (1925–2020)

- Born: 30 May 1925; Oslo, Norway
- Died: 27 January 2020 (aged 94); Oslo
- Occupations: Illustrator, painter, animator and printmaker

Haakon Bjørklid (30 May 1925 – 27 January 2020) was a Norwegian illustrator, painter, animator and printmaker.

== Career ==
Born in Oslo, Bjørklid studied at the Norwegian National Academy of Craft and Art Industry from 1945 to 1949, and further at the Norwegian National Academy of Fine Arts under the supervision of Per Krohg and Jean Heiberg from 1953 to 1955.

Bjørklid made his debut in 1969 with the picture book Den store blå bukken, with texts based on Norwegian fairytales retold in rhymes. Further similar books are Mons Matglad (1972), Hanen og høna (1977) and Mannen som skulle stelle hjemme (1982). In a treatment of pictures in children's books, Tordis Ørjasæter says that Bjørklid's illustrations bear inspiration from Norwegian folklore art. His animals are exaggerated, similar to a child's fantasy. The colors are intense, and figures seem to step directly out of the fairytale. His picture books earned him the Picture book prize from the Ministry of Culture in 1969 and 1973.

As painter, he is represented with works in the National Gallery of Norway.

He also created animation films for NRK television.

Bjørklid died in Oslo in January 2020.
