= Astri Riddervold =

Norwegian ethnologist and cook (1925–2019)

- Born: 8 August 1925; Haugesund, Norway
- Died: 17 March 2019 (aged 93); Oslo
- Education: Chemist and ethnologist
- Occupations: Educator and writer

Astri Riddervold (8 August 1925 − 17 March 2019) was a Norwegian chemist and ethnologist, educator, cook and writer. She is particularly known for her dissemination of food culture and food traditions. Her speciality was ancient food preservation. Riddervold was born in Haugesund, and was educated in both chemistry and ethnology. She was awarded Ingrid Espelid Hovigs matkulturpris in 1995.

== Selected publications ==
- Riddervold, Astri (1978). Konserveringsmetoder for kjøtt, fisk, ville bær og urter i førindustrielt norsk bondehold: en analyse fra Skjerstad i Salten, Nordland. (Thesis).
- Riddervold, Astri (1990). Lutefisk, Rakefisk and Herring in Norwegian Tradition.
- Riddervold, Astri (1993). Konservering av mat.
- Riddervold, Astri (1996). Innenfor fellesskapet.
- Riddervold, Astri (1997). Drikkeskikker.
- Riddervold; Berg; et al. (2004). Spekemat.
- Riddervold; Heuch (2011). Rakefisk.
- Nordjore; Riddervold (2016). Kvinnerolla og matkulturen.
