= Arne Brun Lie =

Norwegian-American author (1925–2010)

- Born: 2 February 1925; Oslo, Norway
- Died: 11 April 2010 (aged 85); Beverly, Massachusetts, US
- Occupation: Author
- Known for: Night and Fog: A Survivor's Story

Arne Brun Lie (2 February 1925 – 11 April 2010) was a Norwegian-American author and Holocaust survivor best known for the book Night and Fog: A Survivor's Story (1990).

Born in Oslo, Norway, Lie was a member of the Resistance during the Nazi occupation. He was captured by the Gestapo in 1943 at sixteen years of age. He spent a year in concentration camps, including Natzweiler-Struthof and Dachau, and was released in 1944.

Lie immigrated to the United States in the early 1980s and became vocal about his Holocaust experience, publishing a book and releasing a documentary film.

He was the brother of Sylvei Brun Lie, wife of the lawyer, judge, and politician Jens Evensen.

Arne died on 11 April 2010 in Beverly, Massachusetts, at the age of 85.

== Selected works ==
- Night and Fog (with Robby Robinson, W.W. Norton & Co. 1990)
- Passage (The New Film Company, Inc. 1991)
