= Pyxus International =

American international storage and distribution company

Pyxus International, Inc.
- Company type: Public
- Traded as: OTC Pink Current: PYYX
- Industry: Tobacco wholesale and distribution; cannabis and hemp production
- Genre: Consumer goods
- Founded: 2005; 21 years ago
- Headquarters: Morrisville, North Carolina, US
- Revenue: $1.6 billion (2022)
- Number of employees: 3,330
- Website: www.pyxusintl.com

Pyxus International, Inc. is an international storage, sales, distribution company and is a publicly held independent leaf tobacco merchant. The company generates revenue primarily by selling leaf tobacco and relevant processing fees charged from tobacco manufacturers worldwide. As of 2014, the company’s enterprise value is $1.27 billion. The company operates more than 50 manufacturing facilities worldwide. Its customer base include tobacco manufacturers in United Kingdom, Japan, China, U.S., Southeast of Asia region and elsewhere.

== History ==
Alliance One International was established in 2005, as a result of the corporate merger between Dimon Incorporated and Standard Commercial Corporation. The company changed its name to Pyxus International in 2018.

Dimon was founded in 1995, and later in 1997 it acquired Intabex Holdings Worldwide, which was the world's fourth-largest leaf merchant at the time. The company’s acquisition of Intabex was considered as the biggest one of that kind in the leaf history.

Standard Commercial Corporation, established in 1910, operated tobacco leaf business in Mediterranean area. It was the third-largest leaf merchant of the world prior to the merger with Dimon.

On June 15, 2020, Pyxus International Inc. filed for chapter 11 bankruptcy. The company's debtors emerged from bankruptcy on August 24, 2020.

== Operations ==
In December 2013, the company announced the expiration of its offer to exchange up to $735 million of 9.875% Senior Secured Second Lien Notes due 2021.

On February 8, 2018, the company announced investments in two Canadian cannabis growers and a United States-based hemp producer.

== Bribery and internal controls violations ==
In 2010 Alliance One pleaded guilty to paying bribes to government officials, as well as ancillary violations of the U.S. Foreign Corrupt Practices Act (FCPA), through two foreign subsidiaries of the predecessor firms before the merger. Alliance One agreed to pay criminal penalties totaling $9.5 million and to retain independent monitors for a period of three years, and simultaneously settled a parallel civil complaint filed by the U.S. Securities and Exchange Commission (SEC), disgorging $10 million in profits. The civil case additionally included internal controls violations.

=== Thailand ===
Thai sales agents employed by Dimon and Standard subsidiaries based in Switzerland and Brazil, respectively, had paid bribes totaling $1.9 million to officials of the Tobacco Authority of Thailand in order to secure sales contracts. The bribes had been coordinated among Dimon, Standard and a third competitor, Universal Corporation. The illicit payments flowed from 2000 to 2004, at which point the corporation

=== Kyrgyzstan ===
A Kyrgyz subsidiary of Dimon had paid bribes to officials in the tobacco control agency, state government akims, and tax authorities.

=== Kenya ===
When the Kenyan subsidiary was restructured and the majority of management replaced in 2015, Pyxus discovered that material weaknesses and management override of controls led to recording of fictitious sales and an aggregate $39 million overstatement inventory, receivables and other assets. This violated filing and record keeping requirements of section 13 of the Securities Exchange Act. Through an administrative proceeding, the SEC ordered the company to stop violating these requirements.
