= Andreas Frivåg =

Norwegian politician (1925–1991)

Andreas Frivåg (12 August 1925 – 21 April 1991) was a Norwegian politician for the Socialist Left Party.

He served as a deputy representative to the Norwegian Parliament from Nordland during the term 1977–1981.
