= Friedrich Georg Nissen =

Norwegian civil servant (1887–1969)

Friedrich Georg Nissen (28 October 1887 - 1969) was a Norwegian civil servant.

He was born in Bergen, and was a cand.jur. by education. He was hired in the Ministry of Social Affairs in 1915, and was promoted to subdirector in 1919. In 1924 he changed to the Ministry of Finance and Customs. He was promoted to deputy under-secretary of State in 1933 and permanent under-secretary of State in 1952, before retiring in 1957.

Nissen chaired the board of the Norwegian State Educational Loan Fund from 1947 to 1960, and was a member of the council NAVF from 1949 to 1960.

Civic offices
Preceded by position created	Permanent under-secretary of state in the Ministry of Finance; 1952–1957	Succeeded by Eivind Erichsen
