= Lorents Lorentsen =

Norwegian civil servant (born 1947)

Lorents Lorentsen (born 5 March 1947) is a Norwegian civil servant.

A candidatus oeconomices by education, he was hired in Statistics Norway in 1979, and was promoted to head of research in 1987. He left in 1992 to become deputy under-secretary of State in the Ministry of Finance and Customs. He served as acting permanent under-secretary of State of the Ministry of Finance from 2002 to 2003, before being appointed as head of the Environment Directorate in the Organisation for Economic Co-operation and Development in 2003.
