= Lars Nymo Trulsen =

Norwegian footballer (born 1976)

Personal information
- Date of birth: 28 April 1976 (age 50)
- Height: 1.87 m (6 ft 2 in)
- Position: Defender

Senior career*
Years	Team	Apps	(Gls)
1993–1995	Målselv		
1996–1999	Finnsnes IL		
2000–2001	Tromsø	3	(0)
2002	Skarp		
2003–2006	Tromsdalen		
- * Club domestic league appearances and goals as of 29 March 2009

Lars Nymo Trulsen (born 28 April 1976) is a retired Norwegian football defender.

He grew up in Målselv Municipality, and made his debut for Målselv IL in 1993. He then played for Finnsnes IL from 1996 to 1999. Ahead of the 2000 season he signed for regional greats Tromsø IL. He made his debut in July 2000 against FK Bodø/Glimt, and got three Norwegian Premier League games; the last in July 2001. He played the 2002 season for IF Skarp, then joined Tromsdalen UIL. He retired after the 2006 season.
