= Jakob Kjersem =

Norwegian long-distance runner

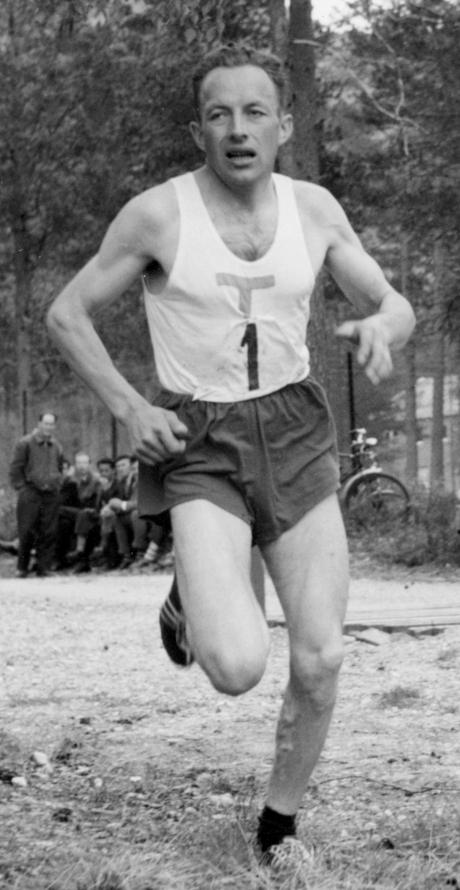
- Kjersem c. 1960

Personal information
- Born: 2 August 1925 Tresfjord, Norway
- Died: 11 June 2009 (aged 83) Vestnes, Norway

Sport
- Sport: Athletics
- Events: 10,000 m, marathon
- Club: Tresfjord IL

Achievements and titles
- Personal bests: 10,000 m – 30:13.8 (1956); Mar – 2:36:14 (1952)

Jakob Kjersem (2 August 1925 – 11 June 2009) was a Norwegian long-distance runner. At the 1948 Summer Olympics he finished twelfth in the 10,000 metres final, and at the 1952 Summer Olympics he placed 24th in the marathon. He never won the 10,000 m Norwegian title, placing second in 1948, 1949, 1951 and 1956. His rivals were Martin Stokken and Øistein Saksvik.

He also won medals in the 5000 metres and the marathon. He excelled in several now-defunct events, having seven national titles in the 25 kilometres road race, the 8 kilometres cross-country race as well as the forest race, won between 1949 and 1960.

He was a journalist and farmer by occupation, and published books on local sport history. He died in June 2009.
