= Universal Corporation =

Tobacco company, incorporated 1886 in the US

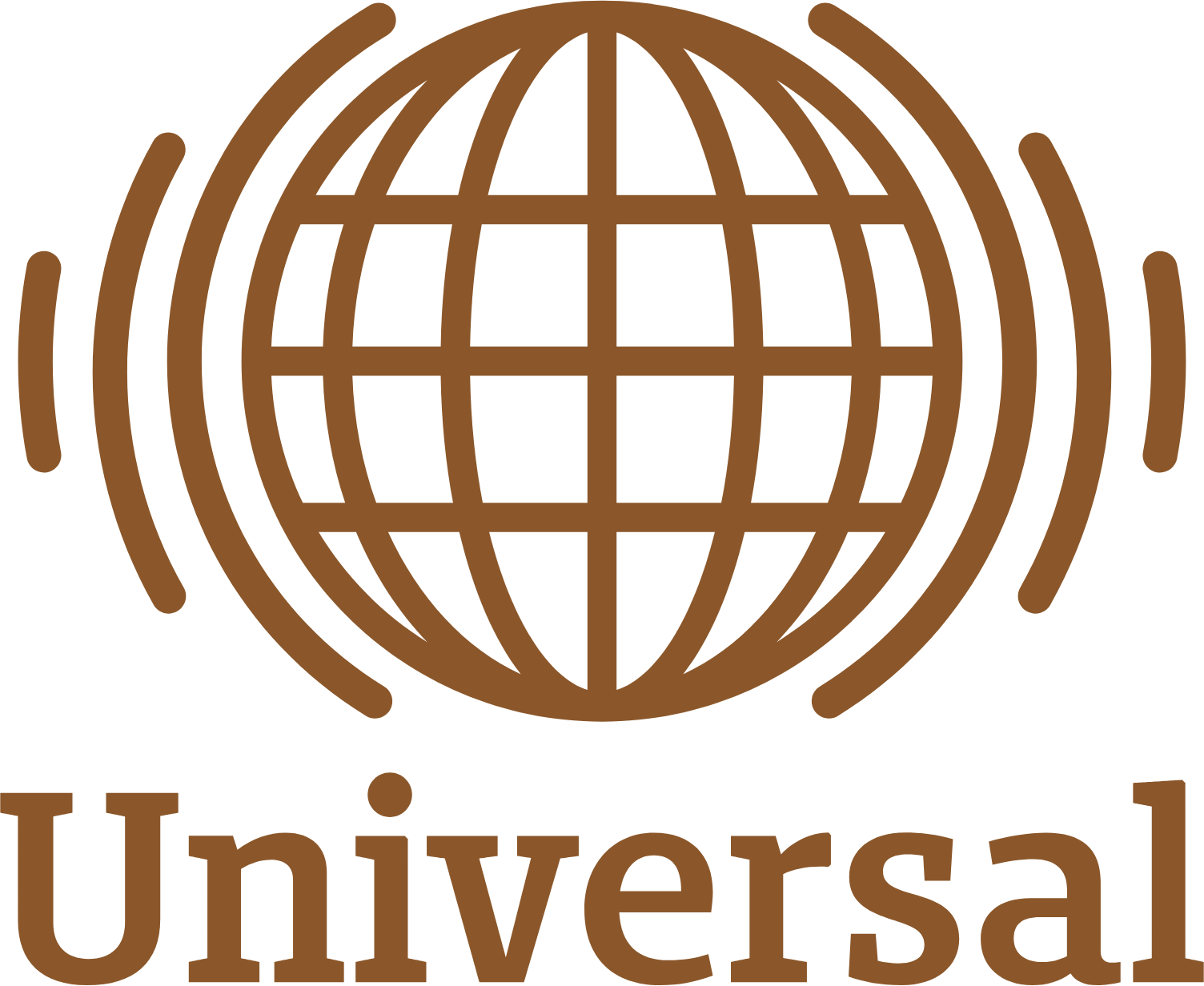
- Type: Public company
- Traded as: NYSE: UVV; S&P 600 component
- Industry: Tobacco
- Founded: 1886; 140 years ago
- Headquarters: Richmond, Virginia, United States
- Area served: Worldwide
- Products: Leaf tobaccos
- Revenue: ▼US$2.89 billion (2026)
- Net income: ▼US$32.6 million (2026)
- Website: www.universalcorp.com

Universal Corporation is one of the world's leading tobacco merchants. Incorporated in 1886, Universal is headquartered in Richmond, Virginia, in the United States.

== Current operations ==
Universal buys, sells, and processes flue-cured and burley tobacco. It also holds a 49% interest in Socotab, LLC, a large dealer in oriental leaf tobaccos. The company does not manufacture cigarettes or other consumer tobacco products, although its largest customer is Altria Group (owner of Philip Morris USA).

Universal common stock is part of the S&P 600 index.

== History ==
After the 1911 breakup of the American Tobacco Company trust, Jacquelin P. Taylor incorporated Universal out of six formerly independent leaf merchants.

On January 3, 2020, Universal purchased FruitSmart.

In 2021, Universal purchased Shank's Extract in Lancaster, PA

== Bribery ==
In 2010, Universal along with its competitor Pyxus (then Alliance One) were accused of violations of the Foreign Corrupt Practices Act. The company is alleged to have used its subsidiaries to pay $850,000, $165,000 and $800,000 to officials in Malawi, Mozambique and Thailand, respectively. The company paid about $9 million in penalties and refunded disgorged profits to settle the charges.
