= Øyvind =

Øyvind or Oyvind may refer to:

- Øyvind Aasland (born 1967), Norwegian darts player
- Øyvind Alapnes (born 1976), Norwegian football referee
- Jon Øyvind Andersen (born 1965), Norwegian black metal guitarist
- Carl Øyvind Apeland (born 1964), Norwegian musician plays bass, guitar and keyboard in the Norwegian band Vamp
- Øyvind Asbjørnsen (born 1963), Norwegian film producer and director
- Øyvind Berg (ski jumper) (born 1971), Norwegian ski jumper
- Øyvind Berg (lyric poet) (1959–1982), Norwegian lyric poet, playwright, actor and translator
- Øyvind Bjørnson (1950–2007), Norwegian historian specialising in labour history and the history of the welfare state
- Øyvind Bjorvatn (1931–2015), Norwegian politician for the Liberal Party and later the Liberal People's Party
- Øyvind Bolthof (born 1977), Norwegian football goalkeeper
- Øyvind Brandtsegg (born 1971), Norwegian musician (percussion, electronica) and programmer
- Øyvind S. Bruland (born 1952), Professor of Clinical Oncology, Faculty of Medicine, University of Oslo
- Øyvind Dahl (born 1951), retired Norwegian long-distance runner
- Øyvind Ellingsen (born 1975), Norwegian cardiologist
- Öyvind Fahlström (1928–1976), Swedish Multimedia artist
- Øyvind Grøn (born 1944), Norwegian physicist
- Øyvind Gram (born 1985), Norwegian football striker
- Øyvind Gustavsen (born 1937), Norwegian civil servant
- Øyvind Håbrekke (born 1969), Norwegian politician for the Christian Democratic Party
- Øyvind Halleraker (born 1951), Norwegian politician representing the Conservative Party
- Øyvind Hoås (born 1983), Norwegian football striker
- Øyvind Iversen (born 1999), better known as Wirtual, Norwegian video game streamer and Youtuber
- Øyvind Korsberg (born 1960), Norwegian politician for the Progress Party
- Øyvind Leonhardsen (born 1970), Norwegian former footballer
- Øyvind Mustaparta (born 1979), Norwegian musician (keyboard)
- Øyvind Myhre (born 1945), Norwegian author of science fiction and fantasy literature
- Øyvind Nordsletten (born 1944), Norwegian diplomat
- Øyvind Østerud (1944–2025), Norwegian political scientist
- Øyvind Rauset (born 1952), Norwegian artist, musician and composer
- Øyvind Rimbereid (born 1966), Norwegian author and composer of lyric poetry
- Øyvind Sandberg (born 1953), Norwegian film director
- Øyvind Skaanes (born 1968), former Norwegian cross country skier
- Øyvind Slåke (born 1965), Norwegian politician for the Labour Party
- Øyvind Staveland (born 1960), founder of the Norwegian band Vamp
- Øyvind Stene (born 1947), Norwegian engineer and businessperson
- Øyvind Alfred Stensrud (1887–1956), Norwegian politician for the Liberal Party
- Øyvind Storflor (born 1979), Norwegian football player
- Øyvind Svenning (born 1980), Norwegian football defender
- Øyvind Thorsen (1943–2025), Norwegian journalist, and author
- Øyvind Torvund (born 1976), Norwegian composer
- Øyvind Tveter (born 1954), former Norwegian speed skater
- Øyvind Vågnes (1972–2025), Norwegian novelist, magazine editor, and researcher
- Øyvind Vaksdal (born 1955), Norwegian politician for the Progress Party

== See also ==
- Eivind
- Øivind
