= Meidell =

Meidell is a surname. Notable people with the surname include:

- Frank Meidell Falch (1920–2013), Norwegian media director
- Gerhard Meidell Gerhardsen (1848–1912) (1848–1912), Norwegian bailiff and politician for the Conservative Party
- Gerhard Meidell Gerhardsen (1885–1931) (1885–1931), Norwegian bailiff and politician for the Conservative Party and Centre Party
- Gerhard Meidell Gerhardsen (1912-1986) (1912–1986), Norwegian economist
- Egil Meidell Hopp (1898–1972), Norwegian journalist and intelligence agent
- Einar Meidell Hopp (1899–1956), Norwegian broadcasting personality
- Christian Meidell Kahrs (1858–1924), Norwegian businessperson and politician for the Liberal Party and later the Coalition Party
- Arne Meidell (1894–1963), Norwegian jurist and businessperson
- Birger Meidell (1882–1958), professor, member of The Norwegian Science Academy, minister in the fascist NS government of Vidkun Quisling
- Christian Garup Meidell (1780–1863), Norwegian military officer and politician
- Ditmar Meidell (1826–1900), Norwegian magazine and newspaper editor
- Kristian Garup Meidell (1866–1926), Norwegian barrister
- Sigurd Segelcke Meidell (1878–1968), Norwegian journalist, genealogist and novelist

== See also ==
- Medel (disambiguation)
