= Even (given name) =

Even is a Norwegian given name coming from Old Norse Eivindr (existing as Eivindur in Iceland). Another common name derived from Old Norse Eivindr is the Norwegianized Eivind. Eivind, and variants such as Øyvind.

It can be theorized that the name has its origin in the Proto-Norse roots (*auja-, *-winduR) held to mean 'gift' and 'winner', respectively.

Notable people with the name include:

- Even Barli (born 1991), Norwegian footballer
- Even Benestad (born 1974), Norwegian documentary film director
- Even Blakstad (born 1968), Norwegian footballer
- Even Eriksen (born 1995), Norwegian politician
- Even Erlien (born 1955), Norwegian politician
- Even George (1875–1969), Australian politician
- Even Aleksander Hagen (born 1988), Norwegian politician
- Even Hammer (1732–1800), Norwegian civil servant
- Even Hansen (1790–1840), Norwegian civil servant and politician
- Even Hansen (footballer) (1923-2016), Norwegian footballer
- Even Helte Hermansen (born 1982), Norwegian guitarist
- Even Hammer Holmboe (1792–1859), Norwegian politician
- Even Hovdhaugen (1941–2018), Norwegian linguist and professor
- Even Hovland (born 1989), Norwegian footballer
- Even Johansen (born 1970), Norwegian singer-songwriter
- Even Torkildsen Lande (1758–1833), Norwegian politician
- Even Lange (born 1946), Norwegian economic historian
- Even Steven Levee (born 1951), American musician
- Even Northug (born 1995), Norwegian cross-country skier
- Even Ormestad (born 1978), Norwegian bassist and producer
- Even Østensen (born 1993), Norwegian footballer
- Even Pellerud (born 1953), Norwegian footballer and coach
- Even A. Røed (born 1992), Norwegian politician
- Even Skaarer, Norwegian sport shooter
- Even Skatrud (born 1977), Norwegian musician, composer, and orchestra leader
- Even Stevens (songwriter), American songwriter
- Even Stormoen (born 1955), Norwegian stage actor
- Even Thorsen (1778–1867), Norwegian sailor and farmer
- Even Tjiviju (born 1992), Namibian sprinter
- Even Tollefsen (1841–1897), Norwegian captain and inventor
- Even Tudeberg (born 1963), Estonian biathlete and sport personnel
- Even Ulving (1863–1952), Norwegian painter
- Even Vengshoel (1891–1968), Norwegian long-distance runner
- Even Wetten (born 1982), Norwegian speed skater

Fictional characters

- Even, the original identity of Vexen from the Kingdom Hearts series
- Even Bech Næsheim, a recurring character in the Norwegian series Skam

== See also ==
- Odd (name)
