= Øivind =

Øivind may refer to:

- Øivind Blunck (born 1950), Norwegian comedian and actor
- Øivind Bolstad (1905–1979), Norwegian playwright and novelist
- Øivind Holmsen (1912–1996), Norwegian international footballer
- Øivind Jensen (1905–1989), Norwegian boxer
- Øivind Larsen (born 1938), Norwegian physician
- Birger Øivind Meidell (1882–1958), Norwegian government minister
- Øivind Tomteberget (born 1953), retired Norwegian football midfielder
- Tor Øivind Ødegård (born 1969), retired Norwegian middle-distance runner

== See also ==
- Øyvind
- Eivind
