= Borregaard =

Norwegian chemical company

Borregaard ASA
- Company type: Allmennaksjeselskap
- Traded as: OSE: BRG
- Industry: Chemicals
- Founded: 1889
- Headquarters: Sarpsborg, Norway
- Website: www.borregaard.no

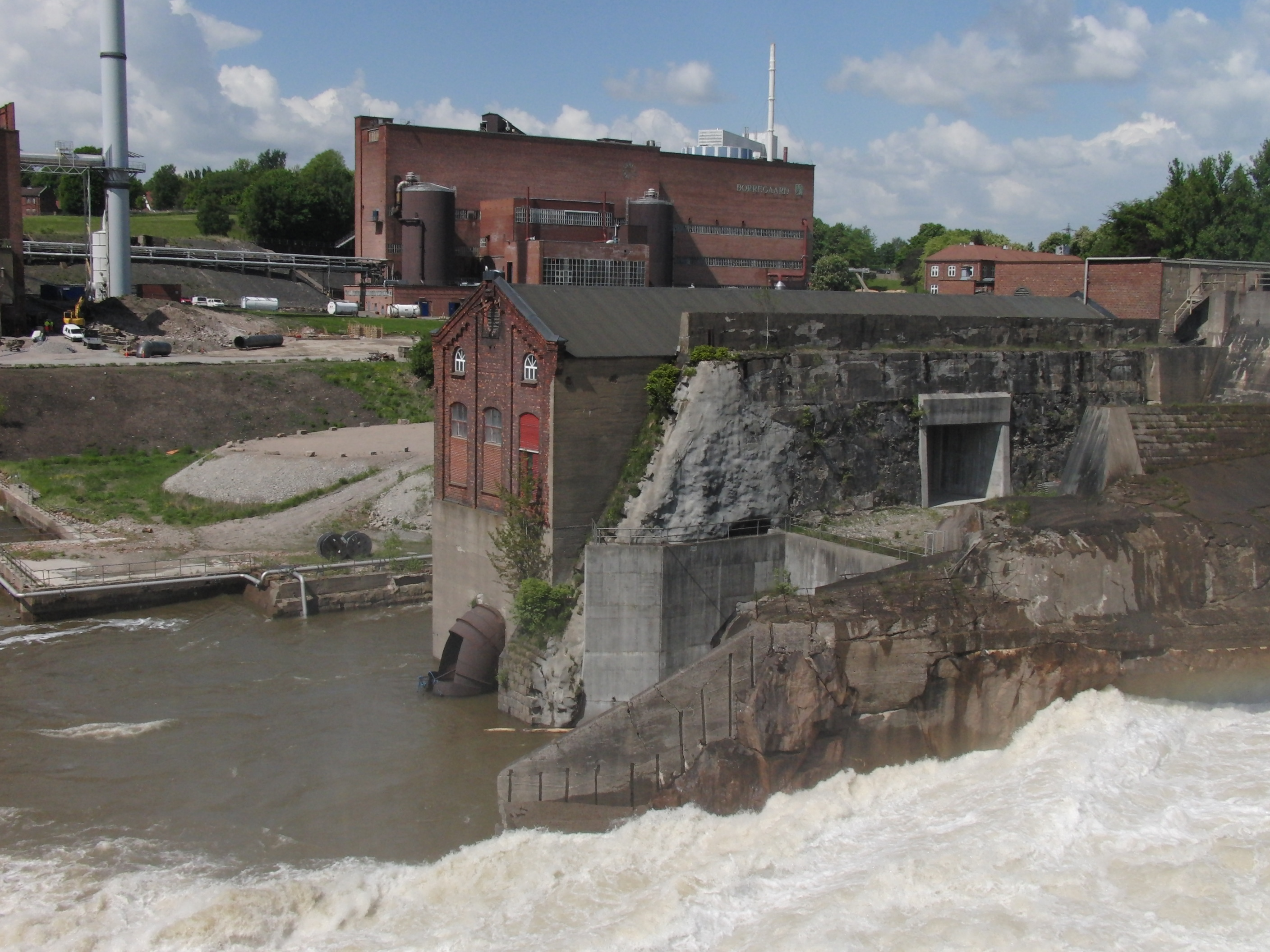
Borregaard power station at Sarpsfossen waterfall and factory building in the background.

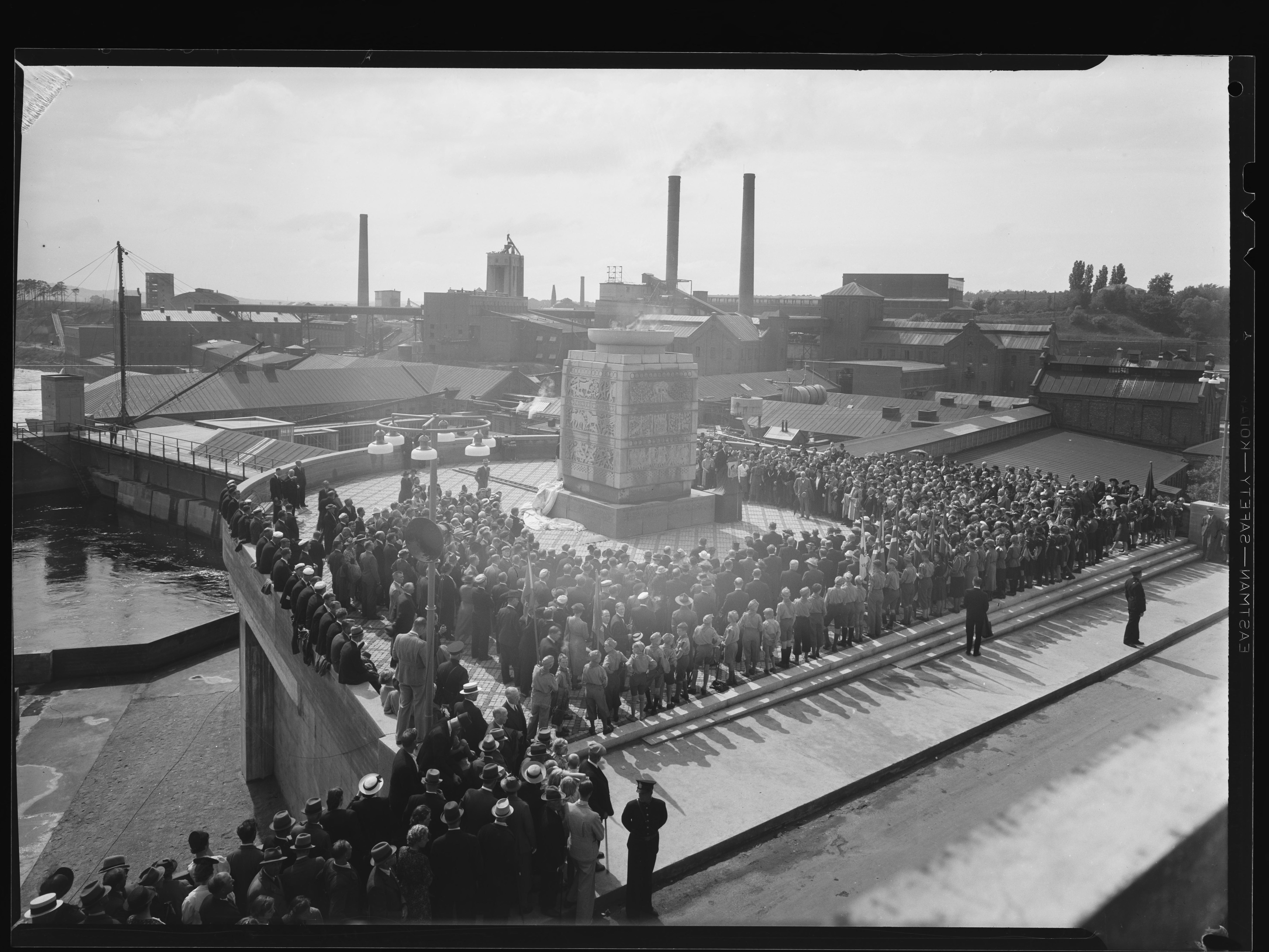
Celebration of the company's 50th anniversary in 1939.

Borregaard is a Norwegian company established in 1889 in the southeastern town of Sarpsborg in Østfold county. Its main products were traditionally pulp and paper. The company later started producing chemicals based on timber as a raw material. After a takeover in 1986, Borregaard was part of the chemical division of the Orkla Group until it was spun off and introduced to the Oslo Stock Exchange in October 2012. It had 1050 employees in 2016.

The company's core business is based on a biorefinery that manufactures products based on the different components in wood. Important products are speciality cellulose, lignin products (lignosulphonates), bio ethanol, yeast and yeast extracts and lignin-based vanillin. The company also produces ethyl vanillin, diphenols and fine chemicals.

== History ==
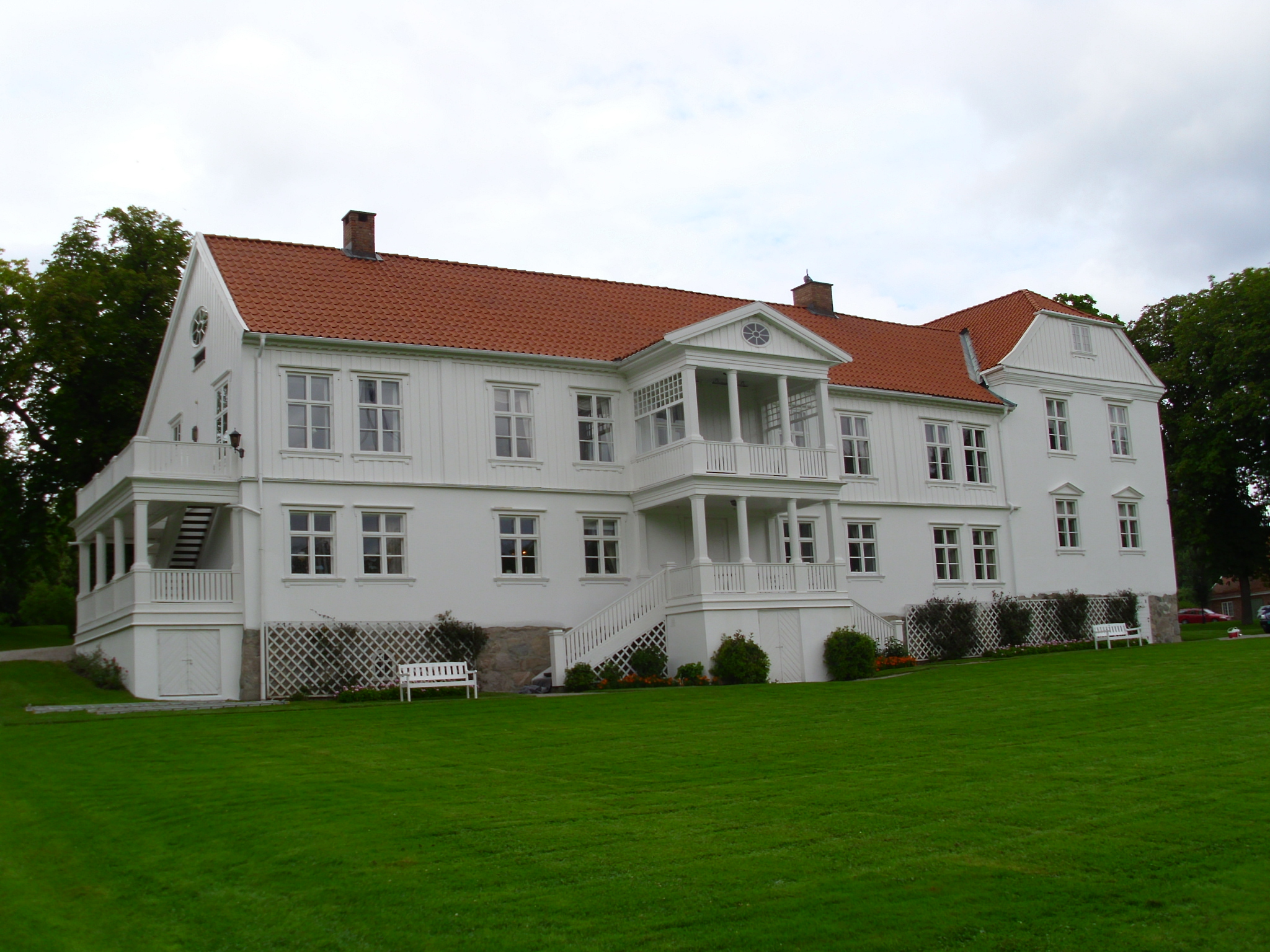
Borregaard Hovedgård, the estate manor, since 1988 Orkla's conference center, which hosted the secret negotiations that led to the Oslo Accords between Israel and the Palestine Liberation Organization (PLO) in 1993.

The name "Borregaard" was connected to Borgargjerdi, the royal seat during the reign of Olav the Holy (1016). In 1312 the estate was handed over from the king and became a country estate which changed hands several times until 1889, when British company The Kellner Partington Paper Pulp Co. Ltd. became its owner. This company built a cellulose factory near Sarpsfossen waterfall.

In 1918 a holding company called Borregaard was established in order to transfer the business into Norwegian hands.

Until the Second World War Borregaard's main products were cellulose and paper, but then Borregaard started production of various chemical products and activities in other areas.

In 1986 Borregaard merged with Orkla Industries into Orkla Borregaard. When Orkla Borregaard then merged with Nora Industries in 1992, the new company took the name Orkla, while the chemicals business kept the Borregaard name.

On the 18th of October 2012 Borregaard was separated from Orkla and was listed on the Oslo Stock Exchange.

== Subsidiaries ==
=== Borregaard ChemCell ===
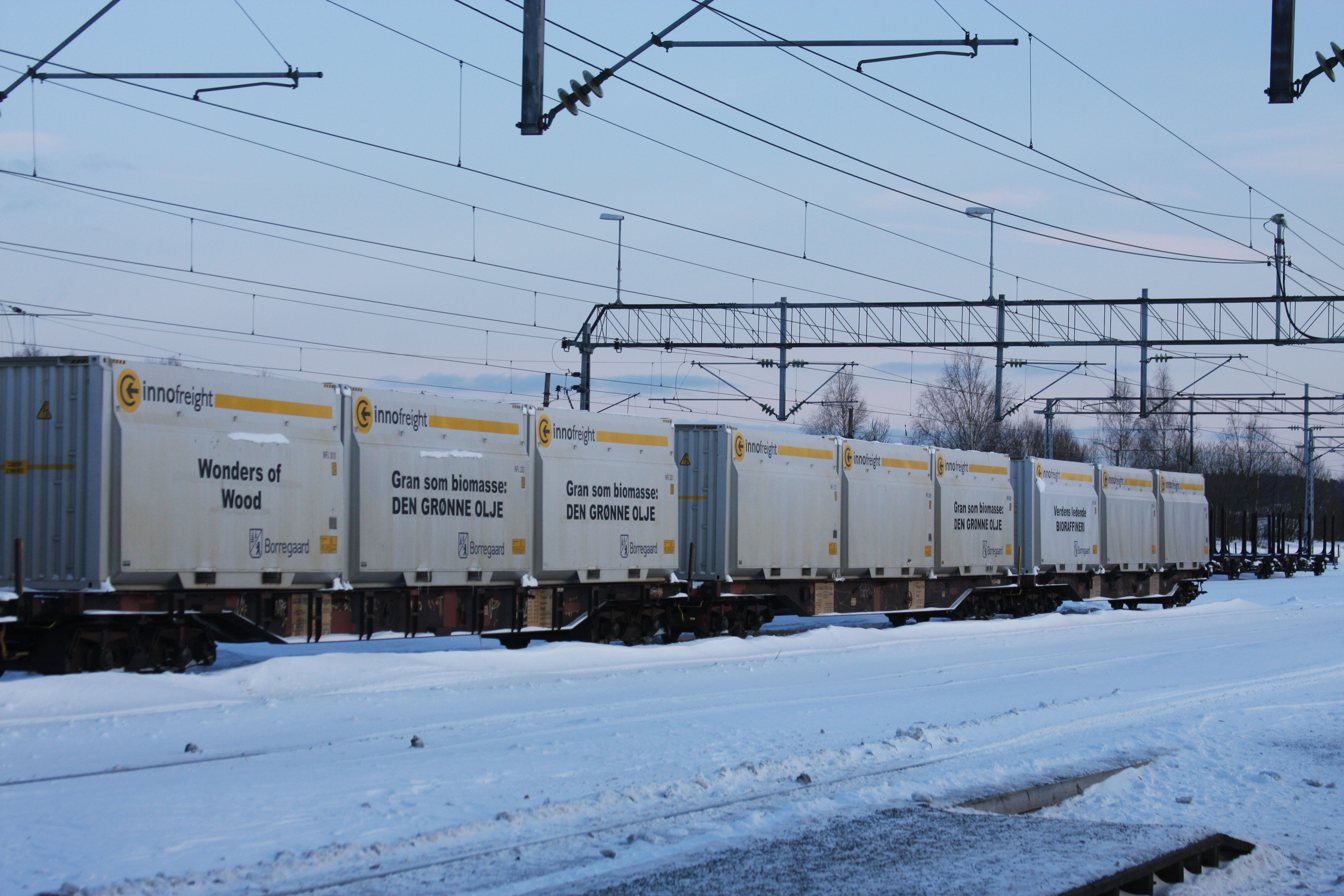
Train carrying spruce-based biomass from Borregaard, at Sarpsborg station.

Borregaard ChemCell is a producer of advanced speciality cellulose based on softwood, spruce. Borregaards has a cellulose plant in Sarpsborg, Norway. 2002 brought Borregaard an additional ChemCell plant in Solothurn, Switzerland. This plant was closed 2008.

Customers are manufacturers of cellulose derivatives, such as cellulose ethers and esters, acetate cellulose and micro-crystalline cellulose. Borregaard ChemCell also produces cellulose for textile fibres, plastic products and a variety of paper qualities.

Borregaard's plant in Norway was erected in 1891. The Swiss plant, formerly Atisholz, started production as early as 1884. Both plants utilize a calcium sulphite based digesting proses which gives high viscosity cellulose with high purity.

Bio ethanol and basic chemicals The sugar compounds in wood is used to manufacture bio ethanol. Borregaard also produces caustic soda, hydrochloric acid and bleaching chemicals for captive use and for sale to external customers.

=== Borregaard LignoTech ===
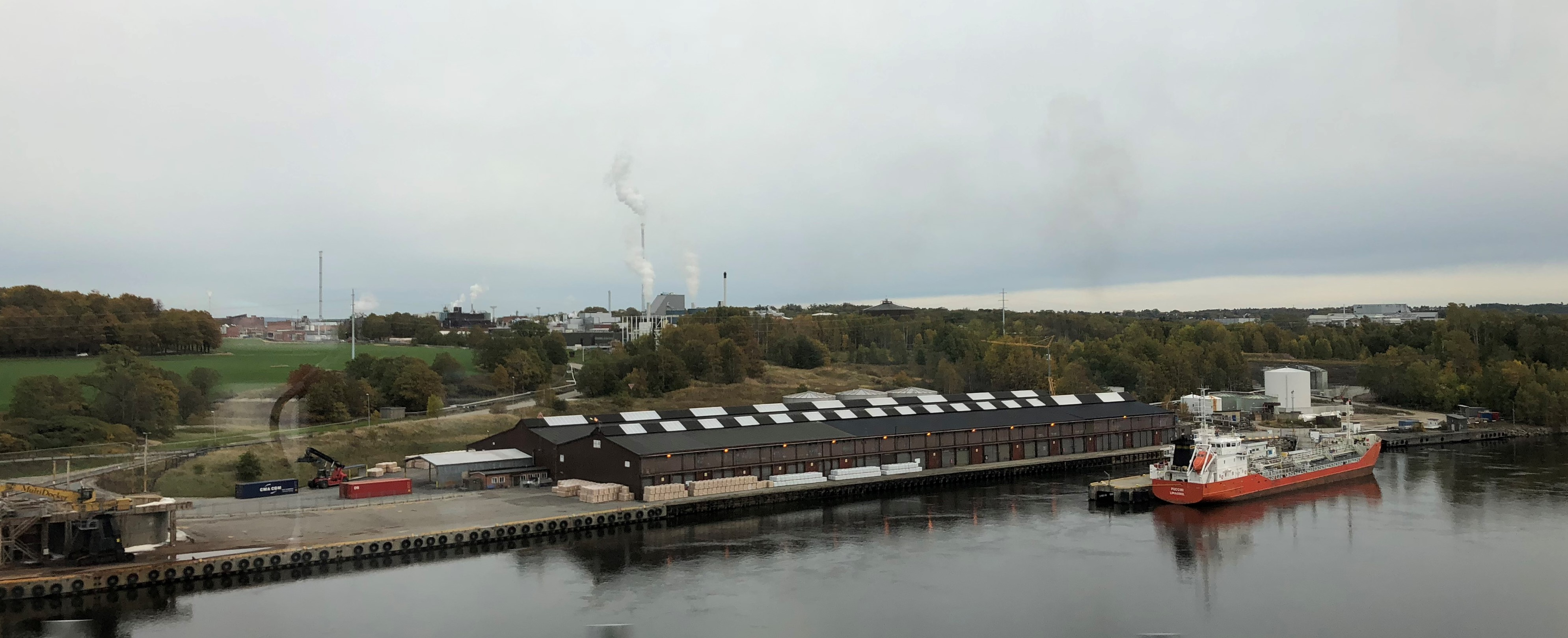
The port facilities of Borregaard factory in Sarpsborg (Norway), seen from the Sannessund Bridge (E6).

Borregaard LignoTech is a supplier of lignin-based binding and dispersing agents (lignosulphonate). Lignin is the binding agent in wood and is extracted as lignosulphonate during the production of cellulose. The company has production units in Norway, the US, Brazil, Germany, and the UK, and joint venture units in South Africa, Spain, and the US.

LignoTech's lignin products are used as dispersing agents in concrete, textile dyes, agrochemicals, batteries and ceramic products, or as binding agents in animal feed and briquettes. Lignin products improve the end-use properties and strengthen the structure of concrete. Lignin-based products are also used in connection with oil drilling.

=== Borregaard Synthesis ===
Borregaard Synthesis provides intermediates for non-ionic X-ray contrast media, and has dedicated plants for this market. The company also supplies advanced intermediates, active pharmaceutical ingredients (APIs) for several medicines. The production facility is located at the Borregaard production site in Sarpsborg, Norway.

The company also produces diphenols at its plant in Ravenna, Italy.

=== Borregaard Ingredients ===
Borregaard manufactures several ingredients based on natural raw materials.

Omega-3 oil: Borregaard supplies omega-3 specialty oils designed for use in functional food such as dairy products, juice, sausages and sweets.

Vanillin: The company is the only supplier of vanillin produced from wood (lignin). Borregaard also supplies vanillin and ethyl vanillin products based on petrochemical raw materials.

Yeast products: Borregaard's plant in Switzerland produces protein-rich torula yeast, based on sugar compounds in wood, for use in food products and selected animal feed products. Borregaard also manufactures various yeast extracts that are used as taste enhancers with good nutritional properties in sauces, soups, baby food, pizza and meat products.

== General directors and managing directors ==
- 1918–1933 : Hjalmar Wessel
- 1933–1960 : Arne Meidell
- 1960–1978 : Rein Henriksen
- 1978–1985 : Oddmund Sørhuus
- 1986–1999 : Egil Ullebø
- 1999– : Per Sørlie

== Legionella epidemic ==
In May 2005 there was a legionellosis outbreak in Fredrikstad/Sarpsborg area. It was confirmed that an air scrubber on Borregaard's plant in Sarpsborg, Norway was the source of the worst legionella epidemic in Norwegian history. The epidemic spread to at least 56 people, ten of whom died.

In 2008 there was a new legionellosis outbreak in Fredrikstad/Sarpsborg area. This time the conclusion was that the biological treatment plant was connected with both outbreaks. The biological treatment plant was immediately shut down. A replacement plant based on different technology was opened in February 2014.

== See also ==
- Statskog
