= Odd =

Odd may refer to:

== Mathematics ==
- Even and odd numbers, an integer is odd if dividing by two does not yield an integer
- Even and odd functions, a function is odd if f(−x) = −f(x) for all x
- Even and odd permutations, a permutation of a finite set is odd if it is composed of an odd number of transpositions

== Arts and entertainment ==
- Odd Della Robbia, a character in the animated television series Code Lyoko
- Odd Thomas (character), a character in a series of novels by Dean Koontz
- The protagonist of Odd and the Frost Giants, a book by Neil Gaiman
- "Odd", a science fiction short story by John Wyndham in the collection The Seeds of Time
- Odd (album), an album by the South Korean boy band Shinee
- "Odd", a song by Loona Odd Eye Circle from Mix & Match
- "Odd", a song by Ive from Revive+

== Ships ==
- HNoMS Odd, a Storm-class patrol boat of the Royal Norwegian Navy
- Odd I, a Norwegian whaler

== Other uses ==
- Odd (name), a male name common in Norway
- Odd, West Virginia, U.S., an unincorporated community
- Odds BK, an association football club in Norway.

== See also ==
- ODD (disambiguation), an initialism
- Odds, from probability theory and gambling
- Oddity (disambiguation)
