= Kristian Hopp =

Norwegian politician (1870–1954)

Kristian Ludvig Andreassen Hopp (11 June 1870 – 24 June 1954) was a Norwegian educator and politician for the Labour Party.

He was born in Kragerø as a son of shipmaster Lorentz Andreassen and his wife Anne Marie Olsen. He graduated from Hamar Teachers' College in 1889, and took the examen artium in 1892. He worked as a teacher in Grimstad from 1892 to 1895, then in Bergen. He was a member of the executive committee of Bergen city council from 1903 to 1919, representing the Labour Party, and was the Mayor of Bergen in 1918 and 1919. he also represented his party in the Defence Commission of 1920.

In parliamentary elections Hopp was a losing candidate four times, in 1909, 1912, 1915 and 1918. On the first and last occasion he lost to Fredrik Ludvig Konow, on the two others to Johan Ludvig Mowinckel. Hopp always stood in the constituency Nordnes.

Together with Anna Christine Meidell (1875–1945) he had the sons Einar Meidell Hopp and Egil Meidell Hopp. Through the former, he was the father-in-law of Zinken Hopp. Kristian Hopp died in 1954.

Political offices
| Preceded by Einar Greve | Mayor of Bergen; 1918–1919 | Succeeded by Henrik Ameln |
