= Eivind =

Eivind is a Norwegian masculine given name of Norse origin, Auja-winduR. It is made up of two parts: Auja meaning "lucky/gift", and winduR meaning "winner and/or warrior".

The name Eivind is also used in Denmark and Sweden, and as Eyvindur in Iceland, though appearing less frequently than in Norway.

Variations of the name include Eyvind, Øivind, Øyvind and Even.

== People with the name ==
- Eivind Aadland, Norwegian conductor
- Eivind Aarset, Norwegian guitarist
- Eivind Eckbo (1927–2017), Norwegian politician and lawyer
- Eivind Groven, Norwegian composer
- Eivind Helland (born 2005), Norwegian footballer
- Eivind Henriksen (born 1990), Norwegian hammer thrower
- Eivind Gullberg Jensen, Norwegian conductor
- Eivind Reiten, Norwegian economist and former politician
- Eivind Rekustad, Norwegian Weightlifter

== See also ==
- Eoghan
