= Simon in the Land of Chalk Drawings =

British children's TV series (1974–1976)

- Genre: Children's television series
- Created by: Edward McLachlan
- Written by: Glyn Frewler
- Directed by: Ivor Wood
- Narrated by: Bernard Cribbins
- Theme music composer: Mike Batt
- Composer: Mike Batt
- Country of origin: United Kingdom
- Original language: English
- No. of series: 2
- No. of episodes: 24

Production
- Editor: Helen Kelsey
- Running time: 5 minutes
- Production companies: FilmFair London; Thames Television

Original release
- Network: ITV
- Release: 5 October 1974 – 1976

Simon in the Land of Chalk Drawings is a British children's animated series about the adventures of a young boy named Simon, who has a magic blackboard. Things that Simon draws on the chalkboard become real in the Land of Chalk Drawings, a parallel world which Simon can enter by climbing over a fence near his home with a ladder. The stories often revolve around the unintended effects that Simon's drawings have on the Land of Chalk Drawings, such as when an upset Simon draws a picture of his angry self, which goes on a rampage.

The programme is based upon a series of four children's books by Edward McLachlan. It was produced in the mid-1970s by FilmFair Productions in London for ITV and was originally a five-minute programme, broadcast around tea time in Britain. Despite that, it was first screened in Canada during CBC's Children's Cinema program on 5 October 1974 while selected ITV regions didn't start showing the program until 27 March 1976. It also became familiar to North American audiences in the mid-1970s when it was featured on Captain Kangaroo (where it was narrated by host Bob Keeshan instead of Bernard Cribbins), later on Pinwheel, and after that, on Romper Room. In Canada, it aired on TVOntario. The writer and performer of the theme song is Mike Batt, with his first wife Wendy on vocals. Mike Batt also wrote the theme for The Wombles, also produced by FilmFair and narrated by Bernard Cribbins.

== Original episodes ==
=== Series overview ===
Series	Episodes	First aired	Last aired
1	12	5 October 1974	1975
2	12	1975	1976

=== Series 1 ===
No. overall	No. in series	Title
1	1	"Simon Meets Henry"
2	2	"Simon Meets the Teacher and the Children"
3	3	"Simon and the Chalk Drawing Band"
4	4	"Simon and the Moon Rocket (part one)"
5	5	"Simon and the Moon Rocket (part two)"
6	6	"Simon and the Caveman"
7	7	"Simon and the Sea"
8	8	"Simon and the Chameleon"
9	9	"Simon's Double"
10	10	"Simon and the Elephant"
11	11	"Simon and the Football Match"
12	12	"Simon and the Return Match"

=== Series 2 ===
No. overall	No. in series	Title
13	1	"Simon and the Early Morning"
14	2	"Simon and the Chalk Drawing Cars"
15	3	"Simon and the Dinosaur"
16	4	"Simon and the Knight"
17	5	"Simon and the Rainbow"
18	6	"Simon and the Pied Piper"
19	7	"Simon and the Robot"
20	8	"Simon and the Measles"
21	9	"Simon and the Flags"
22	10	"Simon and the Chalk Drawing Sports Day"
23	11	"Simon and the Pop Singer"
24	12	"Simon and the Detective"

== 2002 revival ==
Simon in the Land of Chalk Drawings
- Genre: Children's television
- Narrated by: Ernie Coombs (Canadian version)
- Countries of origin: Canada; China
- Original language: English
- No. of series: 1
- No. of episodes: 13 (65 shorts)

Production
- Running time: 5 minutes
- Production companies: CINAR Corporation; Shanghai Animation Film Studio

Original release
- Network: Teletoon; OTV (Shanghai Media Group)
- Release: 2 September – 18 September 2002

A new series premiered in 2002 on Teletoon in Canada with a new theme song, a new character in that of Lily, who was added to make the show appeal to girl viewers, an updated and more casual outfit for Simon, a different colour scheme and narrated by Ernie Coombs.

== Parody ==
The series was later parodied on NBC's Saturday Night Live by Mike Myers. The sketches open with the same musical theme and similar lyrics, but take place in Simon's bathtub, where he shows and discusses his "drawrings" with viewers. The Simon sketches aired between 1990 and 1994.

== See also ==
- The Magic Chalk (1949)
- ChalkZone (1998/2002)
- Harold and the Purple Crayon (1955)
- Penny Crayon (1989)
- Zaczarowany ołówek
