= Bruland (surname) =

Bruland is a Norwegian surname. Notable people with the surname include:

- Anders Trulsson Bruland (1770–1818), Norwegian civil servant and politician
- Bjarte Bruland (born 1969), Norwegian historian
- Øyvind S. Bruland (born 1952), Norwegian oncologist
- Sverre Bruland (1923–2013), Norwegian trumpeter and conductor
