= Brochmann =

Brochmann is a surname of Scandinavian or Germanic origin. Notable people with the surname include:

- Bertram Dybwad Brochmann (1881–1956), Norwegian businessman, writer and politician
- Georg Brochmann (1894–1952), Norwegian journalist and writer
- Grete Brochmann (born 1957), Norwegian sociologist
- Maria Brochmann (born 1993), Norwegian footballer
- Odd Brochmann (1909–1992), Norwegian architect and writer
- Tonny Brochmann (born 1989), Danish footballer
