= Meidl =

Meidl is a surname. Notable people with the surname include:

- Cliff Meidl (born 1966), American sprint kayaker
- Radek Meidl (born 1988), Czech ice hockey player
- Václav Meidl (born 1986), Czech ice hockey player, brother of Radek

== See also ==
- Meidell
