= Bjørn Berge =

Norwegian guitarist and blues artist

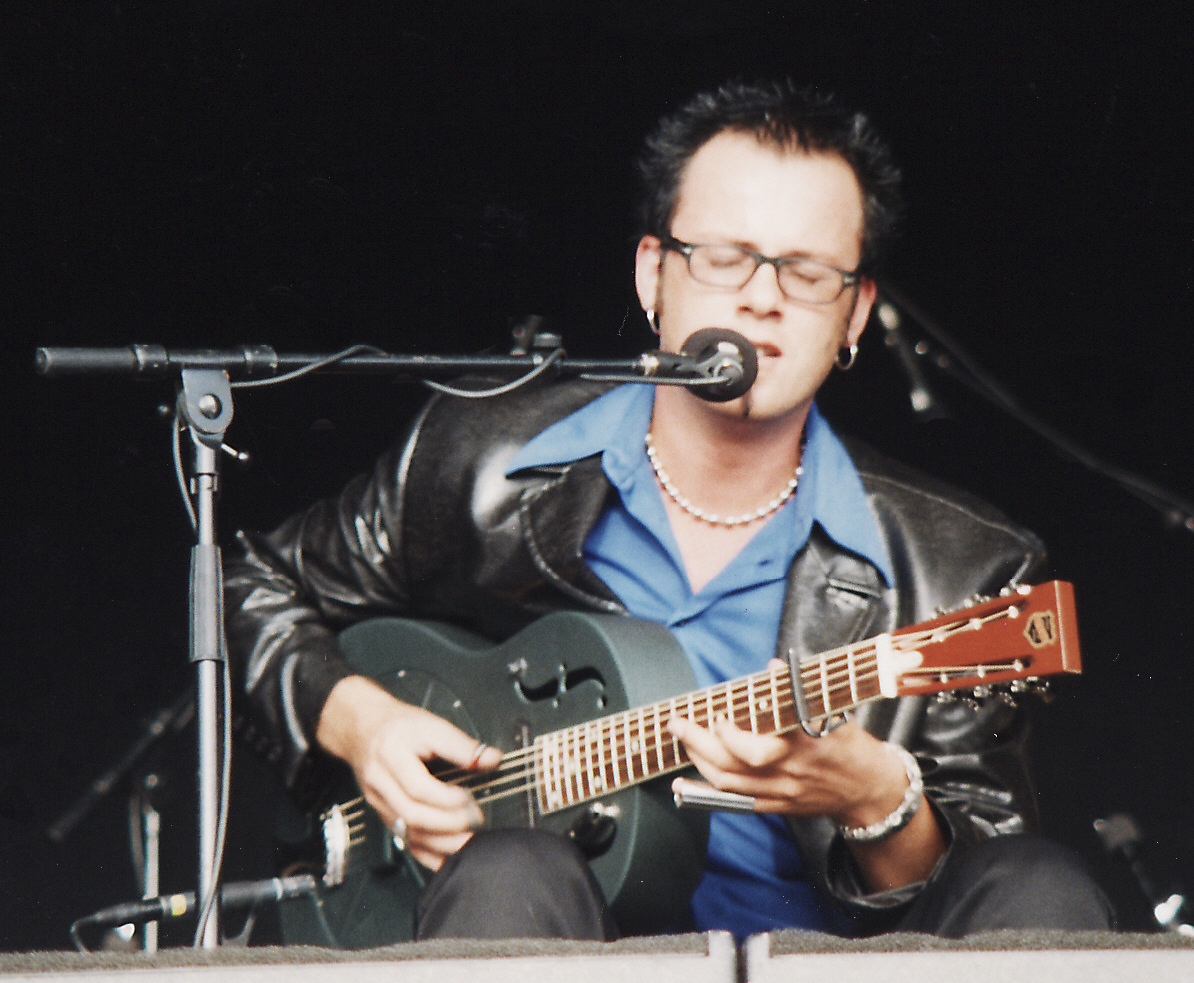

Background information
- Born: 23 September 1968 (age 57); Sveio Municipality, Norway
- Genres: Blues
- Occupations: Musician, songwriter
- Instruments: Guitar, vocals
- Website: bjorn-berge.com

Bjørn Berge (born in Sveio, Norway on 23 September 1968) is a Norwegian guitarist and blues artist.

== Career ==
After being named "Best Musician of the Year" by Dagbladet in 1998, In 2001, he won Spellemannprisen for his album Stringmachine and in 2002 for his album Illustrated Man. He also toured all over Europe gaining more popularity, and won the NBFs Bluespros in 2001. In 2014 Berge replaced Torbjørn Økland as guitarist in the Norwegian band Vamp.

== Honors ==
- 1998: Named "Best Musician of the Year" by Dagbladet
- 2001: Spellemannprisen in the category Blues
- 2001: NBFs Bluespros
- 2002: Spellemannprisen in the category Blues

== Discography ==
Year	Album	Peak positions	Certification
Year	Album	NOR	Certification
2000	Bag of Nails	19	
2001	Stringmachine	36	
2002	Illustrated Man	11	
2004	St. Slide	39	
2006	We're Gonna Groove	25	
2007	I'm The Antipop	26	
2009	Fretwork	37	
2011	Blackwood	37	
2013	Mad Fingers Ball	35	
2019	Who Else?		

Preceded by no blues award in 2000	Recipient of the Blues Spellemannprisen; 2001/2002	Succeeded by Vidar Busk
