= Blochmann =

Blochmann or Blochman is a surname. Notable people with the surname include:

- Elisabeth Blochmann (1892–1972), German educator
- Heinrich Blochmann (1838–1878), German iranist in Kolkata
- Lawrence Blochman (1900–1975), American writer and translator

== See also ==
- Brochmann
