= Ulving =

Ulving is a surname. Notable people with the surname include:

- Even Ulving (1863–1952), Norwegian painter.
- Jenny Ulving (born 1979), Swedish film and television actress
