= Håkon Jacobsen =

Norwegian engineer and executive officer (born 1962)

Håkon Jacobsen (born 1962) is a Norwegian engineer and executive officer. Since 2008 he has been CEO of Blom.

== Biography ==
Jacobsen is educated with a MSc in Engineering from the Norwegian Institute of Technology. He worked for 20 years as a consultant, and later partner in Accenture before he was hired by Blom. In Accenture he worked within telecom and high tech, and lived six years in Beijing, China.
