= Øyvind Rauset =

Norwegian artist, musician and composer (born 1952)

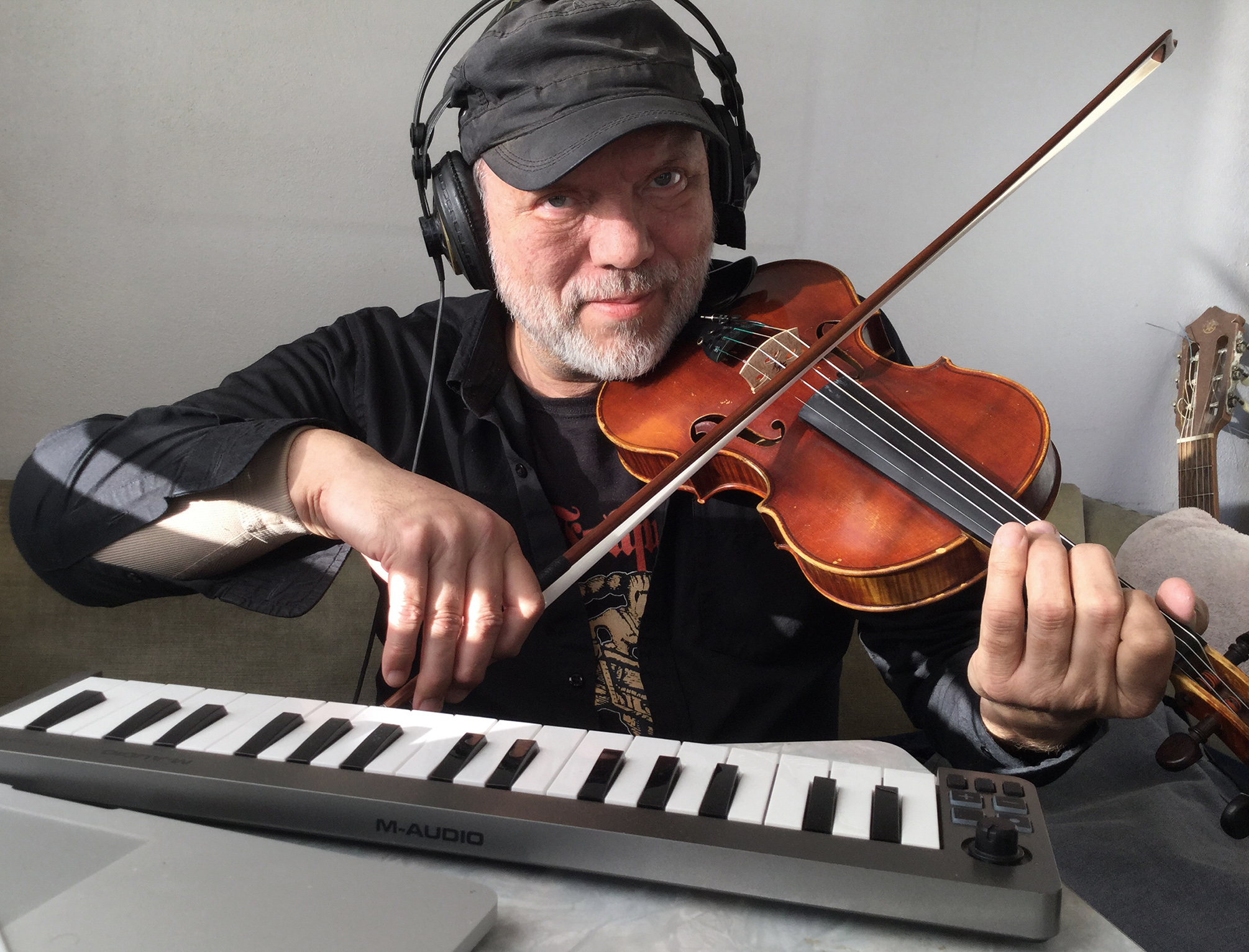
Øyvind Rauset

Øyvind Rauset (born October 3, 1952) is a Norwegian artist, musician and composer.

Rauset was born in Oslo, the son of Per Rauset from Gloppen and Mary Lyngmo from Rossfjordstraumen. He studied at the Art Academy of Oslo and Østlandets Music Conservatory.

He was a violinist in two famous folk rock bands from Norway, Folque and Ym-Stammen, but is more widely known for his own music on the two albums Landscape With Two Figures (with British songwriter Richard James Burgess, 1982) and 13 Impossible Dances + 1 Improbable (1988, revised 1992). He has also made music for TV programs in the NRK1 (The Norwegian Broadcasting). In April 2002 he was featured guest in the talk show "Stereo" (NRK1+2).

Rauset organized Night and Day, the first Scandinavian exhibition of gay and lesbian art, in 1985, and is a cultural ambassador of the International Lesbian and Gay Cultural Network. He has participated several years at the Autumn Exhibition (Høstutstillingen), the main annual show for Norway's artists.

Rauset also works as a graphic designer. For ten years he made monograms for the Norwegian royal family, and made the first digital edition of Norway's Coat of Arms (Riksvåpenet) in cooperation with its designer Sverre Morken of Norges Bank. Since 2005 he has restarted his musical career and was chairman of the Oslo songwriter club "Nye Skalder" 2004–2006. In 2007 he became editor of the Norwegian songwriter website "viser.no" and, from 2013, editor of the Scandinavian music periodical VISOR. Both in 2006 and 2014 Rauset was a finalist in ISC, the International Songwriting Competition (of Nashville, US).
