= Odd Brochmann =

Norwegian architect, professor and children's writer

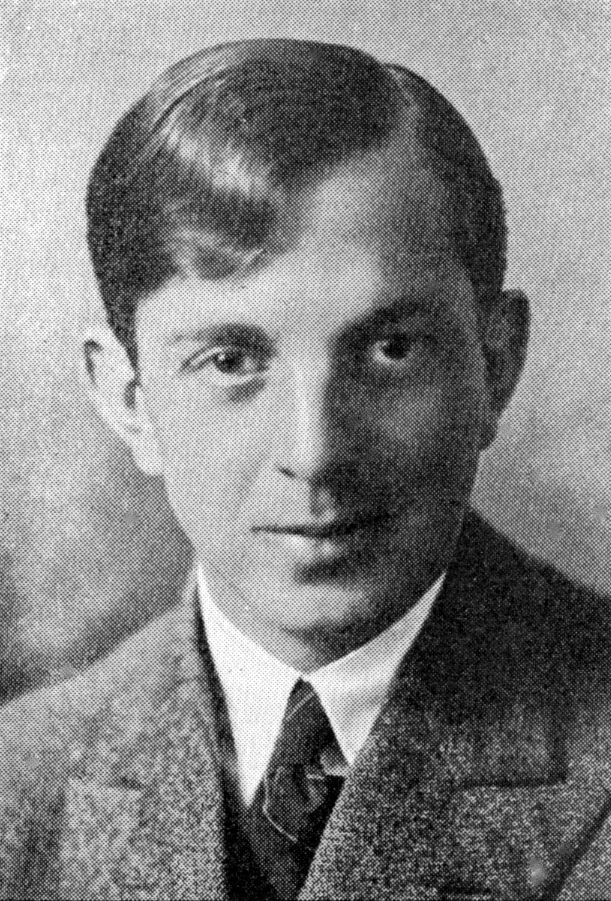
- Odd Brochmann c. 1935.
- Born: 21 December 1909; Kristiania, Norway
- Died: 27 October 1992 (aged 82)
- Education: Norwegian Institute of Technology
- Occupations: architect and children's writer
- Relatives: Zinken Hopp (sister)
- Awards: Order of St. Olav

Odd Brochmann (21 December 1909 – 27 October 1992) was a Norwegian architect, professor and children's writer.

== Background ==
Brochmann was born in Kristiania (now Oslo), Norway. He was a son of Diderik Hegermann Brochmann (1879–1955) and Margit Hagen (1896–1962). He was a brother of the poet and playwright Zinken Hopp and a nephew of the journalist and playwright Georg Brochmann. He graduated from the Norwegian Institute of Technology in 1934.

== Career ==
Brochmann established his own practice in Oslo in 1937, along with his first wife, Karen Berner. After World War II, he was involved in building projects at Ljan and Tveita in Oslo, and the designing of social institutions nationwide. From 1949 to 1956, he was appointed professor at the Norwegian Institute of Technology in Trondheim. From 1952, he worked with the architect Dag Rognlien (1921-1999). Brochmann also wrote literature on the relationship between architecture and society. He made a considerable effort by processing and releasing the collected material of housing surveys in Oslo in the years 1948-1961. He discontinued his architectural practice in 1963 and settled in Copenhagen, where he worked as a writer (including for Politiken 1964-1966). He also wrote travelogues, worked as a draftsman and as a teacher at the Royal Danish Academy of Fine Arts.

He was also widely used as an illustrator. Among his children's books are Mariannes brev from 1946 and Marianne på sykehus from 1948. He also illustrated children's books written by Heljar Mjøen (1903–2000) and Einar Schibbye (1900-1959).

== Personal life ==
Brochmann was married twice. In 1935, he married fellow architect Karen Berner (1908-1988). The marriage was dissolved in 1963. In 1963, he married the architect and research librarian Ida Caline Naur (1923-2000).

He became honorary doctor at Chalmers University of Technology in 1981 and an honorary member of the Norwegian Architects National Association (NAL) from 1981. He was also decorated as a Knight of the Order of St. Olav.
