= Eyvind =

Eyvind is a masculine given name. Its variant is Eivind. Notable people with the name include:

- Eyvind Alnæs (1872–1932), Norwegian composer, pianist, organist and choir director
- Eyvind Andersen (1874–1939), Norwegian judge
- Eyvind Bødtker (1867–1932), Norwegian chemist
- Eyvind Braggart, one of Queen Gunnhild's brothers, a character in Egil's Saga
- Eyvind Bratt (1907–1987), Swedish diplomat
- Eyvind Brynildsen (born 1988), Norwegian rally driver
- Eyvind Earle (1916–2000), American artist, author and illustrator
- Eyvind Finnson, 10th-century Norwegian skald
- Eyvind Getz (1888–1956), Norwegian barrister and mayor of Oslo, Norway
- Eyvind Fjeld Halvorsen (1922–2013), Norwegian philologist
- Eyvind Hellstrøm (born 1948), chef & formerly part owner of Bagatelle restaurant, Oslo
- Eyvind Johan-Svendsen (1896–1946), Danish stage and film actor
- Eyvind Johnson (1900–1976), Swedish novelist and short story writer
- Eyvind Kang (born 1971), composer and violist
- Eyvind Lambi, Norwegian Viking and hersir of the late ninth and early tenth centuries
- Eyvind Mehle (1895–1945), Norwegian radio personality, media professor and Nazi collaborator
- Eyvind Skeie (born 1947), Norwegian priest and author
- Eyvind Solås (1937–2011), Norwegian musician, composer, actor and program host in NRK
- Halvdan Eyvind Stokke (1900–1977), Norwegian railway director and Mayor of Oslo
- Pehr Eyvind Svinhufvud (1861–1944), the third President of Finland from 1931 to 1937
- Eyvind W. Wang (born 1942), Norwegian politician for the Conservative Party
- Eyvind Wichmann (1928–2019), American theoretical physicist

== See also ==
- Evin
- Eyvindur
- Eyvindr skáldaspillir, 10th-century Norwegian skald
