= Zinken Hopp =

Norwegian author, poet, playwright

Signe Marie "Zinken" Hopp, née Brochmann (9 January 1905 – 3 September 1987) was a Norwegian writer, poet, playwright. She wrote in several genres: cultural-historical books, poems and travel stories. She translated children's books and was a theater reviewer for Aftenposten from 1947 to 1971. She is best known for writing children's books, especially Trollkrittet (1948).

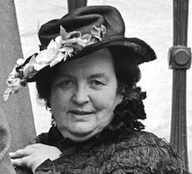
Zinken Hopp

== Biography ==
Signe Marie Brochmann was born in Ullensvang Municipality in Hordaland county, Norway. She came from a literary family. She was a daughter of journalist Diderik Hegermann Brochmann (1879–1955) and Margit Hagen (1896–1962). Her father was a co-founder of the Norwegian Covenant of Governors and the author of both journals and factual literature. She was a sister of professor and children's writer Odd Brochmann (1909–1992), granddaughter of playwright and writer Bodvar Fredrik Johannes Brochmann (1852–1930) and niece of journalist, writer of popular science and playwright Georg Brochmann (1894–1952).

From the 1920s until the 1960s, Zinken delivered popularizing articles, essays, scripts, short stories and poems to newspapers and magazines. From the 1940s, she published a long line of children's and youth books and published several books in which he retold familiar sagas and myths for children and young people. These books include Norwegian Folklore Simplified (1959) and Norwegian History Simplified (1961).

Hopp taught art history at the Arts and Crafts School (Statens høgskole for kunsthåndverk og design) in Bergen. She also worked as a translator and translated Lewis Carroll's Alice in Wonderland into Norwegian.

In 1932 she married broadcasting personality Einar Meidell Hopp (1899–1956). He managed the broadcasting in Bergen for over thirty years. She died during 1987 in Bergen.

== Other sources ==
- Carl Lauritz Lund-Iversen (2005) Zinken en bok om Zinken Hopp (Eide forl) ISBN 9788251406840
