= Ed McLachlan =

British cartoonist (1940–2024)

Edward Rolland McLachlan (22 April 1940 – 29 September 2024) was an English cartoonist and illustrator, mostly producing sketches of a surreal and humorous nature as well as occasional political cartoons. The magazine editor Richard Ingrams described him as "the Leicestershire Charles Addams".

== Biography ==
McLachlan was born in Humberstone, Leicestershire, and studied at Wyggeston Grammar School and Leicester College of Art. Initially he worked for a small printing company, before his cartoons were accepted by Punch magazine. He became a regular contributor to the magazine, and then went freelance in 1965. He contributed regularly to the Sunday Mirror and the Evening Standard, and in the late 1960s worked as a lecturer in graphics at Leicester College of Art.

From 1967 his cartoons appeared regularly in Private Eye, and his work also featured in the Daily Mirror, Sunday Telegraph, The Spectator, The Oldie and many other journals. He also designed advertisements, and wrote and illustrated children's books including Simon in the Land of Chalk Drawings. He illustrated more than 80 books in the Bangers and Mash educational reading series by Paul Groves, made into a television series in 1989, and also illustrated many non-fiction books.

He received many awards, including Illustrative Cartoonist of the Year in 1980 and Advertising Cartoonist of the Year in 1981.

McLachlan died on 29 September 2024, at the age of 84.
