= Øyvind Stene =

Norwegian engineer and businessperson (born 1947)

Øyvind Stene (born 18 November 1947) is a Norwegian engineer and businessperson.

He was born in Førde, and took an education in civil engineering. From 1973 to 2000 he worked mainly as a consultant, including a period in Zambia for the Norwegian Agency for Development Cooperation between 1978 and 1979, and a period as CEO of Blom ASA from 1996 to 1998. From 1998 to 2000 he worked in Kjeld Rimberg & Co. From 2000 to 2006 he served as director of the Norwegian Coastal Administration. Upon the end of his term he became secretary general of the Norwegian Society for Rescue at Sea.

Civic offices
Preceded by Øyvind Gustavsen	Director of the Norwegian Coastal Administration; 2000–2006	Succeeded by Kirsti Slotvik
