= Odd (name) =

Odd, a name of Old Norse origin (Oddr), is the 11th most common male name in Norway. It is rarely used in other countries, though it does occasionally appear in other Nordic countries. In Old Norse, the word means "sharp end of an arrow" or "edge of a blade".

The Icelandic and Faroese form of the name is Oddur.

== Notable people named Odd ==
- Odd Aalen, statistician
- Odd Aukrust, economist
- Odd Børre, singer
- Odd Børretzen, author, illustrator and translator
- Odd Bull, UN official
- Odd Christian Eiking, cyclist
- Odd Roger Enoksen, politician
- Odd Gleditsch, Sr., businessman
- Odd Hassel, chemist and Nobel laureate
- Odd Iversen, footballer
- Odd Lindbäck-Larsen, World War II military officer and concentration camp survivor
- Odd Martinsen, cross-country skier
- Odd Nansen, architect
- Odd Nerdrum, painter
- Odd Nordstoga, musician
- Odd Øyen, resistance member and anaesthetist
- Odd Sagør, politician
- Odd Strand, civil servant
- Odd Arne Westad, historian
- Odd Winger journalist, novelist and children's writer
- Odd With, politician

=== Fictional characters ===
- Odd Della Robbia, a main character in the French 2D/3D animated television series Code Lyoko and its live-action/CGI sequel Code Lyoko: Evolution
- Odd Thomas, the main character in a series of novels by author Dean Koontz

== See also ==
- Even (given name)
