= Ole Vatnan =

Norwegian civil servant (1927–2021)

Ole Carsten Vatnan (20 August 1927 – 28 January 2021) was a Norwegian civil servant.

== Life and career ==
Vatnan was born in Fauske Municipality (located in the Salten region) and graduated with a cand.oecon. degreenin 1952. In 1961, he was hired in the Ministry of Transport and Communications, being promoted to deputy under-secretary of state in 1969. From 1974, he served as director of the newly created Norwegian Coastal Administration. He retired in 1995. Vatnan died on 28 January 2021, at the age of 93.

New post	Director of the Norwegian Coastal Administration; 1974–1995	Succeeded by Øyvind Gustavsen
