= ODD =

ODD is an initialism, which might refer to:

- Oculodentodigital dysplasia (ODD syndrome), an extremely rare genetic condition
- ODD (Text Encoding Initiative) ("One Document Does it all"), an abstracted literate-programming format for describing XML schemas
- Oodnadatta Airport (IATA: ODD), South Australia
- Operational design domain (ODD), for automated systems
- Operational due diligence
- Oppositional defiant disorder, a mental disorder characterized by anger-guided, hostile behavior
  - ODD, a 2007 play by Hal Corley about a teenager with oppositional defiant disorder
- Optical disc drive

== See also ==
- Odd (disambiguation)
