= Øyvind Gustavsen =

Norwegian civil servant (born 1937)

- Born: 1937 (age 88–89)
- Education: Norwegian Institute of Technology
- Occupation: Civil servant
- Known for: Director of the Norwegian Coastal Administration

Øyvind Gustavsen (born 1937) is a Norwegian civil servant.

He took his sivilingeniør education at the Norwegian Institute of Technology. He was appointed director of the Norwegian Coastal Administration in 1995. Formerly he had held many administrative positions, including deputy under-secretary of state in the Ministry of the Environment, sub-director in the Norwegian Coastal Administration, chief administrative officer of Aust-Agder county and CEO of Aust-Agder Trafikkselskap.

In 2000 he resigned, one year before his term ended. Instead, he took a position as an advisor. Leif Jansen was acting director until the appointment of Øyvind Stene.

Preceded by Ole Vatnan	Director of the Norwegian Coastal Administration; 1995–2000	Succeeded by Øyvind Stene
