= Blom =

Blom AS
- Company type: Public
- Industry: Cartography
- Founded: 1954
- Headquarters: Oslo, Norway
- Area served: Europe
- Key people: Dirk Blaauw (CEO); Håkon Jacobsen(Executive Officer and Norwegian engineer)
- Revenue: ▼NOK 335 million (2012)
- Operating income: ▼NOK 1,7 million (2012)
- Net income: ▼NOK -66,6 million (2012)
- Number of employees: 600 (2013)
- Parent: NRC Group
- Website: www.blomasa.com

Blom is a European service provider within acquisition, processing and modelling of geographical information. Blom maintains European databases with collections of map, images and models. With particular focus on online services, Blom provides data and services to customers in government, enterprise and consumer markets and enables partners to create applications using Blom’s databases, location-based services and navigation systems. Blom has more than 600 employees and subsidiaries in 10 countries. The company headquarters is in Oslo, Norway. The parent company NRC Group is listed on the Oslo Stock Exchange (OSE: NRC).

== History ==
Blom ASA was founded in 1954 by hydrographer Ole H. Blom. By 1988 the company was listed on Oslo Stock Exchange.

In 2015, the company merged with Team Bane and Svensk Järnvägsteknik to create NRC Group, making Blom a subsidiary of the new company.

== Operations ==
The primary business areas are [[aerial photography]], laser scanning (LiDAR), mapping and modelling, databases and database applications, GIS services and online map services (BlomURBEX).

Blom uses large format cameras mounted in twin-engined fixed-winged aircraft or rotor wing helicopters assisted by Global Positioning System (GPS) with Inertial Measurement Units (IMU) to perform oblique and vertical aerial photography. In addition, the company capture map data using survey cameras, laser scanners (LiDAR) and Hyperspectral scanners.

Blom maintains a large database of oblique and vertical aerial photography, laser data, map models such as 3D city models, digital surface models and digital terrain models, and digital orthophoto images .
