= Øyvind Staveland =

Norwegian musician

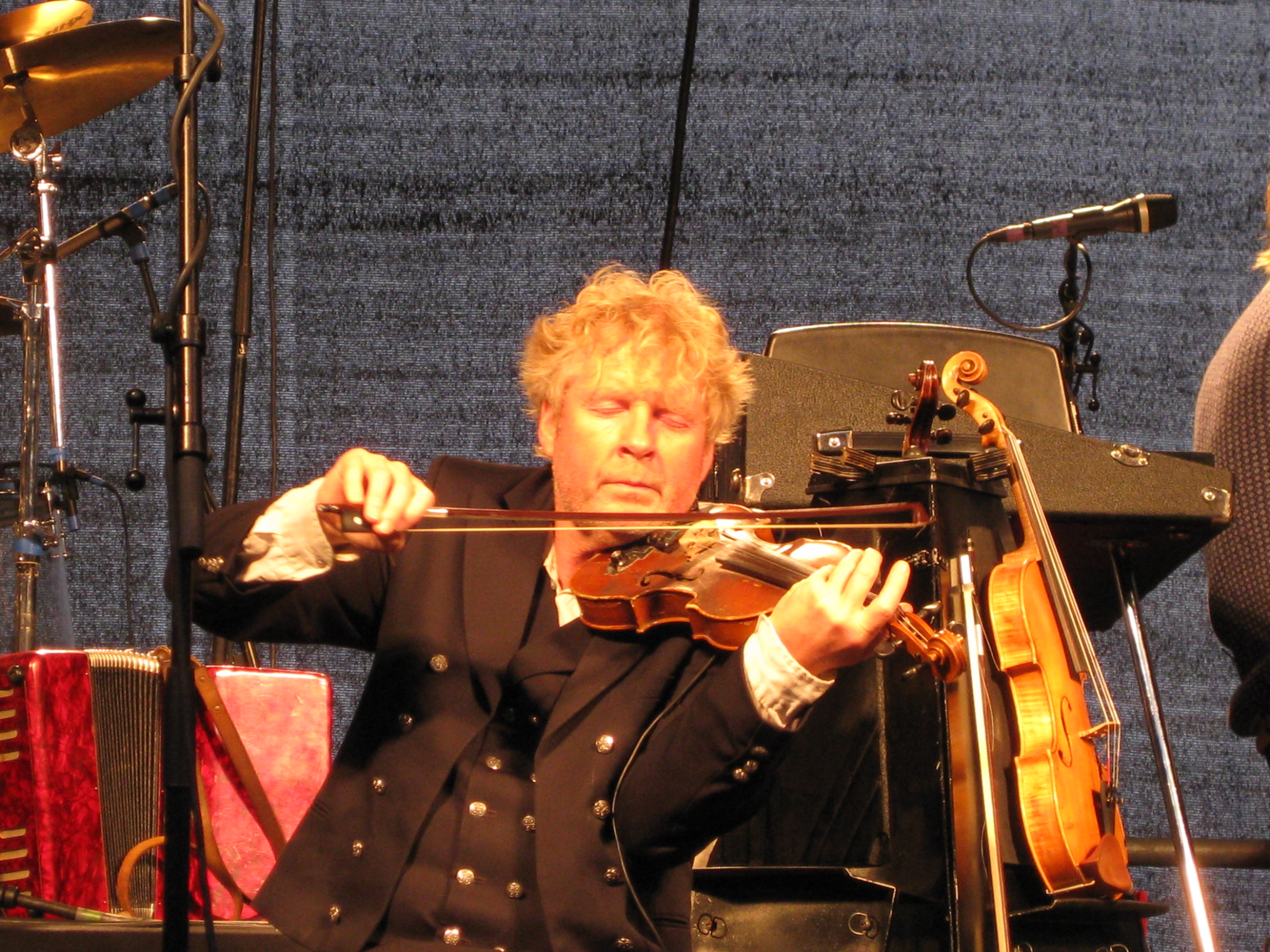
Øyvind Staveland in concert with Vamp on Lindesnes.

Øyvind Staveland (born May 20, 1960) was the founder of the Norwegian band Vamp together with Torbjørn Økland in 1991.

Staveland has composed the music for the majority of Vamp's hits throughout the years including "Tir n'a noir", "Harry", "Sitte å tenke", "Ba", "Månemannen" and "Kim du nå va" (also lyrics for the latter). He has closely worked with his neighbor, the poet Kolbein Falkeid for the lyrics to Vamp song.

His son Odin Aarvik Staveland has written the music amongst others to The Color of Milk (original title Ikke naken also known as Neither Naked nor Dressed).

As a musician, He has experience playing the violin, viola, accordion, and flute in addition to vocals.

Before being involved in music, he was working as a carpenter.
