= Diphenol =

Diphenol may refer to:

- Benzenediols
- Bisphenols
- Dihydroxybiphenyls
- Various polyphenols (those with 2 phenolic groups)
