= Einar Meidell Hopp =

Einar Meidell Hopp (1 December 1899 – 18 May 1956) was a Norwegian broadcasting personality.

He was born in Bergen, a son of Kristian Hopp and Anna Christine Meidell. He was the brother of Egil Meidell Hopp. He married Zinken Hopp in 1932. He managed the broadcasting in Bergen over a period of thirty years, interrupted by World War II, when he served in the Norwegian Armed Forces in exile.
