= Øivind Tomteberget =

Norwegian footballer (born 1953)

Øivind Tomteberget (born 4 August 1953, in Kongsvinger) is a retired Norwegian football midfielder.

Tomteberget played for his local club Kongsvinger IL until 1977, but joined Lillestrøm SK ahead of the 1978 season. He only spent one season at Lillestrøm, and returned to Kongsvinger in 1979, helping KIL achieve promotion to the Norwegian Premier League for the first time in the club's history in 1982.

In 1983, Tomteberget was called up to the national team, making his international debut in a match against Finland on 15 June 1983. In total, he won four caps for Norway. Between 1983 and late 1988, he missed only two Premier League games. In total he played 660 games (cup matches and friendlies included) for Kongsvinger, a club record.
