= Øivind Larsen =

Norwegian historian and physician

Øivind Larsen (born 6 September 1938) is a Norwegian physician and professor emeritus of history of medicine at the University of Oslo. He became a docent (reader) in medical history in 1971 and was promoted to Professor in 1985. He is currently chairman of the Norwegian Medical Society (Det norske medicinske Selskab; not to be confused with the Norwegian Medical Association).

He received the dr.med. (D.Sc.) degree at the University of Oslo in 1968. His dissertation, titled Schiff und Seuche 1795–1799. Ein medizinischer Beitrag zur historischen Kenntnis der Gesundheitsverhältnisse an Bord dänisch-norwegischer Kriegsschiffe auf den Fahrten nach Dänisch-Westindien was a study of the health conditions aboard Dano-Norwegian naval vessels bound for the Danish West Indies in the 1790s.
