= Øyvind Thorsen =

Norwegian writer (1943–2025)

- Born: 11 June 1943; Tønsberg, German-occupied Norway
- Died: 4 May 2025 (aged 81); Oslo, Norway
- Occupations: Journalist, revue writer, screenwriter, book writer

Øyvind Thorsen (11 June 1943 – 4 May 2025) was a Norwegian journalist, causerist, revue writer, scriptwriter and author of humour books.

== Life and career ==
Born in Tønsberg on 11 June 1943, Thorsen grew up in Nøtterøy, and later settled in Oslo.

He worked as journalist for the newspaper Vestfold Arbeiderblad from 1965, and for Aftenposten from 1968 to 1984, and thereafter as freelancer. He was a columnist for Aftenposten for several decades, under the signature Vito. He was also known for his radio causeries, including for the radio show Nitimen and the column Morgenkåseriet.

He delivered material for several revue artists, including Arve Opsahl, Leif Juster, Aud Schønemann, and the Dizzie Tunes. He wrote a number of humorous books, a total of 19 books, issued seven albums, and was screenwriter for two Olsen Gang films.

Thorsen died in Oslo on 4 May 2025, at the age of 81.
