= Kristian Garup Meidell =

Norwegian lawyer

- Born: 8 May 1866; Nes i Hallingdal, Norway
- Died: 25 July 1926 (aged 60); Modum Bad, Norway
- Education: Royal Frederick University (cand. it.)
- Occupation: Barrister
- Board member of: Norwegian Bar Association
- Spouse: Kristine Marie Birkeland
- Children: Arne Meidell; Frants Meidell
- Parents: Frants Henrik Meidell (father); Olivia Annette Caroline Arntzen (mother)
- Relatives: Laurits Birkeland (Grandfather)
External image
- Portrait of Garup Meidell, c.1920, Oslo Museum

Kristian Garup Meidell, sometimes just Garup Meidell (8 May 1866 – 25 July 1926) was a Norwegian barrister.

He was born in Nes i Hallingdal as a son of district stipendiary magistrate Frants Henrik Meidell and Olivia Annette Caroline Arntzen. In 1893 he married Kristine Marie Birkeland, a daughter of Supreme Court Justice Laurits Birkeland. Their son Arne Meidell became a known industrial leader. Another son, Frants, followed in his father's footsteps as a barrister.

Garup Meidell graduated from the Royal Frederick University with the cand.jur. degree in 1890. He worked under his father before settling as an attorney in Kristiania (Oslo) in 1893. From 1896 he was a barrister with access to working with Supreme Court cases. Among others he worked as a lawyer for the Central Bank of Norway, and at his death he was described as one of the "best known jurists" in Norway's capital.

He took part in the liquidation of Den norske Discontobank in 1901 and Industribanken in 1902. He was also appointed by the state to the control committee of Andresens og Bergens Kreditbank, when the bank was placed under public administration in 1923. He chaired the supervisory council of Elektrisk Bureau, and was a board member of the Norwegian Bar Association. He died in July 1926 at Modum Bad.
