= Øyvind Asbjørnsen =

Norwegian filmmaker

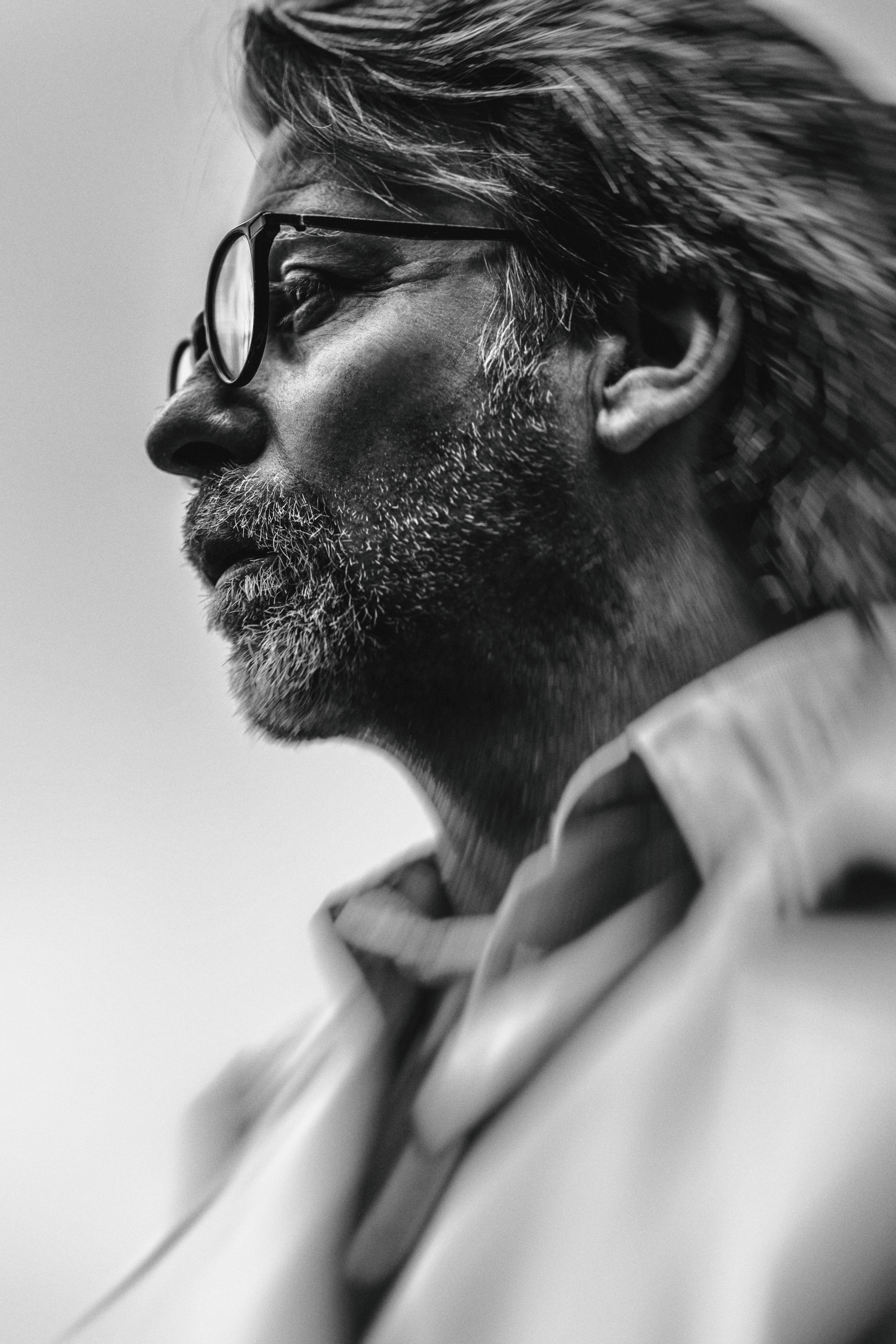
- Born: Øyvind VonDoren Asbjørnsen; November 28, 1963 (age 62); Köping, Sweden

Øyvind VonDoren Asbjørnsen (born 28 November 1963) is a Norwegian film producer, director, entrepreneur and watchmaker.

He has made several documentaries, TV-series and short films. One of his most notable work was The Prince of Chess, a 2005 full-length documentary about 13-year-old chess prodigy Magnus Carlsen. He is the Executive Producer and cinematographer of the feature documentary MAGNUS who world premiered at Tribecca Film Festival in April 2016. Øyvind Asbjørnsen has since the early 90s used the pseudonym Asa Von Doren in many of his films. in 2016 he also changed his name to include Von Doren as his middle name. He graduated from London Film School in 1987.

He has also written a few screenplays, and books such as George the green boy and Words of wisdom.

Asbjørnsen founded and was publisher-in-chief of Fritt Forlag. He is also the head of the production company Main Island Production. From September 2013 to September 2016 Asbjørnsen worked as publisher-in-chief at NKI Forlaget. Von Doren Asbjornsen is the founder of the independent watch company Von Doren Watch Company AS
