= Arne Meidell =

Norwegian jurist and businessperson

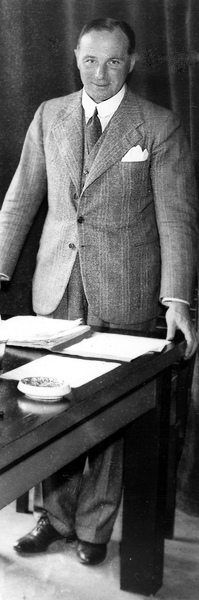
Arne Meidell.

Arne Meidell (17 November 1894 – 8 August 1963) was a Norwegian jurist and businessperson.

He was born in Kristiania as a son of barrister Kristian Garup Meidell (1866–1926) and Kristine Marie Birkeland (1871–1958). He was a maternal grandson of Supreme Court Justice Laurits Birkeland. In 1918 he married Danish pharmacist's daughter Asta Trojel (1896–1984).

He finished his education at Frogner School in 1912, and graduated from the Royal Frederick University with the cand.jur. degree in 1916. After graduation, he was a junior solicitor, then from 1925 a barrister with access to Supreme Court cases. By then he had already become a business leader. In 1922 he was hired as manager of Lilleborg Fabriker, advancing to chief executive officer in 1929. In 1933 he was hired as chief executive (director-general) in Borregaard, where he remained until 1960.

He also chaired the board of Borregaard and Norges Eksportråd, was a board member of De-No-Fa from 1925 to 1933, Lade Fabriker from 1926 to 1933, Andresens og Bergens Kreditbank from 1928 to 1933, as well as Sulitjelma Gruber from 1937, Norsk Cellullfabrikk, Folldal Verk, and supervisory council member of Forsikringsaktieselskabet Norden and Norges Hypotekforening for Næringslivet. He was a member of the skiing-based social club SK Fram, and served as deputy chairman from 1959 to 1960 and chairman from 1960 to 1963. He was a vice president of the Norwegian Red Cross, and in the 1930s he was a member of the council of Norges Forsvarsforening. He also served as a consul for Denmark from 1928 to 1933.

He was decorated as a Knight of the Order of the Dannebrog, the Order of Vasa, the Order of the White Rose of Finland and the Austrian Order of Merit, as well as a Commander with Star of the Order of St. Olav. A road has been named after him in Sarpsborg, and a bust of Meidell was unveiled in the same city in 1964.
