= The Magic Chalk =

1949 nonsensical children's novel by Zinken Hopp

1954 edition (publ. Tidens Förlag) Illustrated by Malvin Neset

The Magic Chalk (Norwegian: Trollkrittet) is a nonsensical children's novel written by Norwegian author Zinken Hopp in 1948. The novel has a slightly satirical tone and includes puzzles and poems.

== Plot summary ==
A boy named Jon finds a piece of chalk, dropped by a witch, and uses it to draw a stick man on a fence, not knowing that it is magic. The stick man becomes alive and says his name is Sofus. Jon draws a door and together they enter a garden full of talking animals, some of whom they help out using the magic chalk. After being bothered by a pedagogic owl and doing some absurd mathematical problems, they leave and soon descend into a cave, wherein they meet a crocodile and a tiger, but the boys clear up alive. When they had come out from the other end of the cave, they find the house of a little old lady who serves them cookies shaped like animals, one for each letter of the alphabet. After talking to the animals - which can only say words that begin with their letter, they leave the grandmother.

After walking for a while, they encounter Kumle, a friendly troll. He offers to trade three wishes per person for the chalk, so Sofus asks for a violin, a wallet that always has money, and candy that makes one grow grass instead of hair; Jon wishes for Sofus to be waterproof and for candy that works as an antidote to Sofus's, saving the third wish for later. Their wishes are granted and they agree to meet again.

They enter a kingdom and Sofus decides to go to the castle. He charms the king, queen, and princess with his violin playing and claims to be rich, showing them his wallet as proof. The princess steals the wallet and the violin, and as a revenge, Sofus gives her and her parents his candy. Once the grass starts growing, the king attempts to imprison them, but they escape successfully.

The public assumes that the royal family's grass is a type of hat and it becomes a fad, but as Autumn comes, the grass begins to wilt. Jon and Sofus go to the castle, and Jon gives the royal family his candy. The grass starts turning back into hair, but before it's done, Jon takes Sofus by the hand and asks for his third wish: to go back home. They immediately appear in his kitchen, where his mother is making dinner, and they tell her about everything that's happened to them.

== Reception ==
BETTY MILES, of the Bank Street College of Education found the illustrations "appropriately dashing yet tenuous" and that "the hither-thither situations are set with typographical abandon". Kirkus Reviews describes it as "A delightful patchwork of fancy, puzzles, poetry, and nonsense..." that "At every step the reader's visual sense is challenged" and saw it as "an inventive world peopled with characters ... designed to consistently amuse and surprise."

== Sequel ==
A sequel for The Magic Chalk was published, named Jon and Sofus, which tells more of their adventures in the castle. In it, Kumle becomes a newspaper editor and publishes nonsensical articles and photographs, which parody the newspapers of the time.
