= Torbjørn Økland =

Norwegian musician (born 1964)

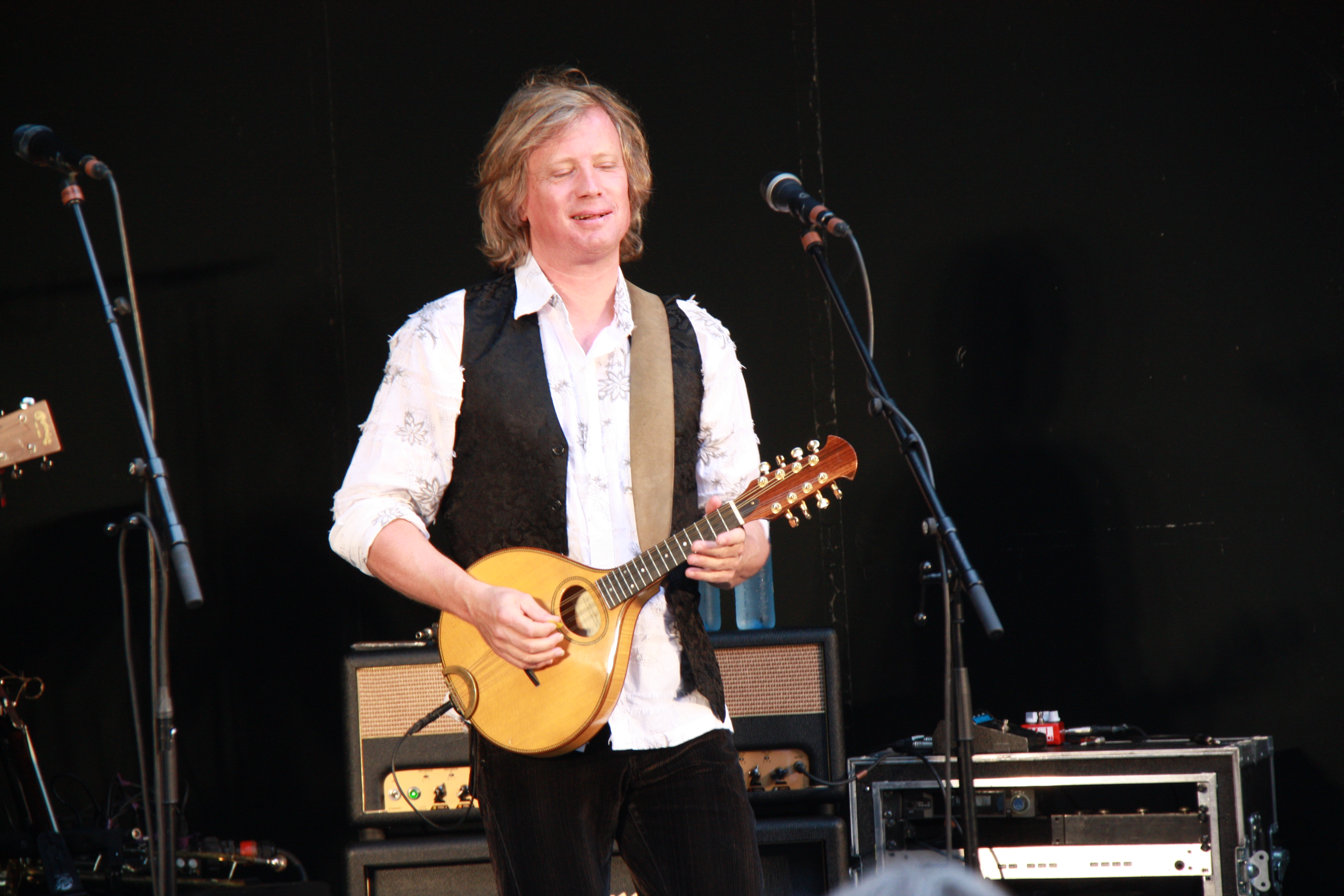
Torbjørn Økland in concert in Søgne 2011

Torbjørn Eirik Økland (born 25 December 1964) is a Norwegian musician. Together with Øyvind Staveland he was the founder of the Norwegian band Vamp.

Økland is also a studio musician for a number of well-known Norwegian artists.

He is also a member of the folk-inspired group Streif.
