= Even Tudeberg =

Estonian biathlete and sport personnel (born 1963)

Even Tudeberg (born 14 January 1963 in Tallinn) is an Estonian biathlete and sport personnel.

In 1988 he graduated from Tallinn Pedagogical Institute in physical education.

In 1983 he won bronze medal at Biathlon Junior World Championships.

1981-1986 he became 3-times Estonian champion in biathlon and cross-country skiing.

2000–2002 he was the president of Estonian Biathlon Federation.
