= Carl Øyvind Apeland =

Norwegian musician

Carl Øyvind Apeland (also known as Calle Apeland), born April 18, 1964, is a Norwegian musician who plays bass, guitar, and keyboard in the Norwegian band Vamp.

He has composed some of the band's hits like "Sommar i hekken". He also co-wrote "Ingeborg" (with Jan Toft another band member), "Sirkus av lys", "Byen" and "Svin på skog" (with Odin Aarvik Staveland).
