= Øyvind Alfred Stensrud =

Norwegian politician

Øyvind Alfred Stensrud (2 April 1887 – 28 October 1956) was a Norwegian politician for the Liberal Party.

He served as a deputy representative to the Norwegian Parliament from the Market towns of Telemark and Aust-Agder counties and later Telemark during the terms 1945–1949, 1950–1953 and 1954–1957.
