= Vamp (band) =

Norwegian folk rock band

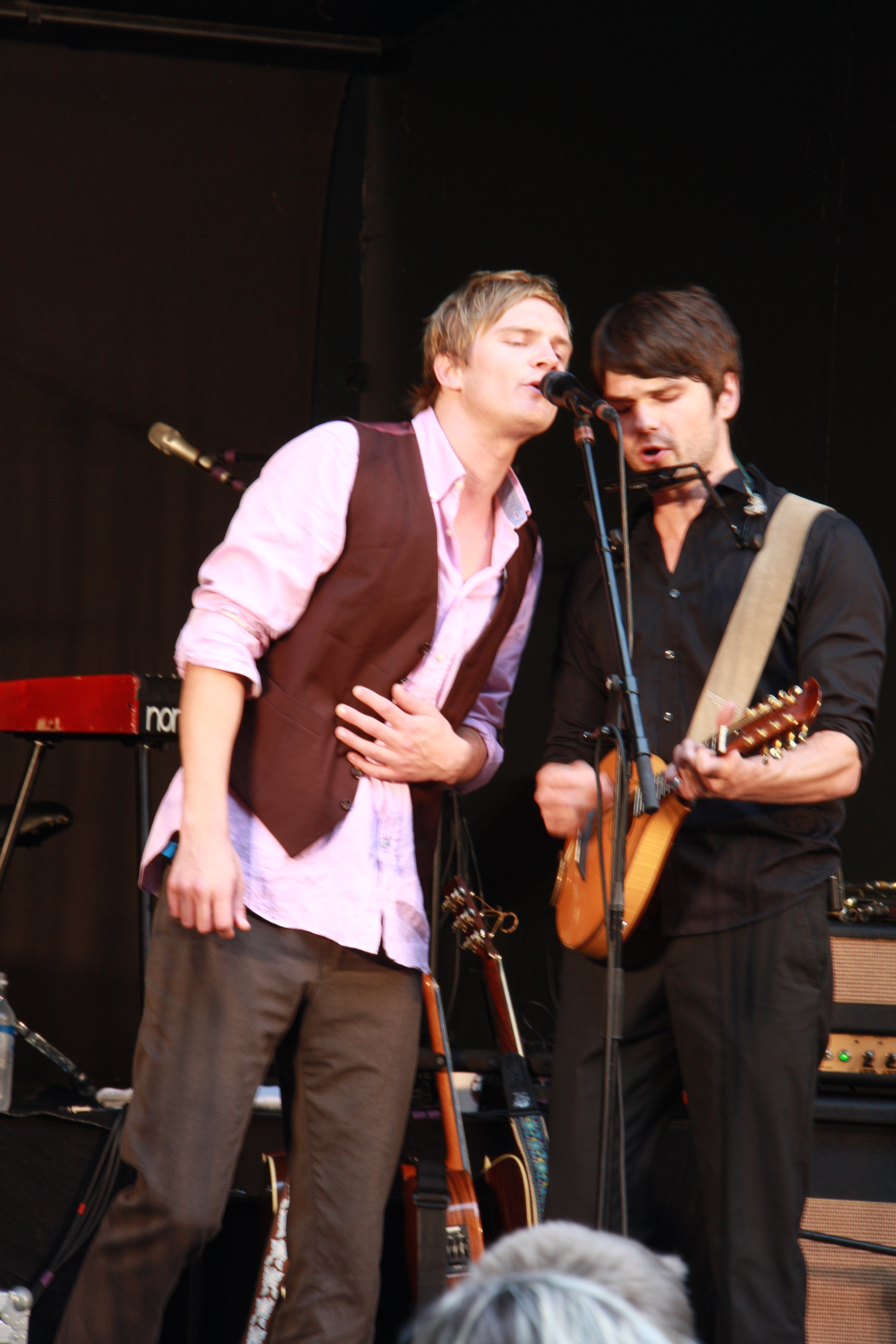
- Odin Staveland and Paul Hansen live with Vamp in 2011.

Background information
- Origin: Haugesund, Norway
- Genres: Folk; folk rock
- Years active: 1990–present
- Label: Universal Music
- Members: Øyvind Staveland – violin, viola, accordion, flute, vocals Odin Staveland – keyboard, drums, guitar, vocals Jan Toft – vocals, guitar Bjørn Berge – guitar, vocals Kjetil Dalland - bass Lars Eirik Støle - keys
- Past members: Torbjørn Økland - guitar, mandolin, bouzoki, trumpet, backing vocals Calle Øyvind Apeland – bass, keyboards, guitar, vocals Paul Hansen – vocals, guitar, harmonica Erling Sande – drums, percussion Cliffie Grinde – drums, percussion, backing vocals Vidar Johnsen – vocals, guitar, keyboards, percussion Birger Mistereggen – drums, percussion, harmonica Tore Jamne – drums, percussion
- Website: Official website

Vamp (initiated in 1990) is a folk-rock band from Haugesund, Norway with founding members Øyvind Staveland, Calle Øyvind Apeland, Paul Hansen, Bjørn Berge, Odin Staveland and Tore Jamne. The band's musical profile is a mix of Norwegian traditional folk music combined with rock.

== Biography ==
Vamp have released 11 studio albums, collected ten gold records, three platinum records, two triple platinum and been awarded Spellemannprisen five times. After the success of I full symfoni, which is a live album from concerts with Kringkastingsorkesteret, they were named the Spellemann of the Year at the Spellemannprisen award in 2006.

They have a large and loyal fan base in power of both their music and the Norwegian lyrics. Most of the lyrics are written by Norwegian poets and writers. Most notable of their lyrical collaborators are Kolbein Falkeid, whom they have worked with throughout his career. Falkeid has written the bulk of the lyrics on the first three albums, and his texts have been used in all the other albums as well. Another important contributor to text page is Arnt Birkedal who has contributed lyrics to most of the albums, as well as Ingvar Hovland, who has been the main contributor on the last two albums. Most of the music is written by Øyvind Staveland and at the beginning of their career Jan Toft contributed lyrics.

In 2014 Bjørn Berge replaced Torbjørn Økland as guitarist in the band.

== Members ==
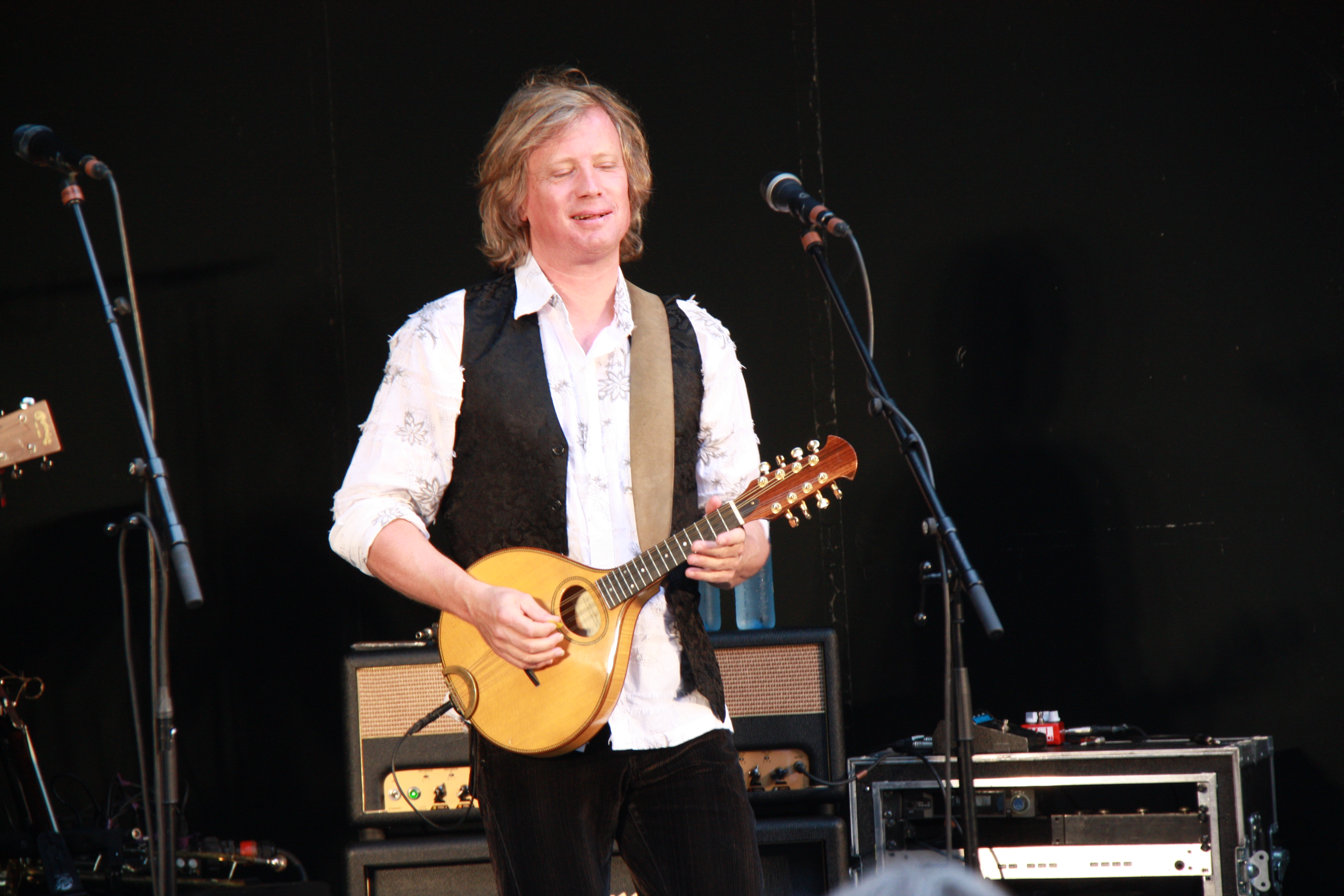
Torbjørn Økland from a concert in Søgne Municipality 2011

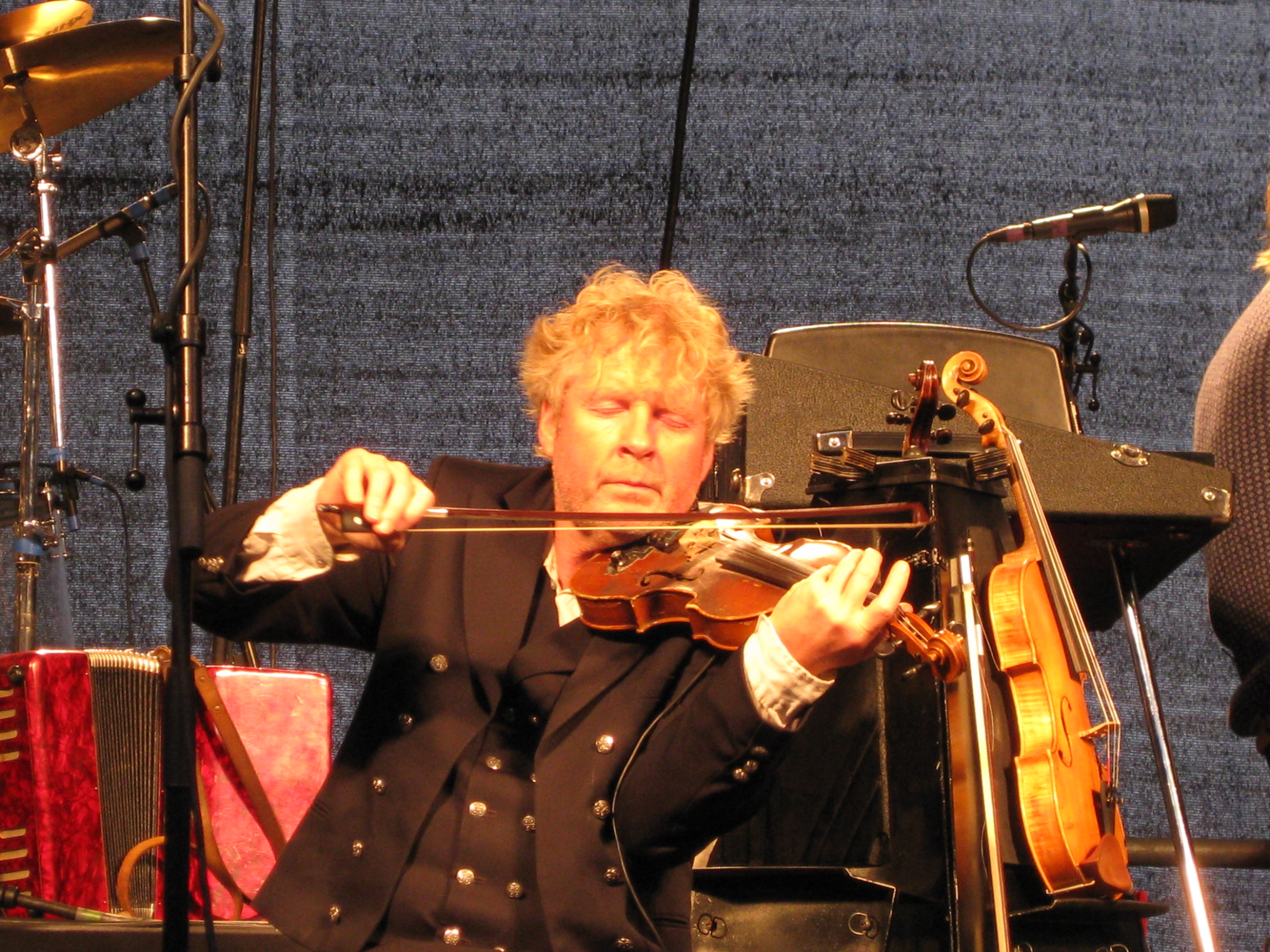
Øyvind Staveland from concert with Vamp in Lindesnes Municipality

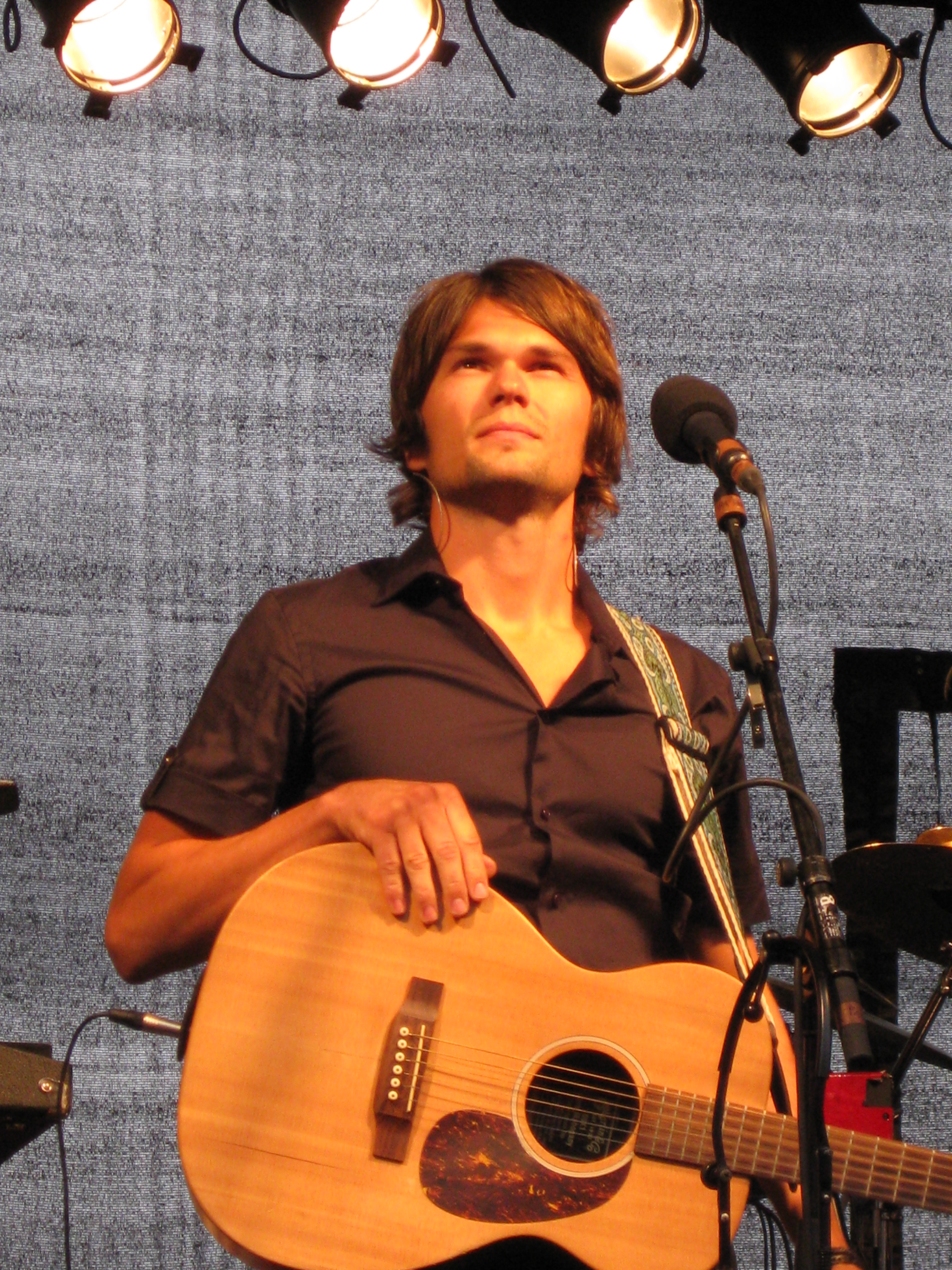
Paul Hansen from concert with Vamp in 2009

Permanent members

- Øyvind Staveland (born 20 May 1960) – violin, viola, accordion, flute, vocals (1990 – current)

Joining members

- Odin Staveland – drums, vocals, keys – (2008 – current)
- Jan Toft – vocals, guitar (1991–1998, 2014- current)
- Kjetil Dalland – bass (2014 - current)
- Lars Eirik Støle - keys (2015 - current)

Former members

- Stian Tønnesen – guitar (2019 – 2022)
- Bjørn Berge – guitar, vocals (2014 – 2019)
- Carl Øyvind Apeland (Calle Øyvind Apeland) (born 18 April 1964) – bass, keyboards, guitar, backing vocals (1990 – 2014)
- Torbjørn Økland – guitar, mandolin, bouzouki, trumpet, chorus (1990 – 2014)
- Paul Hansen – vocals, guitar, harmonica (2008 – 2014)
- Tore Jamne – drums, percussion (1998–2005, 2010 – 2014)
- Erling Sande – drums, percussion (1990–1995)
- Cliffie Grinde – drums, percussion (1995–1998)
- Vidar Johnsen – vocals, guitar, keyboards, percussion (2002–2006)
- Birger Mistereggen – drums, percussion, harmonica (2008–2009)

== Discography ==
=== Albums ===
Year	Album	Peak position	Certification
Year	Album	NOR	Certification
1993	Godmorgen, søster	16	
1994	Horisonter	6	
1996	13 humler	5	
1998	Flua på veggen	5	
1999	Ei med alt	10	
2000	En annen sol	3	
2002	Månemannen	2	
2005	Siste stikk	1	
2008	St. Mandag	1	
2012	Liten fuggel	1	
2013	To me alt	1	
2015	Populas	1	
2017	La La La	21	
2019	Brev		
2021	Tiå det Tar		

Live albums

Year	Album	Peak position	Certification
Year	Album	NOR	Certification
1996	Live – på Folken	20	

Collaborations

Year	Album	Peak position	Certification
Year	Album	NOR	Certification
2006	Vamp i full symfoni with Kringkastingsorkestret	1	
2010	Vamp i full symfoni II	1	
2025	Vamp i full symfoni III		

Compilation albums

Year	Album	Peak position	Certification
Year	Album	NOR	Certification
1999	Ei med alt	10	
2013	To me alt	1	

=== Singles ===
Charting

Year	Title	Peak position	Certification	Album
Year	Title	NOR	Certification	Album
2006	"Tir n'a noir"	3		
2006	Månemannen	17		
2008	"På bredden"	6		
2012	"Liten fuggel"	6		
2017	"Onkel Holger"			

Awards
Preceded by Madrugada	Recipient of the Spellemannprisen as This year's Spellemann; 2006	Succeeded by Hellbillies
