= Fredrikstad/Sarpsborg =

Urban area in Norway

Coordinates: 59°13′N 10°59′E

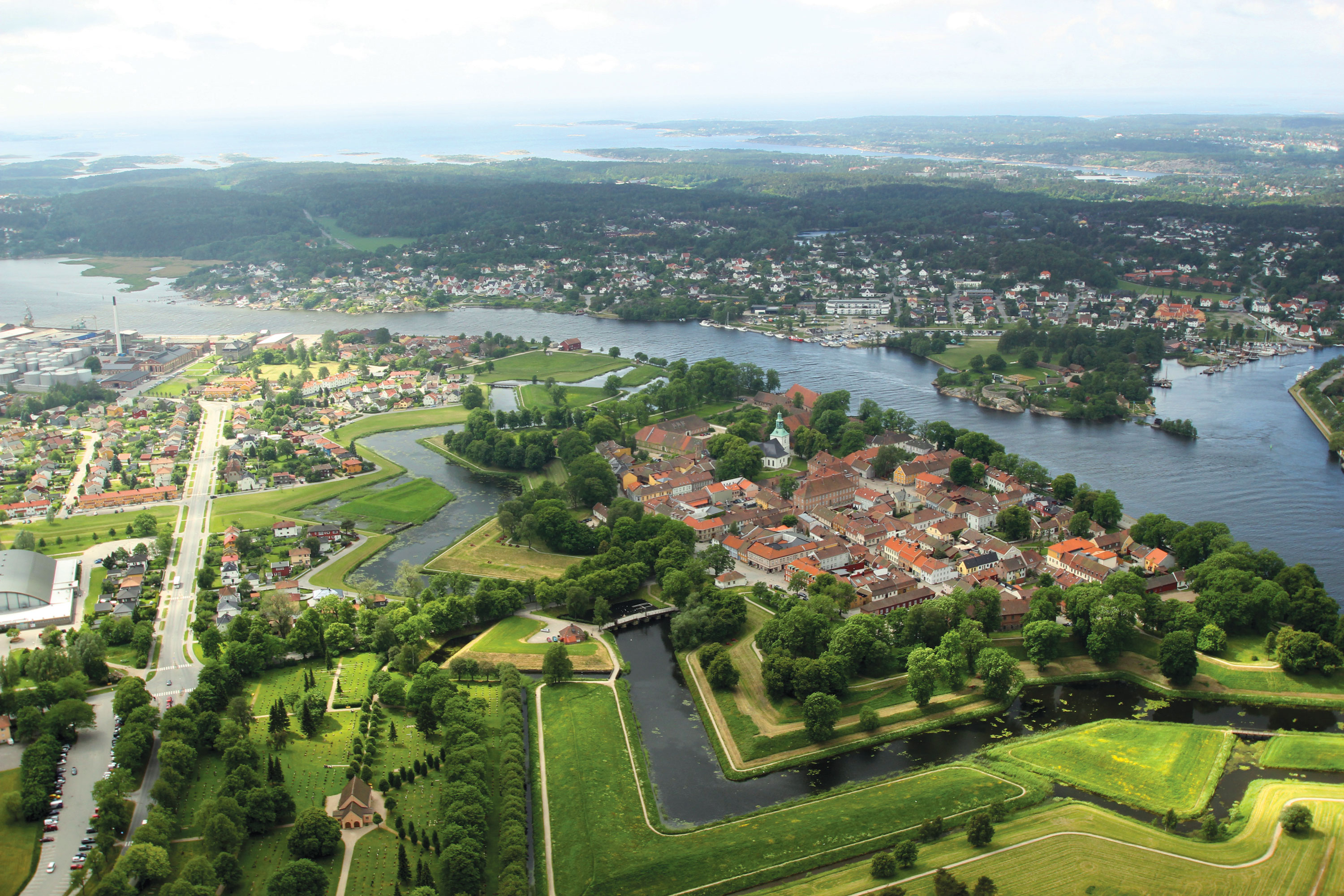
Old town Fredrikstad

Fredrikstad/Sarpsborg is an urban area in Norway consisting of the twin cities Sarpsborg and Fredrikstad, in addition to several smaller towns in between and on the outside of the core of the cities.

The development of the region has progressed so far that Fredrikstad/Sarpsborg now is considered one urban area. Fredrikstad/Sarpsborg is Norway's seventh largest urban area, with a population of 101,698 as of January 2009, of which 42,803 reside in Sarpsborg and 58,895 reside in Fredrikstad.
