= Folque =

Norwegian musical group

Folque is a Norwegian folk rock band.

It was founded in 1973 by Morten Bing, Jørn Jensen, Eilif Amundsen, Lisa Helljesen, Espen Løvstad, Trond Øverland, and Trond Villa. In 1972 a subset of the band was initially named «Brød & Vin» (Bread & wine), they changed the name to Folque in the spring of 1973 after adding members and traditional instruments to the ensemble.

Having a lineup of Bing, Amundsen, Helljesen and Villa on the records Kjempene på Dovrefjell (1975) and Vardøger (1977), Folque saw a lineup change. Jenn Mortensen took over as singer and Øyvind Rauset on violin for the fourth album Dans, dans Olav Liljekrans (1978). This fourth album mainly contained medieval ballads such as the title track "Olav Liljekrans", but also two new songs written by Jack Berntsen and a navvy tune.

For Kjempene på Dovrefjell, Folque was nominated for the Spellemann Award, but Prudence won.

The band dissolved in 1984, but later reunited in 1994 and 2004. Folque is re-established in 2014 with Lisa Helljesen as lead singer. Debut album Folque was re-released in 2016.

Their musical style is linked to Malicorne in France and to Steeleye Span in the UK.

== Discography ==
- Folque (1974)
- Kjempene på Dovrefjell (1975)
- Vardøger (1977)
- Dans, dans Olav Liljekrans (1978)
- Folques beste (1979)
- Fredløs (1980)
- Landet ditt (1981)
- Sort messe (1983)
- Dans dans (1991)
- Stormkast (1998)

== See also ==
- Folk och Rackare
