= Oddur =

Oddur or Oddr is an Icelandic given name that may refer to

- Oddur Gottskálksson (c. 1514–1556), Icelandic translator
- Oddur Olafson (1888–1972), Canadian politician
- Oddur Pétursson (born 1931), Icelandic cross-country skier
- Oddur Sigurðsson (born 1959), Icelandic Olympic sprinter
- Odd Snorrason, 12th century Icelandic author
- Guðmundur Oddur Magnússon (born 1955), Icelandic artist
