= Øyvind Ellingsen =

Norwegian doctor and professor

- Known for: Exercise in Medicine
- Scientific career
- Fields: Cardiology
- Workplaces: Department of Circulation and Medical Imaging, NTNU

Øyvind Ellingsen (born 1952) is a Norwegian Professor of Cellular Cardiology at the Norwegian University of Science and Technology (NTNU), a Consultant Physician at the Department of Cardiology, St. Olavs Hospital, Trondheim, Norway, and is currently Head of the Department of Circulation and Medical Imaging. He received his MD and PhD at the University of Oslo, Norway, and had a postdoctoral fellowship at Harvard University, Massachusetts, U.S.A.

Dr. Ellingsen founded the Laboratory of Cellular Cardiology at NTNU in 1996. The focus of the lab is Exercise in Medicine. Its long-term goals are to understand the mechanisms of the beneficial effects of exercise in cardiovascular disease, to translate them into better programs for prevention and rehabilitation, and to identify new targets for medical therapy.

He currently participates in the HUNT-3 survey of physical activity, aerobic capacity, and endothelial function in Nord-Trøndelag County, Norway, is the Principal Investigator and Steering Committee Chairperson of the SMARTEX-HF multicenter trial and is a collaborating partner of Cardiac Exercise Research Group (CERG). He has been involved in scientific research on biomedical effects of meditation since 2006.

Since 2008 he has been a member of the Royal Norwegian Society of Sciences and Letters.
