= Egil Meidell Hopp =

Norwegian journalist and intelligence agent

Egil Meidell Hopp (6 October 1898 – 9 November 1972) was a Norwegian journalist and intelligence agent.

He was born in Bergen, a son of Kristian Hopp and Anna Christine Meidell. He was a brother of Einar Meidell Hopp. He finished his secondary education at Bergen Cathedral School in 1916, studied one year at the Norwegian Military Academy, later initiated law studies, graduated as cand.jur. in 1923. He worked as a lawyer until 1928, when he started his career as journalist. He worked as journalist for the newspapers Morgenbladet and Aftenposten, and for the Norwegian News Agency. During the German occupation of Norway he was an undercover intelligence agent, active from 1940 to March 1945, with the cover name "Truls".
