= Eyvindur =

Eyvindur is an Icelandic-language variant of the given name Eyvind. Notable people with the name include:

- Fjalla-Eyvindur (1714–1783), Icelandic outlaw
- Eyvindur P. Eiríksson (born 1935), Icelandic writer
