= Even Ulving =

Norwegian painter (1863–1952)

- Born: Even Kristoffersen; 15 August 1863; Vega, Norway
- Died: 3 August 1952 (aged 88); Åsgårdstrand
- Occupation: Painter

Even Ulving (né Kristoffersen; 15 August 1863 – 3 August 1952) was a Norwegian painter.

== Personal life ==
Ulving was born on 15 August 1863 in Vega Municipality, to Christopher Evensen and Olava Larsdatter. He was married to Frederikke Johanne Knoff Quale.

== Career ==
Ulving studied with Knud Bergslien in Kristiania from 1883 to 1884. He studied at the Academy of Fine Arts, Munich under Heinz Heim and Karl Fr. Smith from 1885 to 1886, and at the Académie Julian in Paris under William-Adolphe Bouguereau in 1887.

From 1893 to 1913, Ulving was settled and worked in Helgeland where he painted motives from Nordland. He also painted altarpieces for seven churches in the region. He is represented in the Norwegian National Museum of Art, Architecture and Design with two paintings, Fra Nettuno (1906) and Interiør. Victoria ved pianoet (1909). The model (girl) Victoria is the daughter of writer and later Nobel laureate Knut Hamsun. Other works include Rensdyrflokk skal over fjorden (1906, in the Royal Palace, Oslo). From 1914 Ulving settled in Åsgårdstrand. He painted landscape motives from Sørlandet, Hvaler, Vestfold, and Telemark. He also painted pictures with motives from Italy, such as from Florence, Verona, Rome, Naples and Lake Garda.

Ulving died in Åsgårdstrand on 3 August 1952.
