= Birger Meidell =

Birger Øivind Meidell (4 February 1882 – 29 January 1958) was a professor and a member of The Norwegian Science Academy who served two posts in the fascist NS government of Vidkun Quisling first as Church and Educational Minister and then as Norwegian minister for social affairs September 1940 - September 1941.

He was employed as an actuary at the insurance company Livsforsikringsselskapet Norske Liv in 1907 and in Norway's Government Pension Fund from 1913. He was the director of the Oslo Municipal Pension Fund from 1917 to 1924 and was from 1923 a professor of actuarial science at the Det Kongelige Frederiks Universitet (University of Oslo). He was elected a member of the Norwegian Academy of Science and Letters in 1923. He was an Invited Speaker at the ICM in 1928 in Bologna and in 1936 in Oslo.

After the Second World War he was sentenced to life imprisonment with forced labour but immediately released on grounds of ill health. He took up a post at the company Norges Brannkasse until his retirement.

In the 1930s he formulated a broad strategy for Nazi NS-command of Norwegian society. His main ambition idea was to win over the workers for the NS and for national socialism through active social politics, higher payment, and better working conditions. He also aimed to subordinate the labour unions to government policy. His progress in these aims and throughout his fascist career was not helped by his obstinate and uncooperative personality. He also fielded as a minor ballot candidate for Nasjonal Samling in the 1936 Norwegian parliamentary election in Akershus, but his party did not win a seat.

== Selected publications ==
- "Note sur quelques inégalités et formules d'approximation." Scandinavian Actuarial Journal 1918, no. 1 (1918): 180–198. doi:10.1080/03461238.1918.10405308
- "Randbemerkungen über den Verlauf der Deckungskapitalien; ihre differentialgleichungen und gewisse ihnen angeknüpfte Identitäten." Scandinavian Actuarial Journal 1921, no. 1 (1921): 210–229. doi:10.1080/03461238.1921.10405337
- "Sur un problème fondamental de la statistique mathématique." Scandinavian Actuarial Journal 1922, no. 1 (1922): 210–216. doi:10.1080/03461238.1922.10405359
- "Les fonctions symétriques et les inégalités générales." Scandinavian Actuarial Journal 1928, no. 1 (1928): 201–219. doi:10.1080/03461238.1928.10416878
- "On damping effects and approach to equilibrium in certain general phenomena." Journal of the Washington Academy of Sciences 18, no. 16 (1928): 437–455. JSTOR 24523525
- "Betrachtungen über den effektiven Zinsfuss bei Anleihen." Scandinavian Actuarial Journal 1932, no. 3 (1932): 159–174. doi:10.1080/03461238.1932.10405882
- "Zur theorie und Praxis der Berechnung des effektiven Zinsfusses bei Anleihen." Scandinavian Actuarial Journal 1939, no. 1 (1939): 122–151. doi:10.1080/03461238.1939.10419261
