= Øyvind S. Bruland =

Norwegian oncologist

- Born: December 14, 1955 (age 69)
- Known for: Oncologist

Øyvind Sverre Bruland (born 14 December 1952) is a professor of Clinical Oncology and faculty of Medicine at the University of Oslo. He published his first Publication

in 1988 when he was 32 years old. Bruland holds a B.Sc., M.D and Ph.D. from the University of Oslo, Norway. His research includes: primary bone and soft tissue cancers (sarcomas) and skeletal metastases from prostate cancer and breast cancer; targeted radionuclide therapy, for instance the clinical development of Alpharadin, based on Radium-223; the tumor biology and prognostic impact of micro-metastases in bone-marrow aspirates on patients with primary bone cancer (osteosarcoma); external beam radiotherapy; and the radiotherapy of skeletal metastases and soft-tissue sarcomas.

He has served as supervisor to twelve Ph.D. students, nine so far having completed their Ph.D. theses. In 2008 he was elected as a member of the Norwegian Academy of Science and Letters.
