= Georg Brochmann =

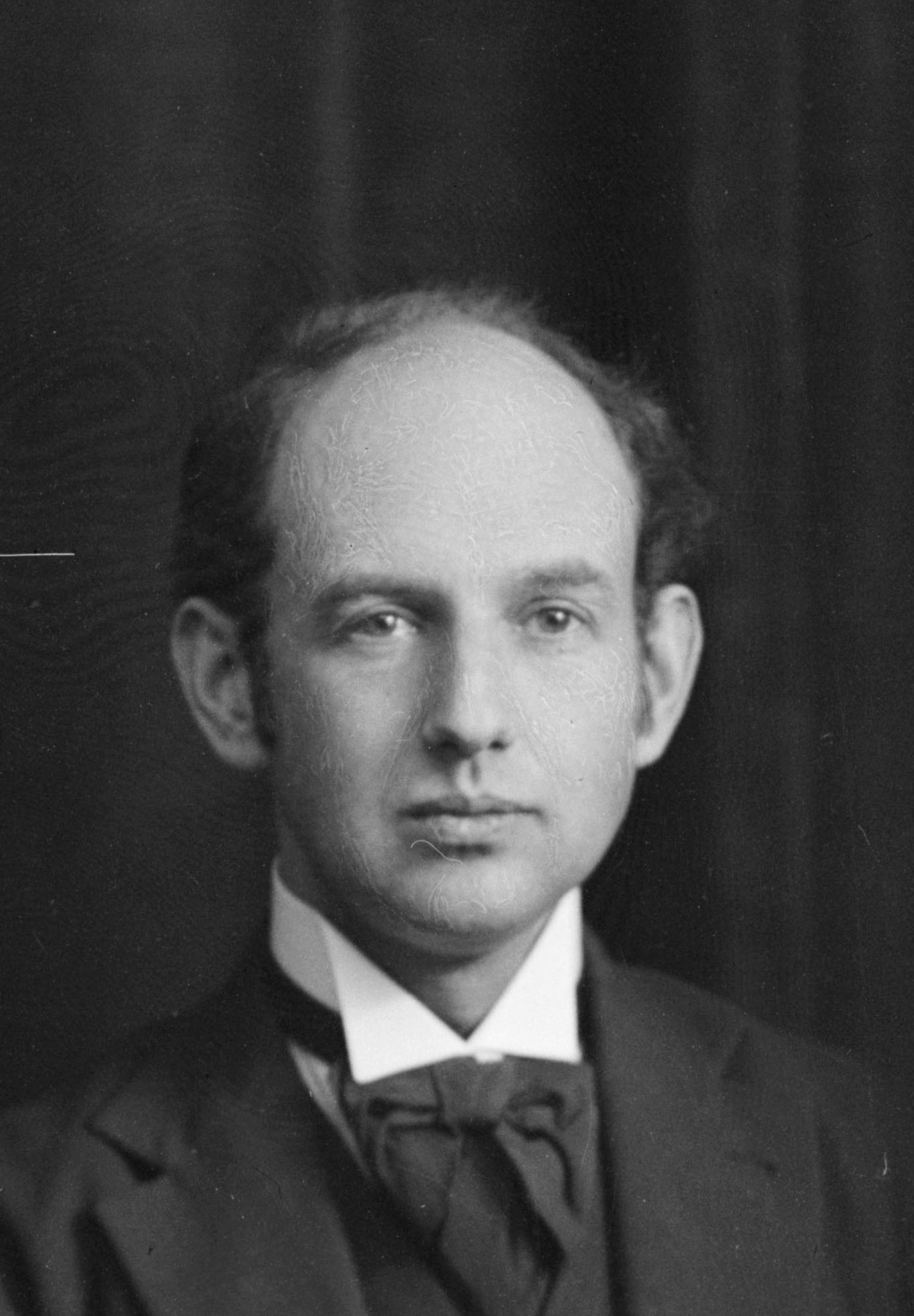
Georg Brochmann

Georg Brochmann (15 May 1894, Ullensvang Municipality – 5 January 1952) born in Hardanger, was a Norwegian journalist, writer of popular science and playwright, . He was the most productive writer of popular science in Norway in the interwar period.In 1916, Brochmann wrote for the socialist newspaper Arbeiderbladet. He served as a vice chairman of the Norwegian Authors' Union from 1938 to 1945. He was arrested by the German occupants and incarcerated at the Grini concentration camp from January to May 1945. From 1947 to his death in 1952, he was editor-in-chief of Sjømann.
