= Otto Eisler =

Czech architect

- Born: 1 June 1893; Bystřice nad Pernštejnem, Moravia, Austria-Hungary
- Died: 27 July 1968 (aged 75); Brno, Czechoslovakia
- Occupation: Architect

Otto Eisler (1 June 1893 – 27 July 1968) was a Czech architect, noted for his contributions to International style in architecture. He was Jewish and is a survivor of the Auschwitz death camp.

== Biography ==
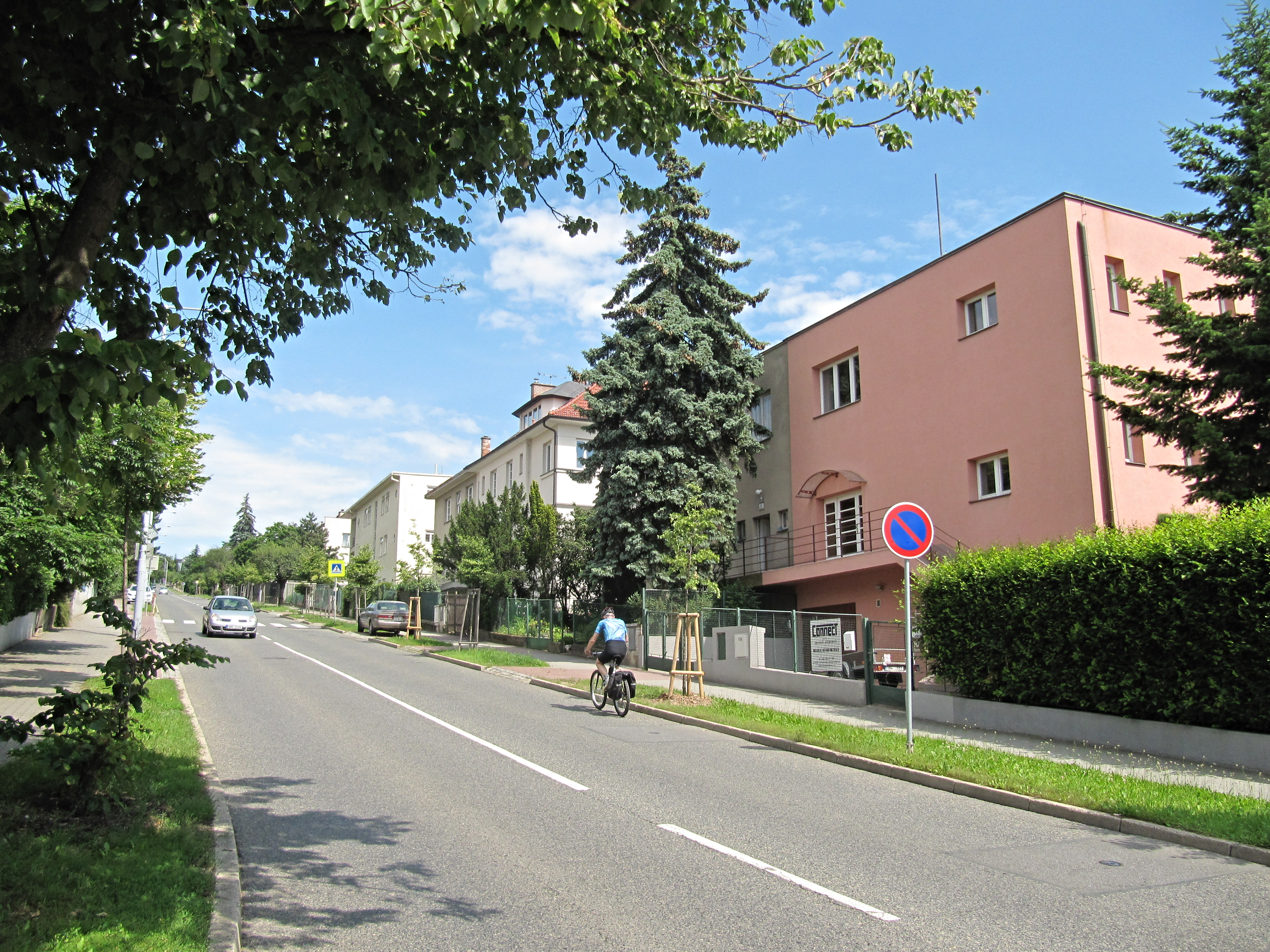
Semi-detached villa, Brno, Lipová Street

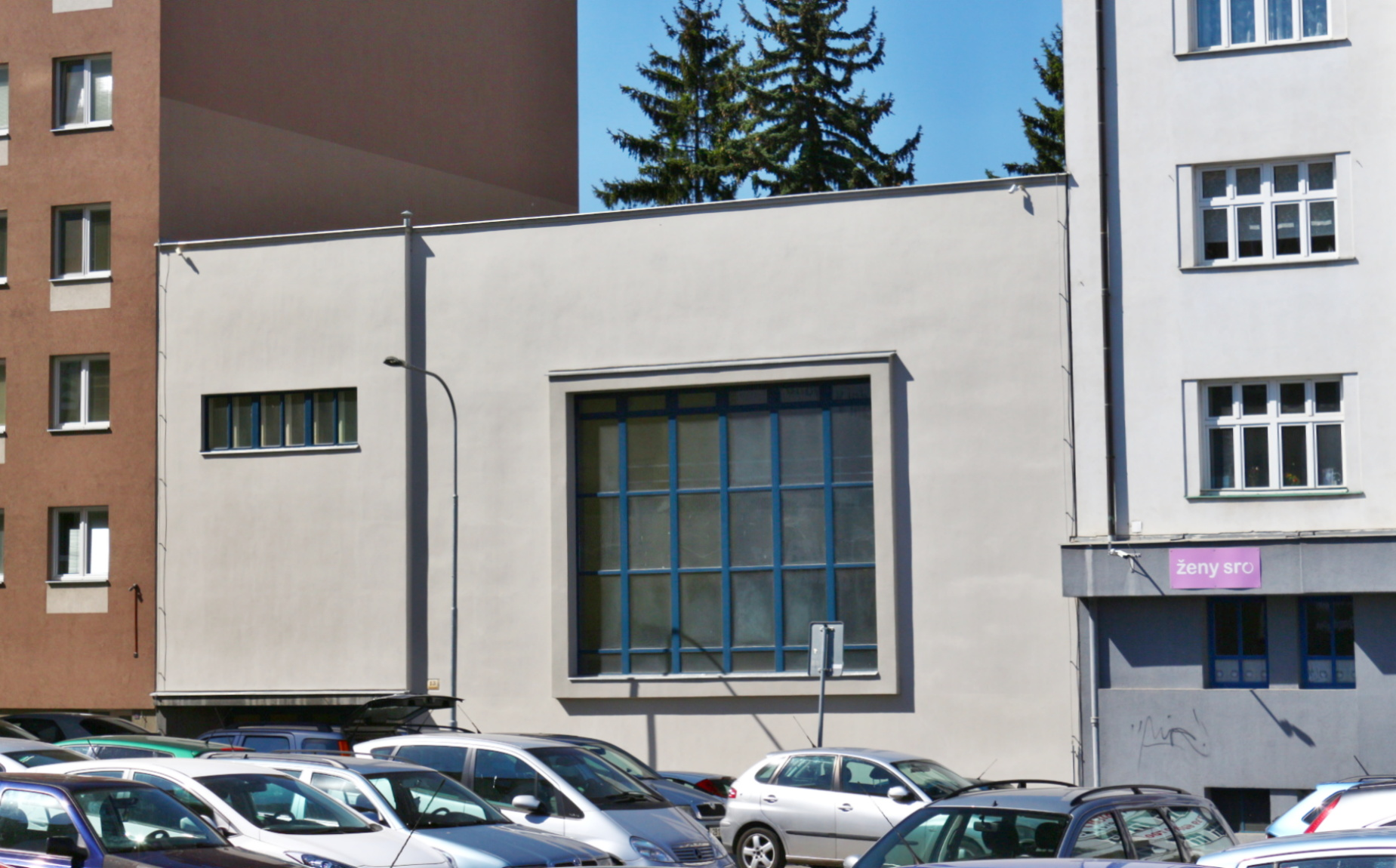
The synagogue (Agudat Achim) at Skořepka 13, designed by Eisler

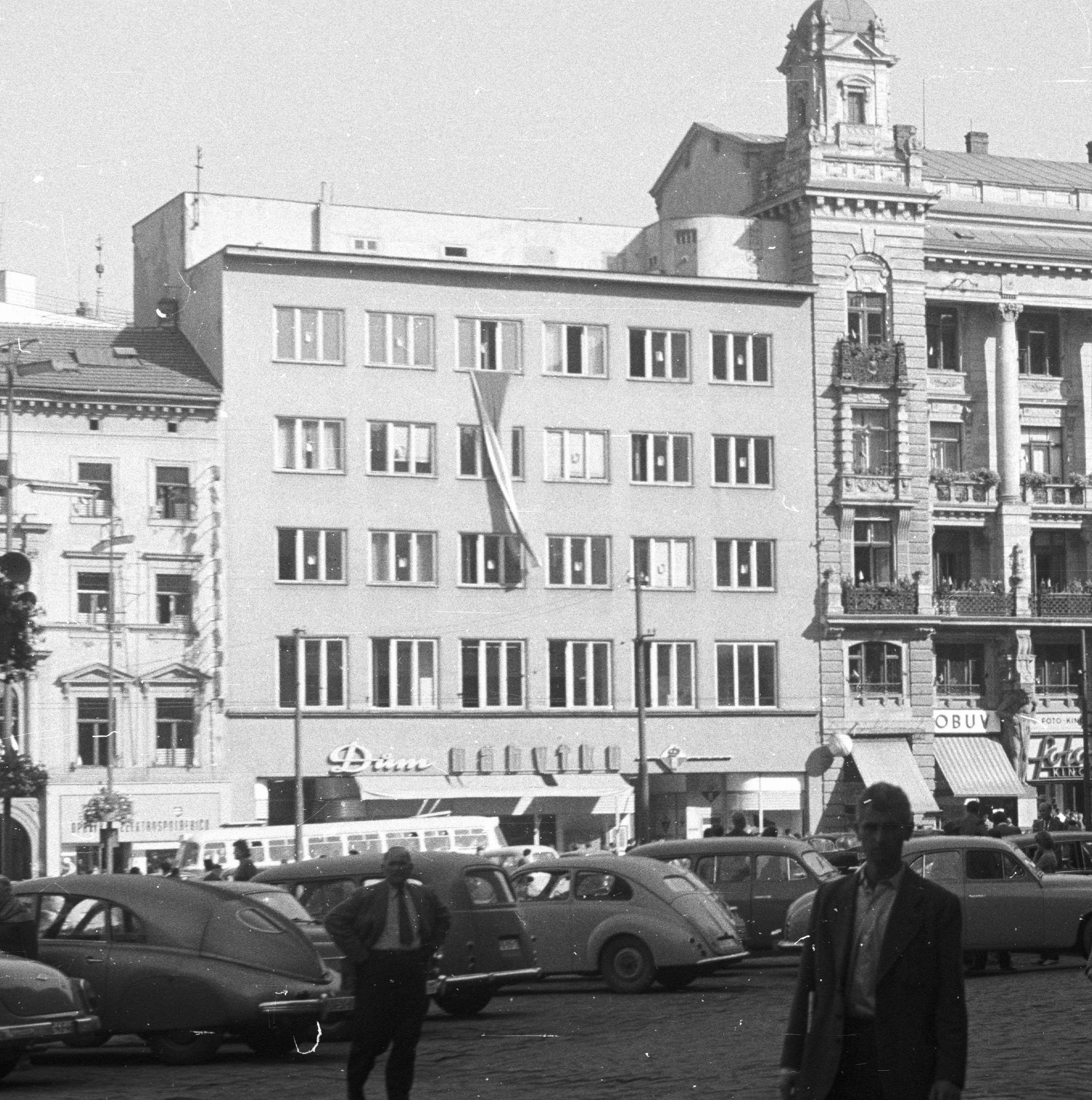
Obchodní dům JEPA

Eisler was educated at the Deutsche Technische Hochschule Brünn over the course of ten years, with a likely interruption for military service during World War I. During his studies, he worked at studios in Vienna. Upon graduation, he worked in the architectural practices of Heinrich Tessenow and Walter Gropius before founding his own firm. He also took part in managing his family's business, including his brothers' (Artur, Hugo, Leo, and Moriz) construction company.

He was subject to Nazi persecution during the German occupation of Czechoslovakia because he was both Jewish and a suspected homosexual. In April 1939, he was arrested by the Gestapo and imprisoned in the prison at Špilberk, where he was apparently tortured. When furloughed, he fled to Norway, where he arrived on 21 February 1940. After Norway was invaded by Germany, he tried to flee to Sweden but was shot and wounded only a few yards from the border, and then deported to Auschwitz on the SS Donau. There he was reunited with his brother Mořic (Moriz), with whom he survived the death march to Buchenwald.

He was liberated from Buchenwald and returned to Brno to resume his architectural career; he also took over the woodcutting business his deceased brother left to his heirs. He married his cousin Gertruda Kenderová, née Hermannová, in 1946. The family company was nationalized in 1948, and Eisler found work first in his own business, and subsequently at the Botanical Gardens of Masaryk University. He acted as the chairman of Brno Zoo from 1950 to 1953.

In addition to his professional interests in architecture, Eisler was also an avid painter, gardener, book collector, and horticulturist. Several works of art that were stolen by the Nazis were restored to his estate in the 2000s. He is buried in the Jewish cemetery in Brno.

== Notable works ==
- House for two brothers, Neumannova 10, Brno, 1930–1931 (built for himself and Mořic Eisler).
- Synagogue in 13 Skořepka street, Brno, 1934 (the only remaining synagogue in Brno).
- Synagogue, Uherský Brod, 1946.
- Brno Zoo, 1949–1966.

== Gallery ==
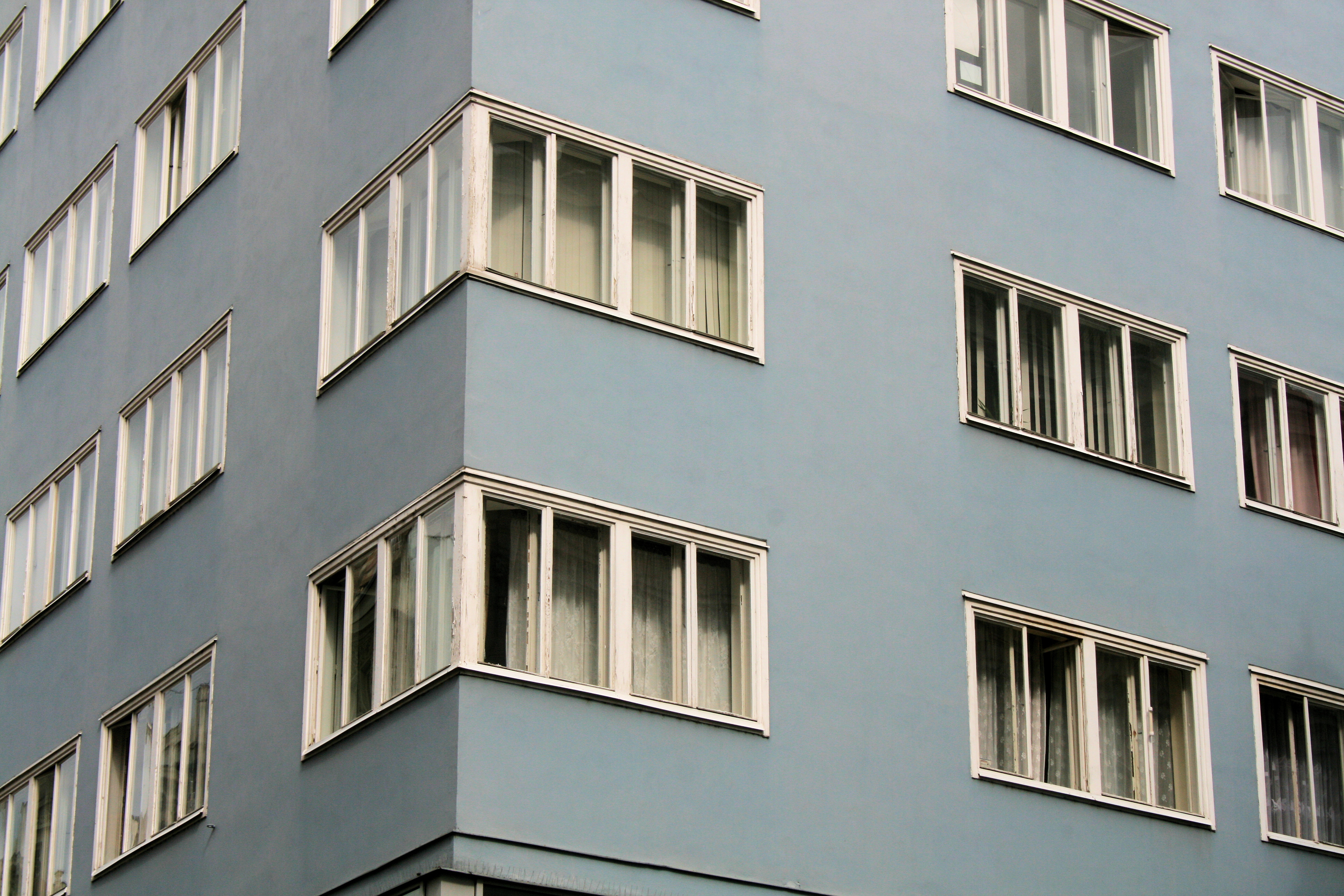
Dům Wittreich a Deutsch, Masarykova 19-21

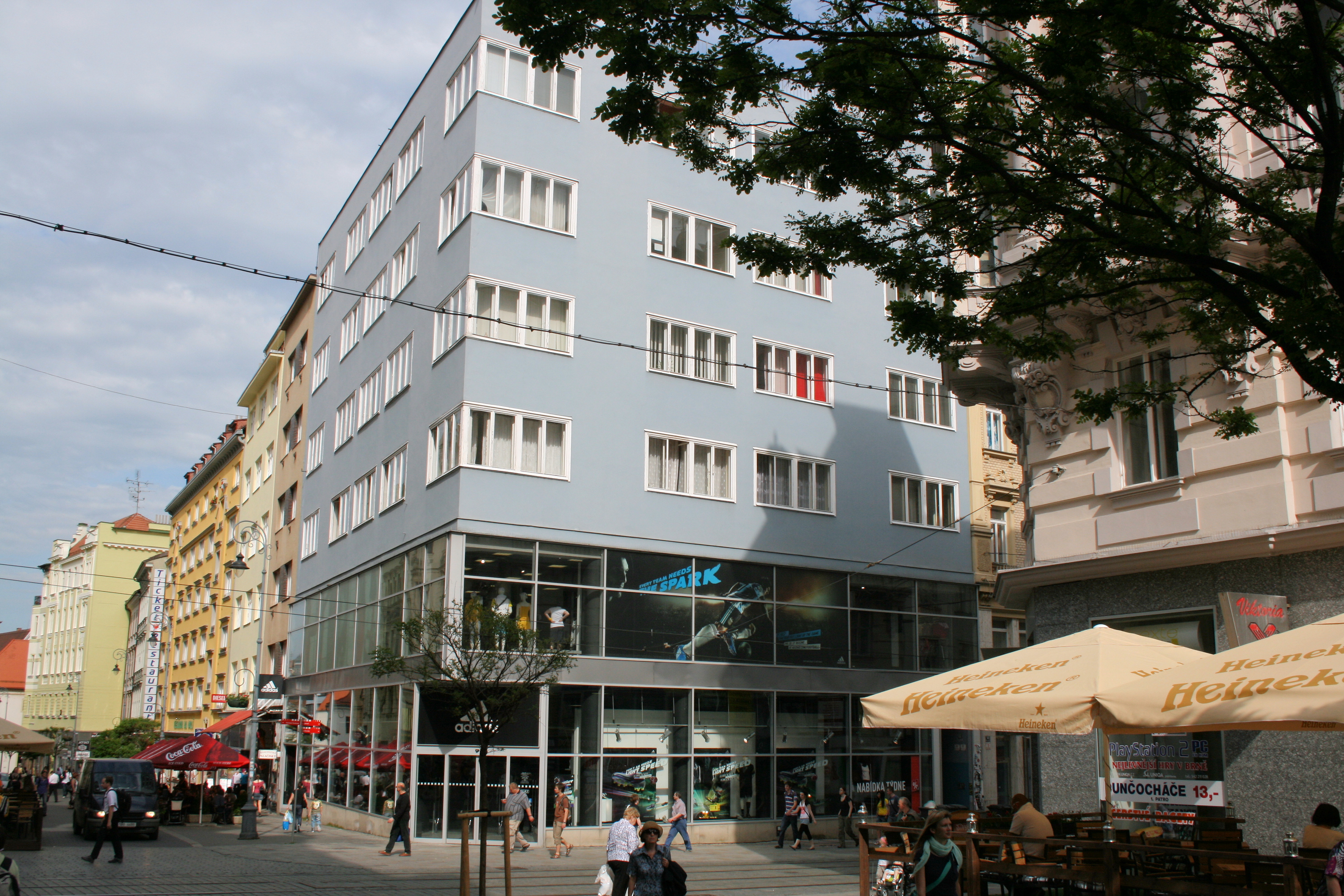
Dům Wittreich a Deutsch, Masarykova 19-21

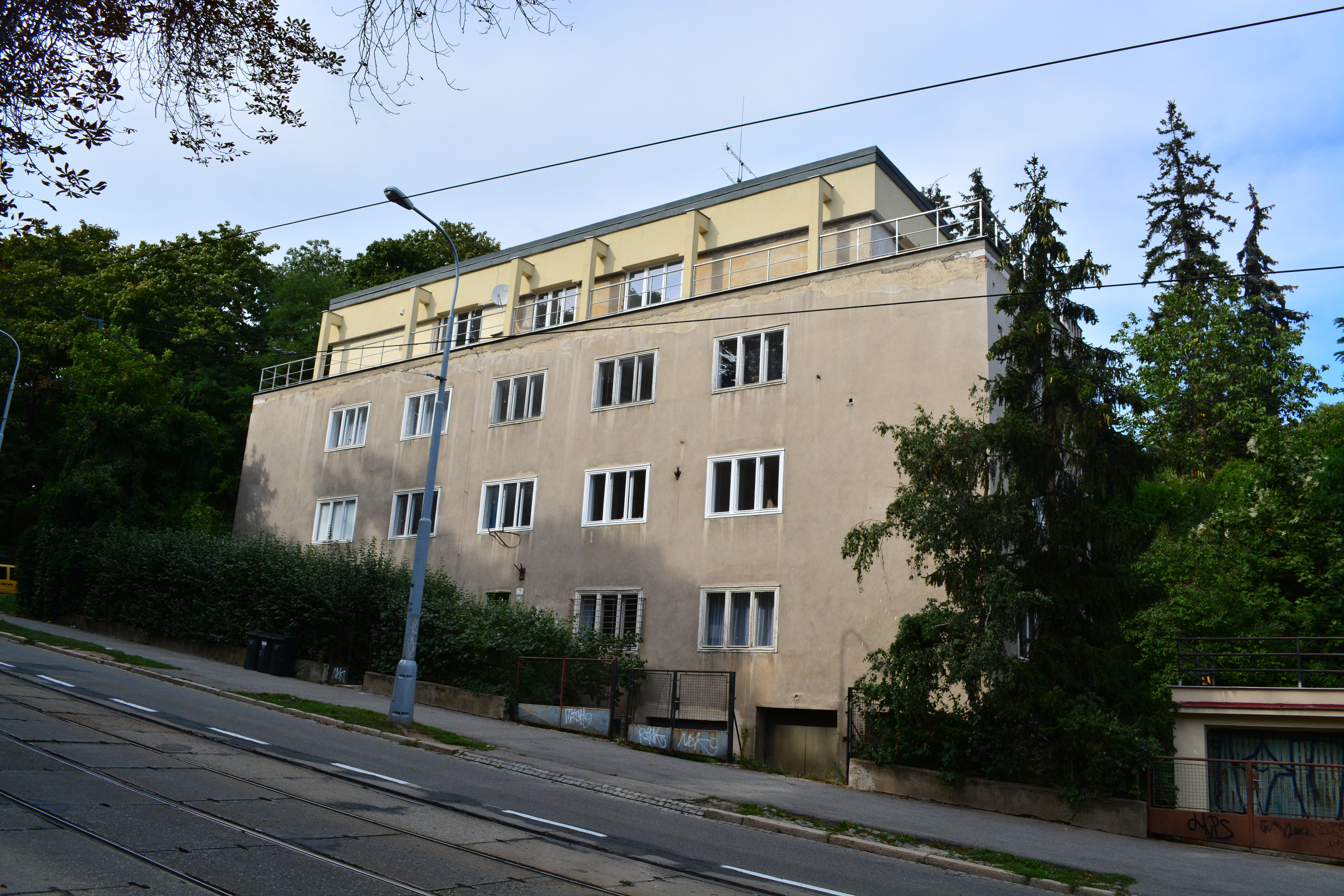
Údolní 72

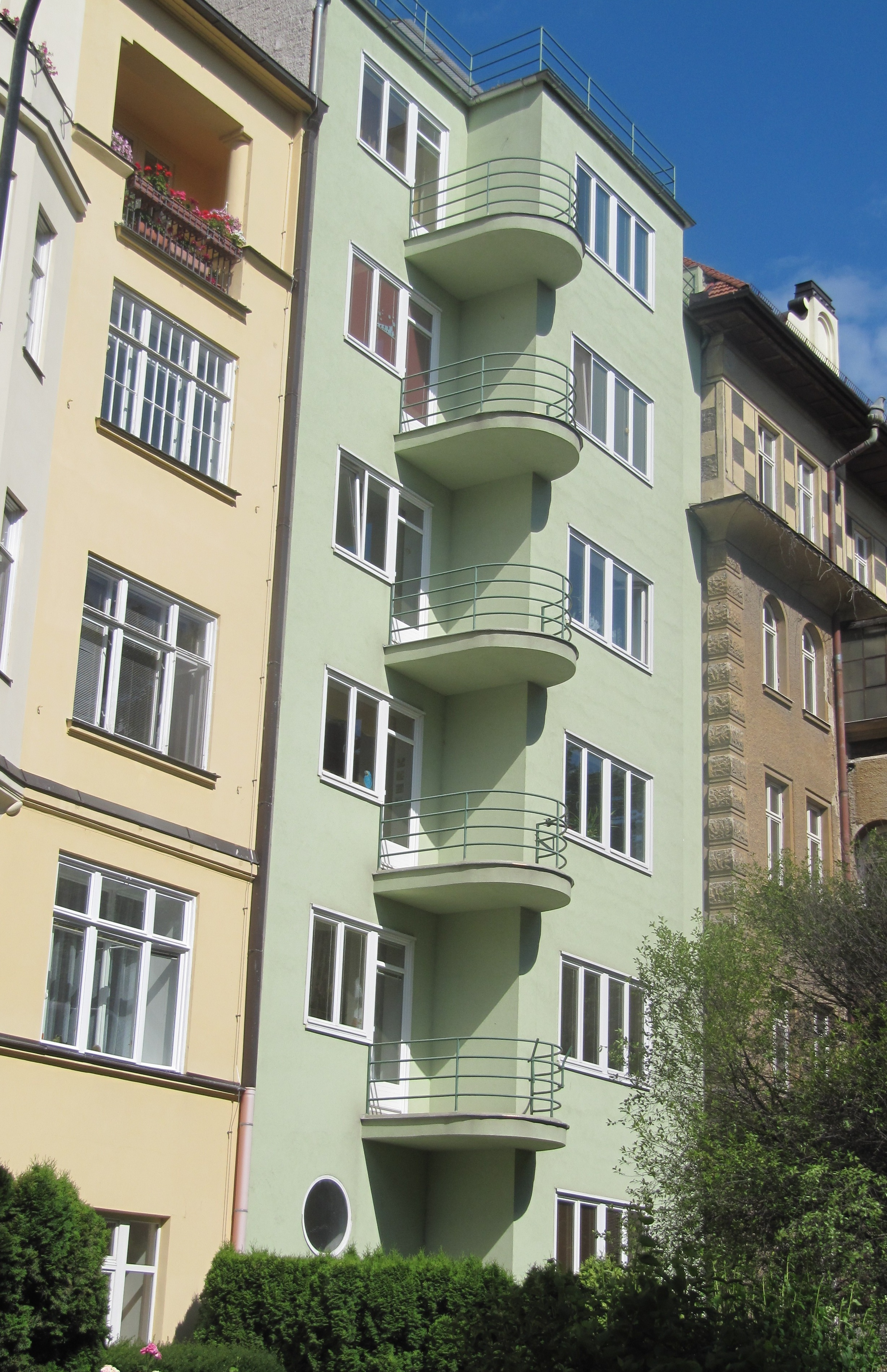
Botanická 6

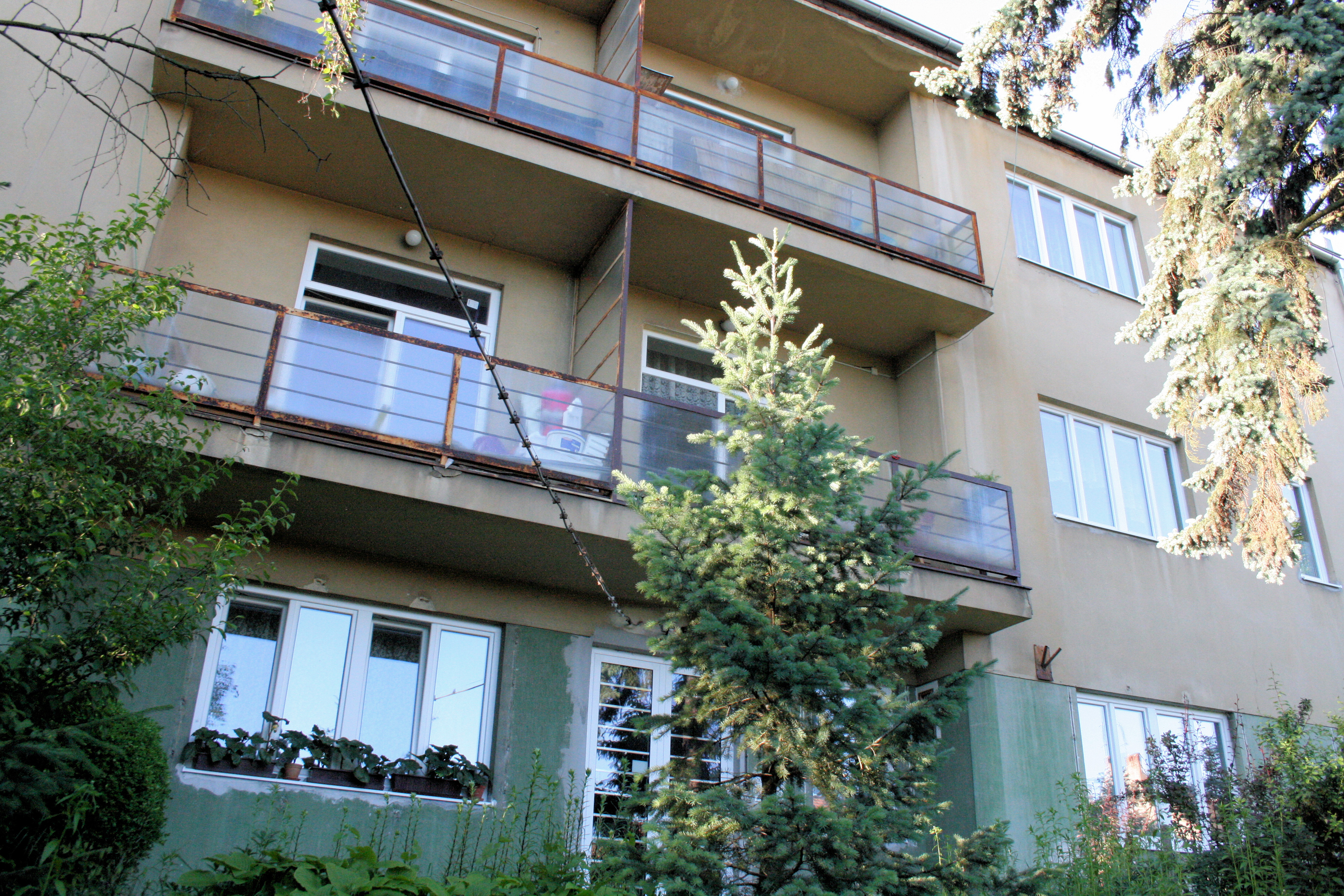
Kamenomlýnská 14

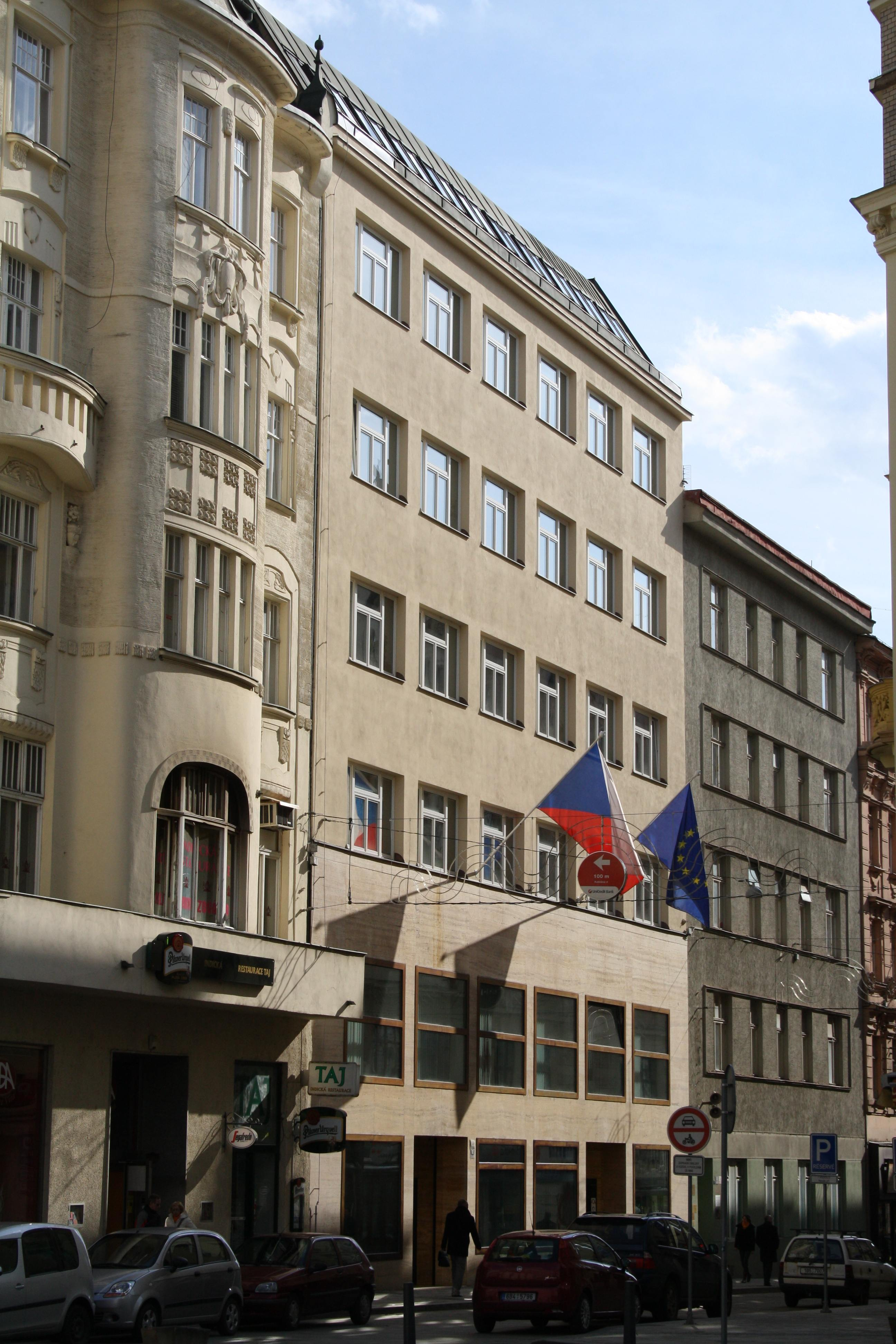
Běhounská 10

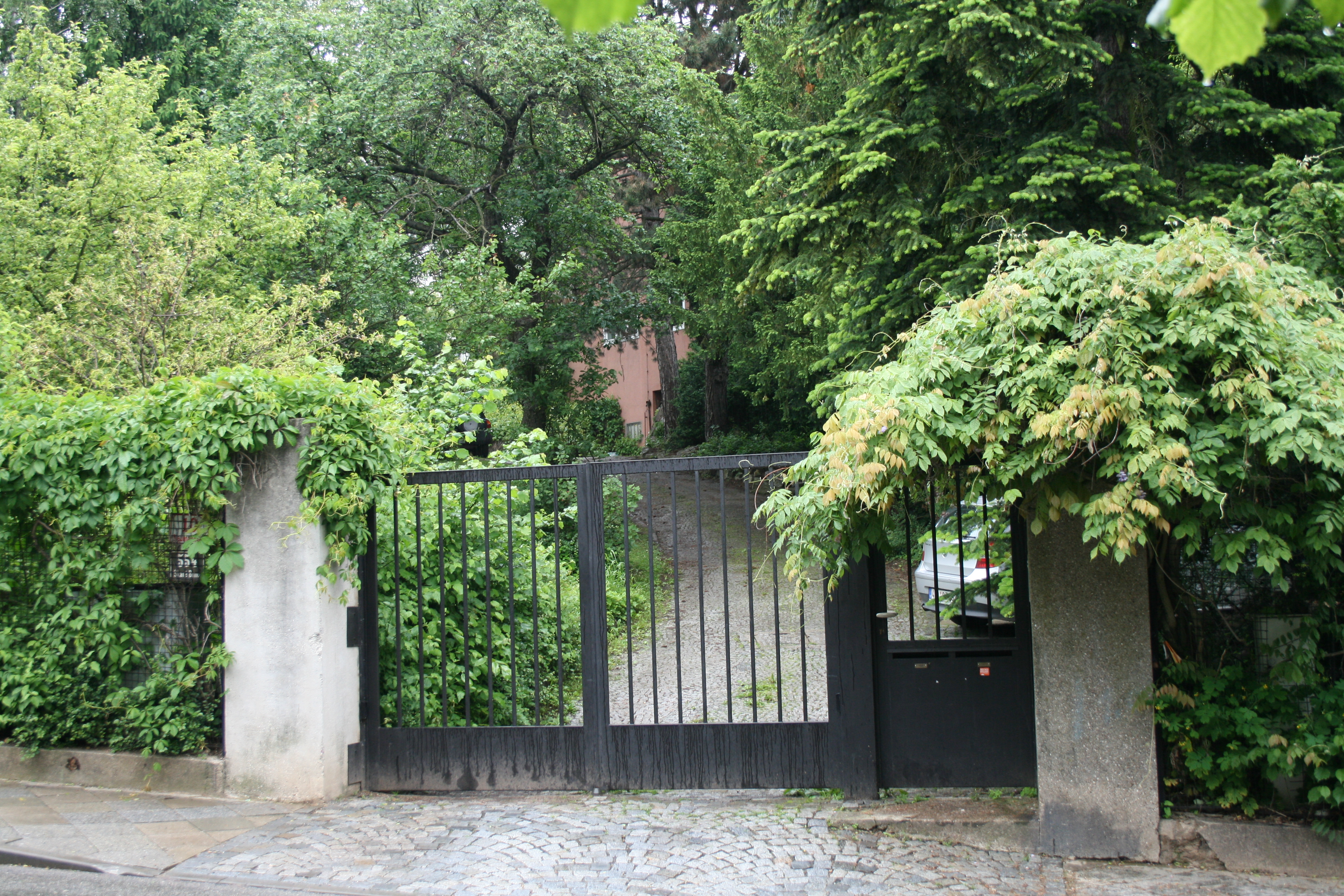
Neumannova 10, Villa of Otto Eisler

== Literature ==
- KAMENÍK, Jan. Vzpomínka na architekta Eislera, jednoho ze zakladatelů ZOO Brno. ZOOreport. Září 2008, roč. X., čís. 3, s. 8.
- KLENOVSKÝ, Jaroslav. Brno židovské, historie a památky osídlení města Brna. Brno: ERA, 2002.
- PELČÁK, Petr; ŠKRABAL, Jindřich; WAHLA, Ivan. Otto Eisler. Brno: Obecní dům Brno, 1998.
