= Berg concentration camp =

Nazi concentration camp in Norway

- Berg concentration camp
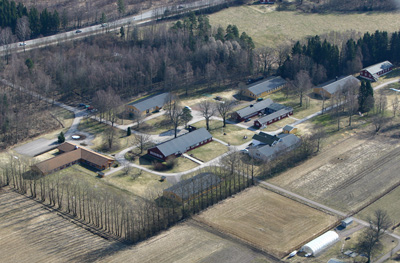
- Berg prison as it stands in the 21st century.
- Coordinates: 59°17′57″N 10°24′04″E
- Known for: Internment and transit center for political prisoners and Jews by the Reichcomminsartt Norway and Quisling regime
- Location: Tønsberg, Norway

Berg interneringsleir (Berg internment camp) was a concentration camp near Tønsberg in Norway that served as an internment and transit center for political prisoners and Jews during the Nazi occupation of Norway.

== Establishment ==
The camp at Berg was founded upon an initiative in the fall of 1941 from the Norwegian fascist Nasjonal Samling party, despite some opposition from the German occupying authorities, SS leader Wilhelm Rediess in particular. The main advocates for the camp were Minister of Justice Sverre Riisnæs, mayor Bjerck of Tønsberg, and head of the local fascist paramilitary organization, the Hirden, in Vestfold, Eivind Wallestad. Police minister Jonas Lie approved the construction plans on 12 June 1942.

Vidkun Quisling had spoken of the camp at a speech in Horten on 25 May 1942 as an expression of his outrage of the celebration of Norwegian Constitution Day by Norwegian patriots. He promised his political opposition that a "chicken coop" would be established for them.

The camp was planned to have a capacity of 3,000 prisoners but was never fully finished. It was unique among the camps in Norway in that it was run entirely by collaborating Norwegians under the authority of the Ministry of Police.

== Prisoners ==
The first prisoners to Berg were a contingent of 60 male Jews arrested on 26 October 1942. They arrived by train and were force-marched into the still-unfinished camp. The barracks were uninsulated and lacked sanitary facilities, beds, or other furniture. Within two days, there were 350 prisoners under the administration of Leif Lindseth. They were told that anyone who tried to escape would be summarily shot; and that ten of their fellow inmates and their families would also be shot in retribution.

During the month before their deportation to Germany en route for Auschwitz, the Jewish prisoners were put to hard labor, expanding the camp. They worked seven days a week from 7:30 am to 8:30 pm, subsisting on a quarter loaf of bread, soup from flowers, and ersatz coffee.

The local Red Cross chapter, led by Anton Jervell, made attempts to provide relief to the prisoners with mixed success.

After most of the Jewish prisoners had been deported, several groups of political prisoners moved in. Conditions deteriorated after this, and disease became prevalent. In April 1943, conditions started to improve somewhat, but Berg was considered among the worst camps in Norway and far worse than Grini.

In addition to the 350 Jewish prisoners held at Grini, 847 other prisoners spent time at Berg. During the winter of 1944/45, the camp reached its maximum population of 500-600 prisoners. Of the 280 Jewish prisoners who were deported from Berg, seven survived.

=== Notable prisoners ===
Notable prisoners include:

- Charles Braude flyweight boxer (member of Workers' Sports Association) who won number of championships, in Norway and abroad, and one of the lead subjects of Norwegian movie Betrayal.
- Berthold Epstein
- Victor Moritz Goldschmidt, 1942
- Herman Sachnowitz
- Ole Øisang, 1944–1945

As of 2015, only one Jewish prisoner at Berg during World War II was still alive; his father who was married to a Jew was deported, while the son, who was not deported because he had "a Norwegian wife", Martin Mankowitz, changed his last name to Meholm, after the war.

== Post-war use ==
After the war, the camp was used to imprison those accused of having collaborated with the war-time fascist Quisling regime.
