= Cissi Klein =

Norwegian holocaust victim

Cissi Pera Klein
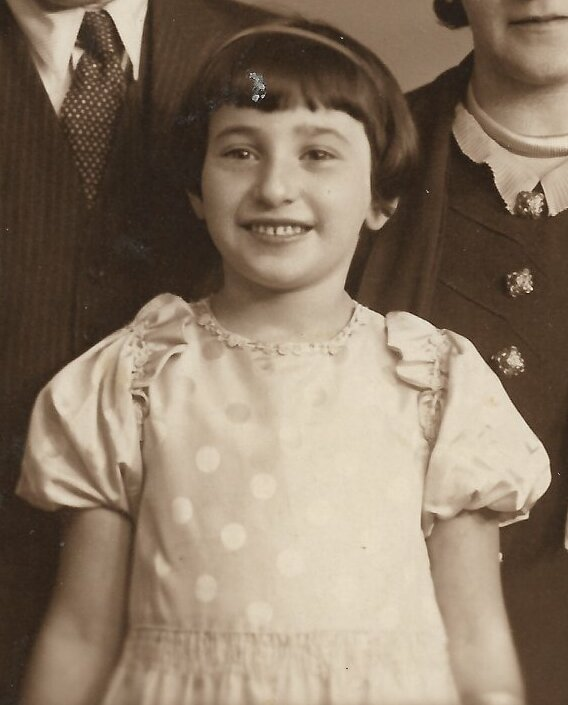
- Born: 19 April 1929; Narvik, Norway
- Died: 3 March 1943 (aged 13); Auschwitz, occupied Poland

Cissi Pera Klein (19 April 1929 in Narvik – 3 March 1943 in Auschwitz) was a Norwegian Jewish girl who is commemorated every year as one of the victims of the Holocaust in her hometown in Trondheim. Her parents had immigrated to Norway from the Baltic states around 1905, at first living in North Norway, but then establishing a retail store in Trondheim. She was arrested at her school on 6 October 1942, detained, and ultimately deported with the transport ship Gotenland from Oslo to Stettin, from which she was sent by train first to Berlin and then to Auschwitz, where she was murdered the day she arrived, on 3 March 1943. She was 13 years old.

Cissi's mother, Mille Klein, escaped to Sweden in 1943 and stayed with Rabbi Abraham Israel Jacobson and his wife in Stockholm, who attempted to have Cissi and her brother Abraham adopted and naturalized as Swedish citizens, in the hope that this would allow them to be transferred to a section of the Bergen-Belsen concentration camp reserved for citizens of neutral countries. Swedish authorities approved the adoption and citizenship in August 1943, but by then Cissi and her brother, as well as their father, had already been murdered in Auschwitz five months earlier.

Cissi Klein became famous in her hometown of Trondheim in the mid-1990s, when the city decided to appoint one of its 72 residents who were deported as a symbol for the persecution during the war. In 1995, the street where she lived was named Cissi Kleins gate, and a statue of her made by Tore Bjørn Skjølsvik and Tone Ek was unveiled in the park nearby in 1997. In memory of the day she was removed from her school by police, pupils from the Kalvskinnet Primary School visit the park on 6 October every year to lay flowers. The composer Ståle Kleiberg has written a musical piece in her memory.

The statue of Cissi Klein was used in an opening scene of The Birdcatcher (film)

== Gallery ==
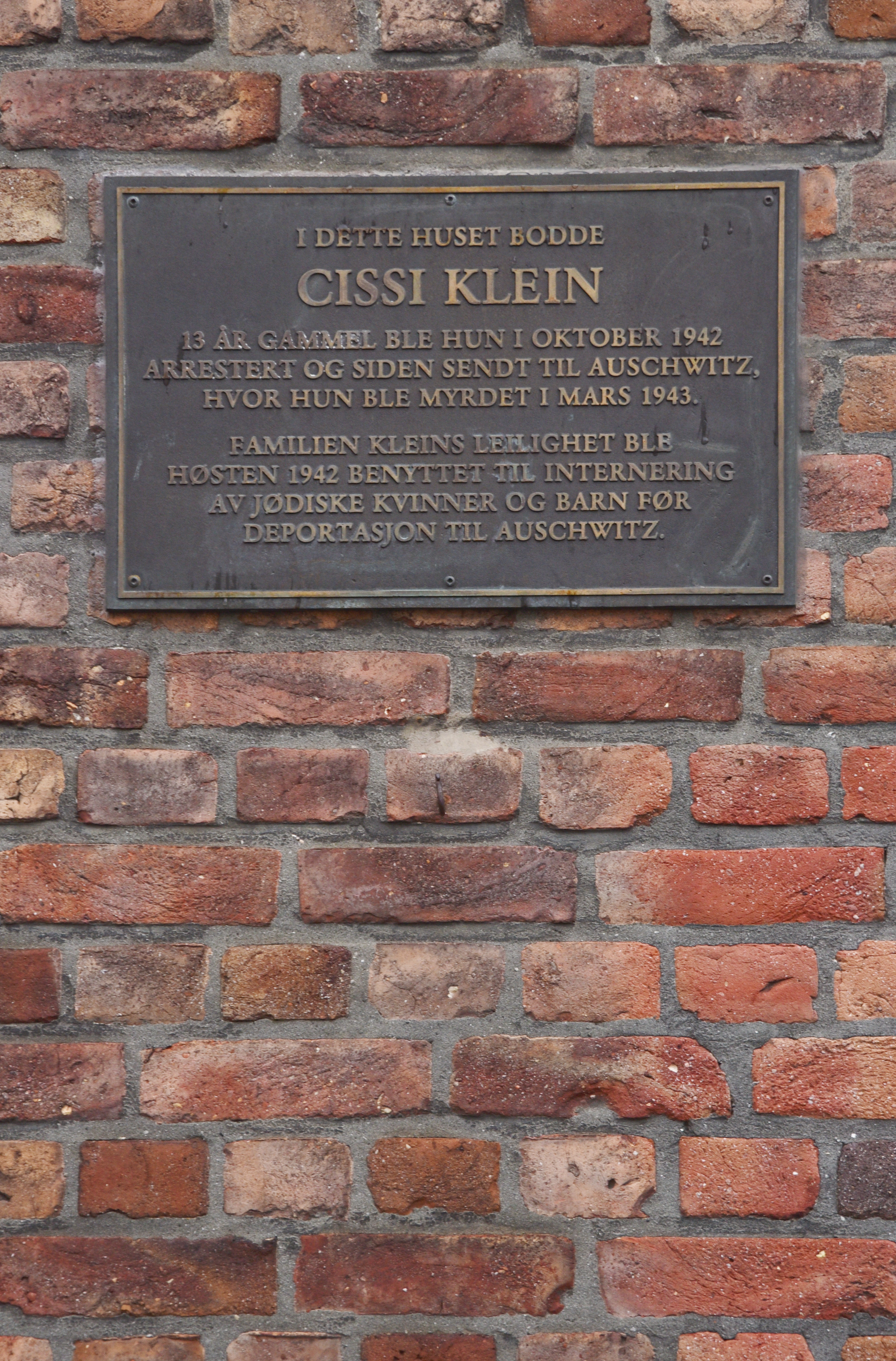
Memorial plaque

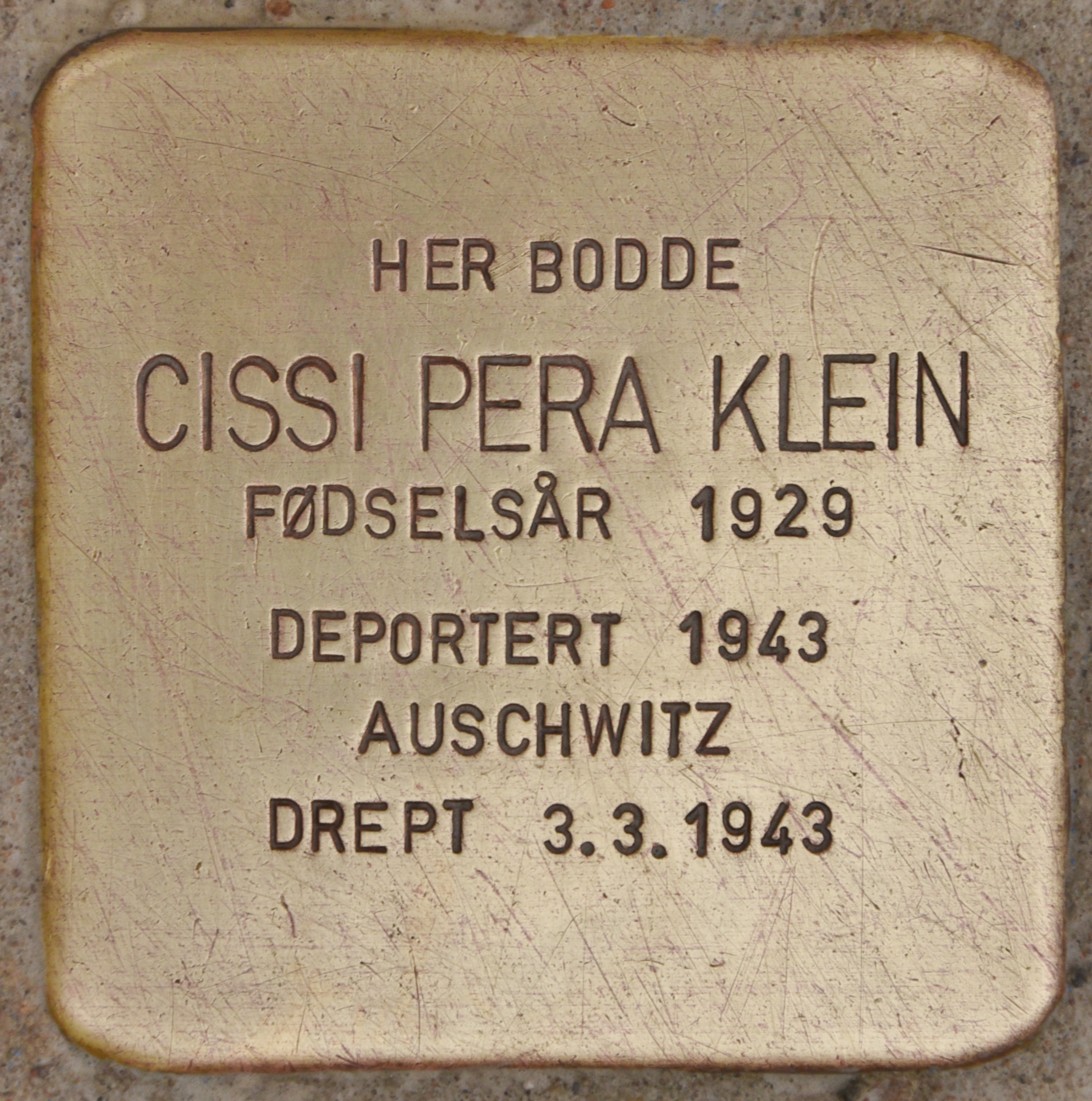
Stolperstein

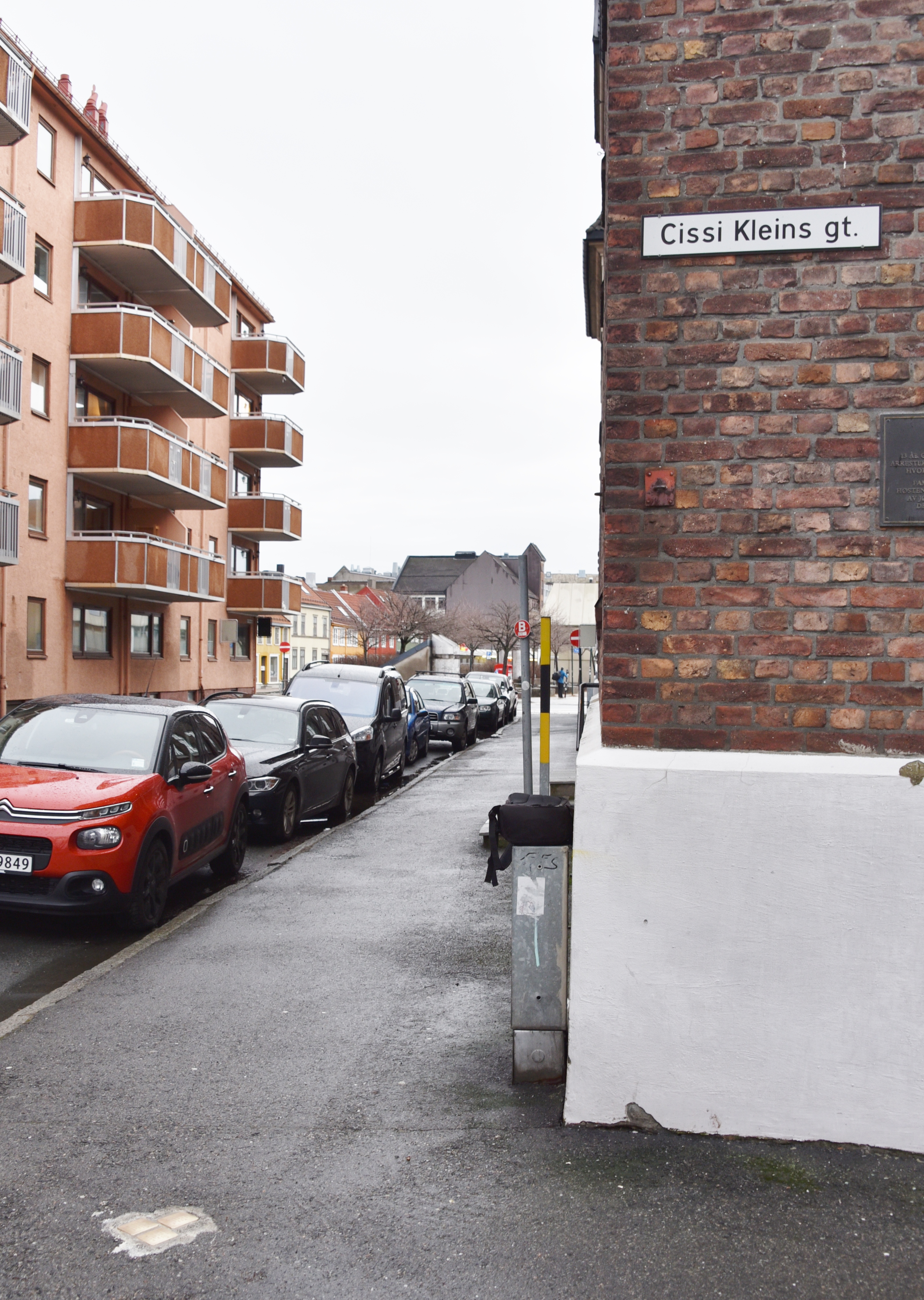
Cissi Klein gate
