= Jewish deportees from Norway during World War II =

Group of victims of the Holocaust

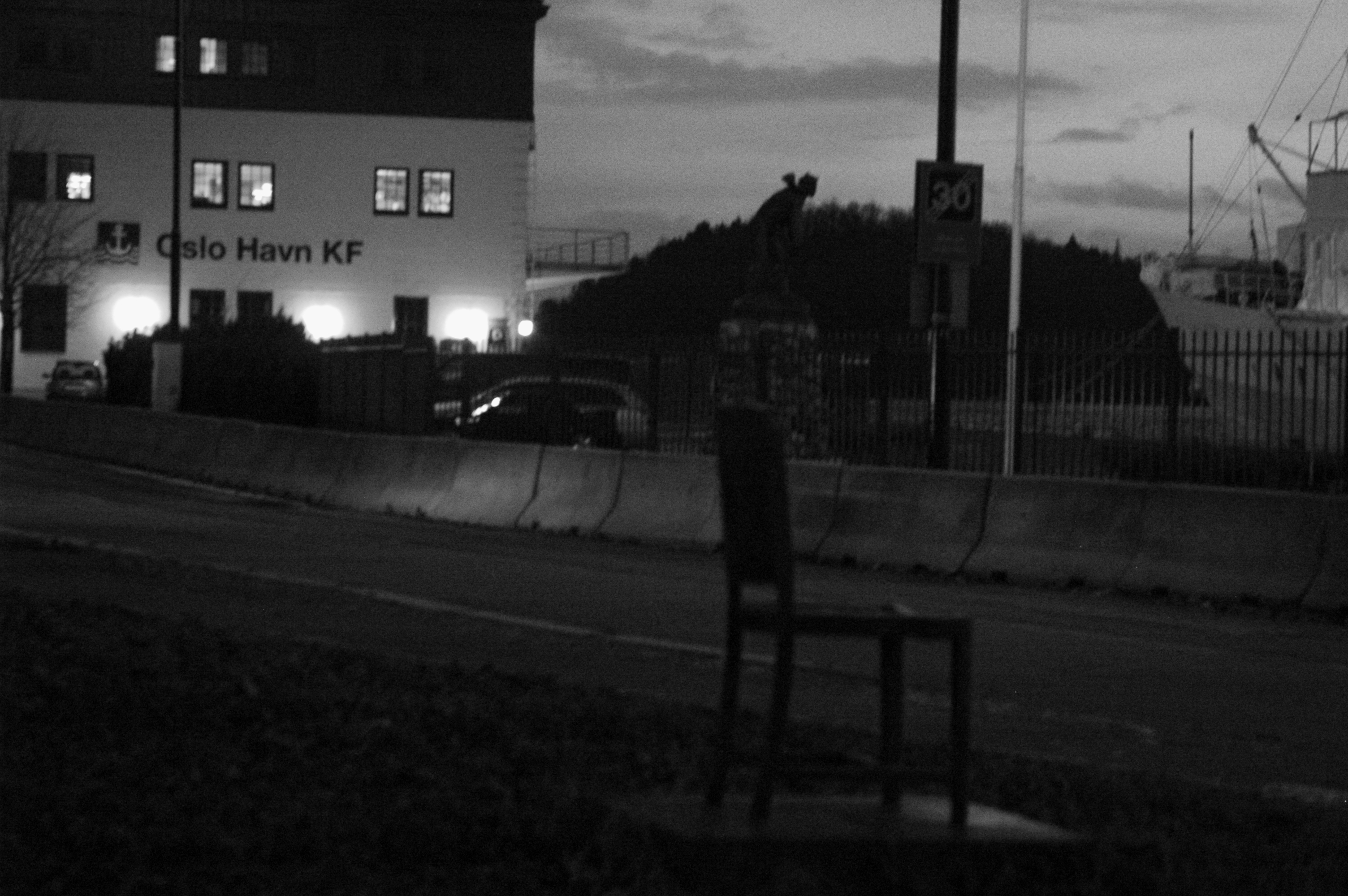
View of the pier in Oslo where the deportations took place, taken 26 November 2009, 67 years after the largest deportation

Prior to the deportation of individuals of Jewish background to the concentration camps there were at least 2,173 Jews in Norway. During the Nazi occupation of Norway 772 of these were arrested, detained, and/or deported, most of them sent to Auschwitz or other extermination camps where 742 were murdered. 23 died as a result of extrajudicial execution, murder, and suicide during the war. Between 28 and 34 of those deported survived their continued imprisonment (following their deportation). The Norwegian police and German authorities kept records of these victims, and so, researchers were able to compile information about the deportees. (Note: Some discrepancies about the numbers remain. For example, German documents related to the transit of prisoners on the Donau indicate that 530 were deported from Oslo, whereas the list compiled by Ottosen (1992) indicates that 534 were on board, but this includes Helene Johansen and Mirjam Kristiansen, who were deported on the Donau, but on another date. Kai Feinberg, who was a prisoner on the Donau, was ordered to compile a list of prisoners at the time, and his recollection was that there were 532 on board. Mendelsohn allows that some individuals may have been counted twice, others may have been omitted. The list provided here is based on Ottosen's list, with annotations where these are available. It has been checked for possible duplicates based on name and date of birth. In most sources, the number of survivors is commonly cited as 26; Ottosen (1992) lists 26 individuals as survivors, but omits Harry Meyer, who was captured in the context of the Kvarstad incident, and Robert Savosnick, probably due to an error on his part; as Savosnick is listed as a survivor in the master of list of deportees. This list includes all those who the Nazi authorities considered Jewish. A few of these did not consider themselves Jewish. None of the available literature seeks to ascertain which of the victims were or were not Jewish according to halacha.)

== Before deportation ==
The deportation followed a series of steps to discriminate, persecute, and disenfranchise Jews in Norway. Jewish individuals were at first arrested, Jewish property was confiscated, Jews were ordered to report to local police stations and have their identification cards stamped with a "J" and fill in a lengthy form about their profession, holdings, and family. Based on the lists the police compiled, most Jewish adult men were arrested and detained in October 1942, and by November 26, women and children were also arrested for deportation. This is the only time in Norwegian history that Norwegian police had been ordered to arrest children.

The deportation from Norway to concentration camps followed a planned staging of events involving both Norwegian police authorities and German Gestapo, Sicherheitsdienst, and SS staff, though the front for the campaign was through Statspolitiet under the command of Karl Marthinsen:

- As of part of an overall effort to register and disenfranchise Jews from Norwegian economic and political life, some individuals were arrested, detained and deported immediately for various reasons. Some were citizens of countries not under German control or with puppet regimes (e.g., France and Romania); others were arrested as political prisoners early in the process, and treated individually.
- Smaller groups were typically transported with the transport Monte Rosa, which was used for regular troop and prisoner transports between Oslo and Århus in Denmark.

Detentions and deportation took on scale when all Jewish men were ordered arrested on October 26, 1942 and sent to camps in Norway, notable Berg, Grini, and Falstad, where they were held under harsh conditions until the deportation, targeted for November 26 on the Donau.

Women and children were arrested on or just before November 26 with the goal of deporting them the same day.

The arrests were conducted by Norwegian policemen and lensmenn—not by Germans—according to Baard Herman Borge (a researcher).

=== After arrival at the pier in Oslo ===
- Under the command of Knut Rød, women and children in Oslo and Aker were joined with male members of the family at the pier at Akershuskaia where they were forcibly boarded on the SS Donau.
- On the same day, the Monte Rosa also left Akershuskaia with a smaller number of Jewish prisoners, primarily from Grini
- However, delays in transit from camps outside of Oslo caused the Donau to leave several intended deportees in Norway for a later departure. These were imprisoned at the Bredtveit concentration camp, where they were subjected to mistreatment and neglect. The transport ship Gotenland left in February with remaining prisoners.

== Deportation ==
The deportation schedule for the major transports was:

Departure date	Ship	No. of Jewish deportees	No. of survivors	Route and destination
20-Nov-1942	Monte Rosa	19	0	Docked in Århus, train to Auschwitz via Hamburg
26-Nov-1942	Monte Rosa	27	2	Docked in Århus, train to Auschwitz via Hamburg
26-Nov-1942	Donau	532	9	Docked in Stettin, train to Auschwitz
25-Feb-1943	Gotenland	157	6	Docked in Stettin, train to Auschwitz via Berlin
Other, 27-Apr-1941 - 10-Aug-1944	Various ships	30	11	
Total		768	28	

Most of those deported were Norwegian citizens. Some were stateless refugees, and a few were citizens of other countries.

In addition to those Jews from Norway which were killed by the Nazis in death camps (Vernichtungslager), at least 22 more Jews died in Norway as a result of murder, extrajudicial executions and suicide. (Note: A smaller number of Jews and individuals judged to be of Jewish heritage were imprisoned under harsh circumstances in Norway during the war but spared deportation, either because they were married to non-Jews, did not fall under the Nazi criteria for being Jewish, or were citizens of countries not under German occupation. It also appears that Jews with Danish citizenship were spared. The deaths of Jews in Norway does not include those who died of natural causes that may have been aggravated by neglect or denial of adequate medical treatment.)

== Age distribution of Jews deported from Norway ==
Age	Number	Percentage
0-5	16	2.2%
6-15	49	6.6%
16-25	121	16.5%
26-35	128	17.5%
36-45	104	14.0%
46-55	153	20.7%
56-65	112	15.2%
66-75	43	5.9%
>76	11	1.5%

== Distribution of deportees by county arrested and transport ==
Jewish individuals who were deported included those with Norwegian citizenship, foreign citizens, and stateless refugees that were arrested and deported. The site where they were arrested was not always their place of residence; many had relocated to rural areas to avoid detection. The majority of those deported were immediately murdered in the gas chambers at Auschwitz; some were put to slave labor but perished soon after. A very small number ultimately survived.

	Ship					
County	Donau	Gotenland	Kvarstad	Monte Rosa	Other route	Totals
Østfold	2	2		1	4	9
Akershus	36	2			1	39
Aust-Agder					2	2
Buskerud	15	1			4	20
Finnmark	2					2
Hedmark	5	1		3		9
Hordaland	13	12		1		26
Møre og Romsdal	3	24		3		30
Nordland	6	3		4		13
Oppland	12	2				14
Oslo	395	41		23	17	476
Rogaland	5	5			2	13
Sør-Trøndelag	6	53	1	2		62
Sogn og Fjordane	4					4
Telemark		1		1		2
Troms	1	8		8		17
Vest-Agder	2					2
Vestfold	27	2				29
Totals	534	157	1	46	30	768

== Jews who died in prison camp ==
- Cissi Klein
- Ruth Maier
- Moritz Rabinowitz

== Liberation and return ==
Thousands of Norwegians were deported to camps in Germany and German-occupied territories during World War II. Most of those who survived were rescued by the White Buses campaign undertaken by the Norwegian government in exile, the Swedish government, the Danish government, with the Swedish Red Cross implementing the rescue with its offices. This followed intensive efforts by Norwegian and other Scandinavians to track and maintain contact with Norwegian citizens in camps. By comparison, there was no organized effort to maintain contact with and establish the fate of Jews who had been deported from Norway.

34 of the deportees survived the war. At least 21 of them returned to Norway soon after the war. (Note: Friedrich and Grete Dollar were among the last Norwegian sent to Norway. It is unclear how they returned to Kristiansand; Moritz Kahan returned to Norway via unknown means; The twins Fritz and Hans Lustig returned to their home town of Brno after the war but emigrated years later, settling in Norway.; Otto Eisler, returned to his home city of Brno after the war.; Berthold Epstein, a noted professor in pediatrics, returned to Prague after the war to continue his medical and academic career; Fritz Georg Ruzicka did not return to Norway but settled in Denmark to a successful career as an entertainer; Leopold and Lisa Segal settled in Great Britain after the war) The survivors were liberated from the following camps:

- Auschwitz (at least three survivors) (Note: Jacques Stanning was liberated by Soviet forces in Auschwitz. He returned to Norway in August 1945.; Kai Feinberg was liberated from Auschwitz and worked for some time in Eastern Europe before he returned to Norway on his own; Paul Ludwig Cohn, was ill in Auschwitz when it was liberated by Soviet forces and narrowly escaped.)
- Bergen Belsen (at least three survivors) (Note: Herman Sachnowitz was liberated from Bergen Belsen, put under the care of British troops and returned to Norway on his own)
- Buchenwald: at least five survivors. Having survived a death march from Auschwitz to Buchenwald, Leo Eitinger, Pelle Hirsch, Assor Hirsch, Julius Paltiel, and Samuel Steinmann were liberated there on April 11. On March 1, fellow Norwegian but non-Jewish students had been sent by train from Buchenwald to Neuengamme as part of the White Buses operation, but these five were not allowed to leave on account of being Jewish. Following the liberation, the five had to find their own way home with the help of American and Danish individuals and officials. They arrived by boat in Oslo. Authorities were unable to provide them with any help, not even housing, and they relied on friends to get situated again. (Note: Several sources cite the experiences of Eitinger, the Hirsch brothers, Paltiel, and Steinmann, including: "Buchenwald" (in Norwegian). White Buses Foundation., Paltiel's memoirs, Steinmann's interview, and the biography of Eitinger. Both Paltiel and Steinmann say that being left behind by the White Buses was the greatest disappointment in their time in captivity.)
- Mauthausen—at least two survivors. (Note: Fritz and Hans Lustig)
- Ravensbruck—at least one survivor. (Note: Benno Asberg was refused admission to the White Buses while in Ravensbrück, escaped, and was rescued by advancing Soviet forces; Mendelsohn (1986, p. 181))
- Sachsenhausen—at least four survivors including Moritz Nachtstern who was kept in Block 19 at Sachsenhausen as part of Nazi Germany's efforts to counterfeit Allied currency. He found his own way home after liberation. (Note: Georg Rechenberg and Robert Savosnick were liberated from Sachsenhausen without the benefit of the White Buses. Thanks to the help of Norwegian officer Helmer Bonnevie, they returned on their own to Norway. Harry Meyer, who participated in the breakout by the Kvarstad vessels, was liberated from Sachsenhausen. Mendelsohn (1986, p. 153, p. 183))
- Theresienstadt: —at least one survivor. (Note: Pavel Fraenkl was liberated from Theresienstadt and returned to Norway by unknown means, where he had a distinguished career as a literary professor)

2015 saw the death of the last remaining survivor of those deported from Norway—Samuel Steinmann.

=== Aided by the organization behind the White Buses ===
Four Norwegian Jews were rescued by the White Buses. (Note: Josef Berg happened to be in Sachsenhausen when the White Buses arrived. Thanks to non-Jewish Norwegian prisoners, he was accepted on board the bus, one of only four Jews from Norway to be rescued by the operation; Eugen Keil returned to Norway from Sachsenhausen via the White Buses; Harry Meyer was in Sachsenhausen at the end of the war and was one of four Norwegian Jews rescued by the White Buses; Leif Wolfberg was rescued by the White Buses when his fellow non-Jewish Norwegian prisoners forged his papers to have him renamed Rolf Berg.) At least one prisoner at the Dachau concentration camp was denied—by an SS-soldier—leaving with the White Buses, because the prisoner allegedly was not considered a Norwegian since he was a Jew.

== Reactions ==
In trials in 1946 and 1948 regarding Knut Rød's role in the deportations, he was found not guilty. An Aftenposten article in 2014 said that the not guilty verdict has been called "the point of absolute zero in Norway's judicial history".

== Legacy ==
Individual deportees have been commemorated with stolpersteine on a number of sidewalks in Oslo.

== Notable survivors ==
- Otto Eisler
- Leo Eitinger
- Berthold Epstein
- Julius Paltiel
- Herman Sachnowitz
- Samuel Steinmann (lecturing witness of the Holocaust and last surviving deportee from Norway during World War II; burial (in 2015) attended by the king and the prime minister of Norway)

== See also ==
- Antisemitism in Norway
- Racial segregation in Norway
- List of Jewish deportees from Norway during World War II

== Sources ==
- Mendelsohn, Oskar (1986). Jødenes historie i Norge gjennom 300 år - Bind 2 1940-1985 (in Norwegian) (2nd ed.). Oslo: Universitetsforlaget. pp. 334–360. ISBN 82-00-02524-1.
- Ottosen, Kristian (1994). "Vedlegg 1". I slik en natt; historien om deportasjonen av jøder fra Norge (in Norwegian). Oslo: Aschehoug. pp. 334–360. ISBN 82-03-26049-7.
- Søbye, Espen (2003). Kathe, alltid vært i Norge (in Norwegian). Oslo: Oktober. ISBN 978-82-7094-926-7.
- Komissar, Vera (1992). Nådetid - norske jøder på flukt (in Norwegian). Oslo: Aschehoug. ISBN 82-03-17170-2.
- Berman, Irene Levin (2008). "Vi skal plukke poteter" - Flukten fra Holocaust (in Norwegian). Oslo: Orion. ISBN 978-82-458-0865-0.

== Literature ==
Stefansen, Arnt; Feinberg, Kai (1995). Fange nr 79108 vender tilbake [Prisoner no. 79108 returns]. Cappelen.
