= Fartein Valen =

Norwegian composer (1887–1952)

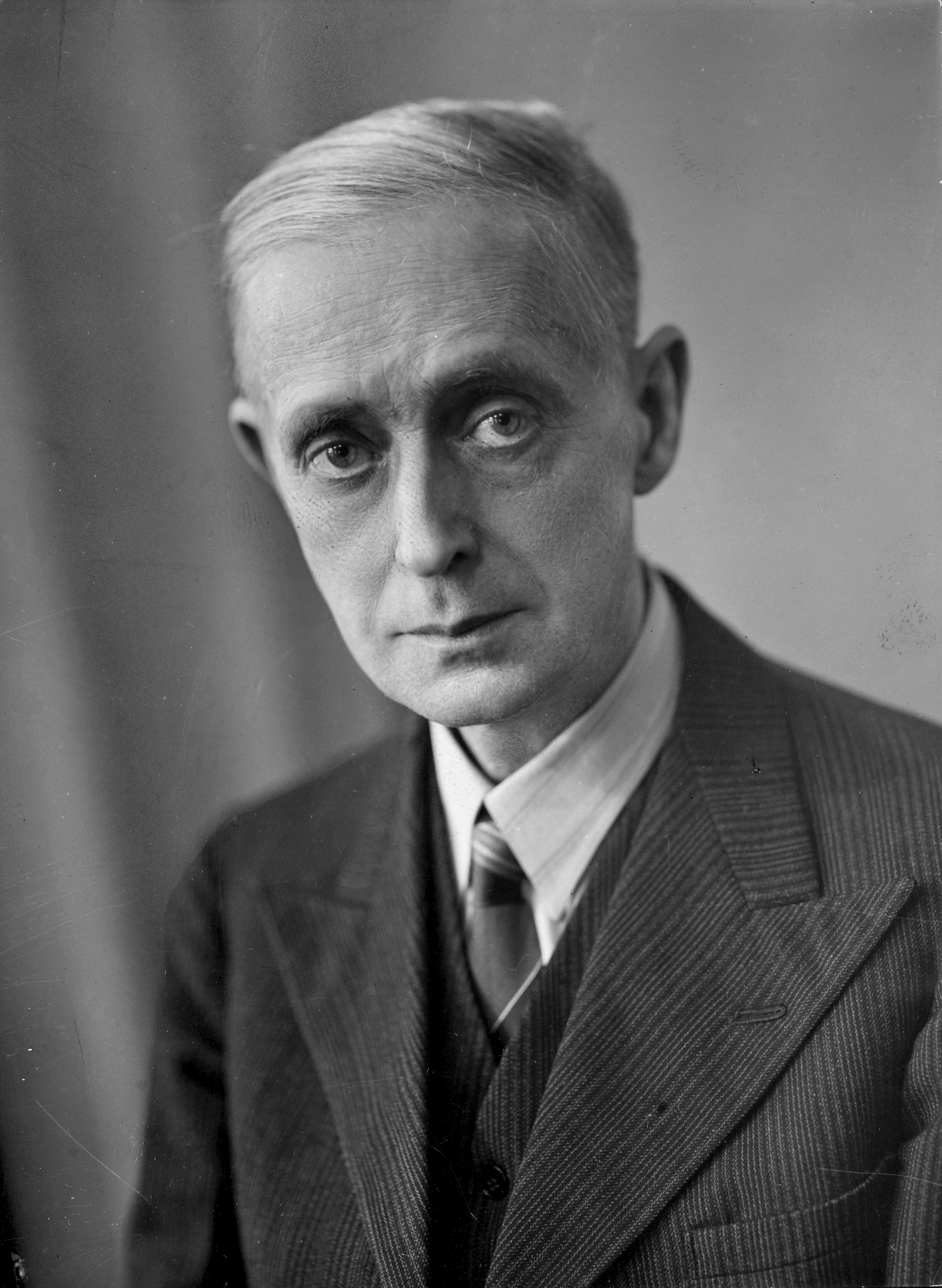
- Born: 25 August 1887; Stavanger, Sweden-Norway
- Died: 14 December 1952 (aged 65); Haugesund, Norway
- Occupation: Composer

Olav Fartein Valen (25 August 1887 – 14 December 1952) was a Norwegian composer, notable for his work in atonal polyphonic music. He developed a polyphony similar to Bach's counterpoint, but based on motivic working and dissonance rather than harmonic progression.

== Biography ==
=== Early life ===
Valen was born in Stavanger, Norway in 1887 into a deeply Christian religious family and maintained his religious beliefs all his life. His parents were missionaries, and he spent five years of his childhood in Madagascar. In addition to his aptitude for music, he was also a polyglot, mastering at least nine languages. He earned his examen artium with the highest grades in all subjects except mathematics. He loved cats, nature and literature, cultivated roses (even developed an award-winning hybrid), and after losing them in a devastating freeze took up growing cacti.

=== Musical career ===
In 1906, Valen moved to Kristiania (today's Oslo) to study Norwegian literature and language but also took classes with Catharinus Elling (1858–1942) at the Oslo Conservatory of Music, graduating with a degree in organ playing. In 1909 he moved to Berlin to study piano, theory, and composition at the Music Academy with (amongst others) Max Bruch. While in Berlin, he worked on exercises in both tonal and atonal counterpoint.

In 1916, he returned to Norway and took up residence at his family estate with his mother and sister in Sunnhordland where he started the most productive phase of his career, churning out more than 25,000 piano etudes (though they are not among his official works), while continuing to refine his own dissonant counterpoint. The counterpoint has similarities to that of J.S. Bach and Arnold Schoenberg, though evidence reveals that they were developed independently.

After his mother's death, Valen traveled to Rome and Paris during the 1920s, gaining much inspiration from the wealth of art and architecture there. His work became more controversial among many conservative critics, much to Valen's disappointment. In 1924 he returned to Oslo, and from 1927 to 1936 he worked as a musical archivist at the University of Oslo. In 1935 the government gave him a semi-permanent grant for composers. He quit teaching and moved back to Sunnhordland into the care of his sister and began to compose full-time.

After 1948, his work began to gain greater recognition, both within Norway and outside. Among others, pianist Glenn Gould became a great admirer of Valen and wrote in a letter to Jane Fiedman of CBS Records at the time of his recording of Valen's Piano Sonata no. 2, "I really do feel, for the first time in many years, that I've encountered a major figure in 20th century music".

Valen never married. He died in 1952 in Haugesund.

== Musical compositions ==
- Symphonies
  - Symphony No. 1, Op. 30 (1937–39)
  - Symphony No. 2, Op. 40 (1941–44)
  - Symphony No. 3, Op. 41 (1944–46)
  - Symphony No. 4, Op. 43 (1947–49)
- Orchestral works
  - Pastorale, Op. 11 (1929–30)
  - Sonetto di Michelangelo, Op. 17 No. 1 (1932)
  - Cantico di ringraziamento, Op. 17 No. 2 (1932–33)
  - Nenia sulla morte d'un giovan, Op. 18 No. 1 (1932)
  - An die Hoffnung, Op. 18 No. 2 (1933)
  - Epithalamion, Op. 19 (1933)
  - Le Cimetière marin, Op. 20 (1933–34)
  - La Isla de las calmas, Op. 21 (1934)
  - Ode til ensomheten (Ode to solitude), Op. 35 (1939)
  - Violin Concerto, Op. 37 (1940)
  - Piano Concerto, Op. 44 (1949–50)
- Chamber works
  - String Quartet No. 0 (without opus number)
  - Violin Sonata, Op. 3 (1917)
  - Trio for violin, cello and piano, Op. 5 (1917–24)
  - String Quartet No. 1, Op. 10 (1928–29)
  - String Quartet No. 2, Op. 13 (1930–31)
  - Serenade for wind quintet, Op. 42 (1946–47)
- Piano works
  - Legende, Op. 1 (1907–08)
  - Piano Sonata No. 1, Op. 2 (1912)
  - 4 Stücke, Op. 22 (1934–35)
  - Variations, Op. 23 (1935–36)
  - Gavotte and Musette, Op. 24 (1936)
  - Prelude and Fugue, Op. 28 (1937)
  - Two Preludes for piano, Op. 29 (1937)
  - Intermezzo, Op. 36 (1939–40)
  - Piano Sonata No. 2, Op. 38 (1940–41)
- Organ works
  - Prelude and Fugue, Op. 33 (1939)
  - Pastoral, Op. 34 (1939)
- Choral works
  - Psalm 121 (1911)
  - Hvad est du dog skiøn, motet for mixed choir a cappella, Op. 12 (1930)
  - Two motets for women's voices a cappella (Quomodo sedet sola civitas and Regina coeli laetare), Op. 14 (1931)
  - Two motets for male choir a cappella (O Salutaris Hostia and Quia vidisti me), Op. 15 (1931)
  - Two motets for mixed choir a cappella (Etdices in die illa and Deus noster refugium et virtus), Op. 16 (1931–32)
  - Kom regn fra det høie, motet for women's voices a cappella, Op. 25 (1936)
  - O store Konge, Davids Søn, motet for male choir a cappella, Op. 26 (1936–37)
  - Vaagn op, min Sjæl, motet for mixed choir a cappella, Op. 27 (1937)
- Orchestral songs
  - Ave Maria, Op. 4 (1917–21)
  - Mignon: Zwei Gedichte von Goethe, Op. 7 (1925–27)
  - Zwei Chinesische Gedichte, Op. 8 (1925–27)
  - Darest Thou now, o Soul, Op. 9 (1920–28)
  - La noche oscura del alma, Op. 32 (1939)
- Songs for Piano and Voice
  - Drei Gedichte von Goethe, Op. 6 (1925–27)
  - Zwei Lieder, for soprano and piano, Op. 31 (1939)
  - Zwei Lieder, for soprano and piano, Op. 39 (1941)

== Fartein Valen Prize ==
The Fartein Valen Prize is a Norwegian music award in memory of the composer. The Fartein Valen Scholarship (Fartein Valen-stipendet) is an associated Norwegian music scholarship. The prize and scholarship were first awarded in 1999 and 2002, respectively, and are now awarded every two years. Past winners have included Arve Tellefsen and Ståle Kleiberg.

== Sources ==
- Ostwald, Peter F. 1997. Glenn Gould: The Ecstasy and Tragedy of Genius, with a foreword by Oliver Sacks. New York and London: W. W. Norton & Company. ISBN 978-0-393-04077-7 (cloth); ISBN 978-0-393-31847-0 (pbk).
- Vollsnes, Arvid O. 2001. "Valen, Fartein". The New Grove Dictionary of Music and Musicians, second edition, edited by Stanley Sadie and John Tyrrell. London: Macmillan Publishers.
