= Ståle Kleiberg =

Norwegian classical composer and musicologist

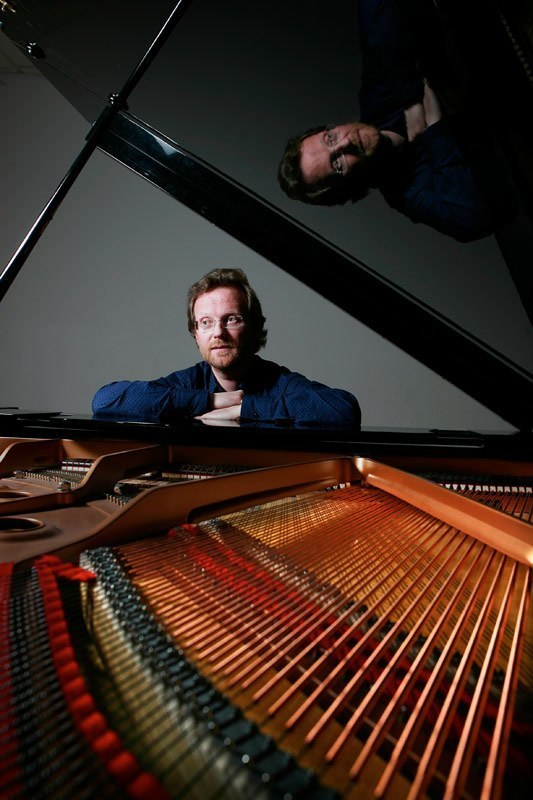
- Born: 8 March 1958 (age 68); Stavanger, Norway
- Occupations: Contemporary classical composer and musicologist

Ståle Kleiberg (born 8 March 1958) is a contemporary classical composer and musicologist from Norway.

== Biography ==
Kleiberg was born in Stavanger in 1958. He graduated from the University of Oslo with a degree in musicology and later from the Norwegian Academy of Music with a diploma degree in composition. In addition he has studied in England. Kleiberg has worked as a composer since 1981 when he received his first commission. He was appointed associate professor at the department of music at the University of Trondheim in 1986, and professor of music at the Norwegian University of Science and Technology (NTNU) in 2008.

== Works ==
Kleiberg's output ranges from chamber music to works for full orchestra; a number of these are the result of commissions from leading orchestras and ensembles. Kleiberg's works are often to be found on concert programmes. His 'Dopo' for cello and string orchestra was included on the TrondheimSoloist's recent tour of England. In the British journal 'Tempo' this work is described as having '...made a deep and lasting impression' and that 'Kleiberg weaves an angry expressionistic line of immense power and virtuosity'. Among his works for full orchestra is the symphony ‘Klokkeskjæret’ (‘The Bell Reef’), commissioned by the Stavanger Symphony Orchestra. Kleiberg has also completed a number of major works commissioned by the Trondheim Symphony Orchestra, and was their composer-in-residence for the 2000/2001 season. Three of his works that were performed during that season have been recorded on a portrait CD with Kleiberg's orchestral music. Another portrait CD features five of his chamber works, and he is also represented at other recordings with single pieces.

'Requiem – for victims of Nazi persecution' is a central work in Kleiberg's production. In addition to the parts from the Latin Mass, new texts by the Scottish poet and play writer Edwin Morgan are included. This trilogy also includes the orchestral work 'Lamento: Cissi Klein in memoriam' and 'Dopo'. Many of Kleiberg's works have a literary source. Poetic images often give rise to musical associations, and these imagined sounds and sound-textures form the basis of the inspiration for the composer's work. One excellent example of this is the hour-long 'Rosevinduet' (‘The Rose Window’) for narrator and chamber orchestra, commissioned by the Olavsfestdagene in Trondheim in 1992, and later released on CD.

2015 saw Kleiberg's Mass for Modern Man premiered at Trondheim's Nidaros Cathedral as the opening concert of the St. Olav Festival, and the work saw its German premiere in Münchner Dom in November the same year. His opera oratory David and Bathsheba also saw a Nidaros Cathedral premiere in 2008 to critical acclaim and has since seen a number of international performances.

== Awards ==
In 1999 Kleiberg was awarded the 'Fartein Valen Prize', and was composer-in-residence during the Valen Days the following year.

Kleiberg has received two Grammy nominations: in 2009 for the album Treble and Bass with the Trondheim Symphony Orchestra and soloists Marianne Thorsen (violin) and Göran Sjölin (double bass) as well as the Trondheim Symphony Orchestra's 2013 recording of his opera David and Bathsheba.

== Production ==
=== Selected works ===
- Mass for Modern Man (2015)
- Ruf und Nachtklang (2013)
- The Sheperds and the Angels (2010)
- Aske (2010)
- Hymn to Love (2009)
- David and Bathsheba (2008), opera
- Dopo
- Haugtussa-sanger
- Klokkeskjæret, symphony
- Concerto for violin and orchestra (2005)
- Concerto for double bass and orchestra (1999)
- Lamento: Cissi Klein in memoriam
- Requiem for the victims of Nazi persecution, for 3 soloists, mixed choir and orchestra (premiered in Nidarosdomen 2002).
- Rosevinduet (1992)
- Sonata for flute and piano (1987)
- String quartet (1985)
- Two poems by Montale (1986), for flute, oboe, soprano and piano
- Three Shakespeare sonnets (1982)
- Trio for violin, cello and piano (1994)

== Discography ==
- Trondheim Symphony Orchestra, Mari Eriksmoen, Johannes Weiser, Mass for Modern Man (2017)
- Marianne Thorsen, Øyvind Gimse, Jørgen Larsen, Bård Monsen, Ole Wuttudal, Mezzotints -chamber music by Ståle Kleiberg (2015)
- Henning Kraggerud, Edvard Munch Suite (2013)
- Trondheim Symphony Orchestra, Ståle Kleiberg: David and Bathsheba (2013)
- Mainzer Virtuosi, Borissova Irina, Langer Agnes, Khakhalin Dmitry, Kleiberg, Seabourne, Arnold, Atterberg (2013)
- Jorunn Marie Bratlie and Ivar Anton Waagaard, Norsk Musikk for To Klaver (2012)
- Guro Kleven Hagen, Miriam Helms Alien, Sara Chen, Nine Solos For Nine Violinists (2012)
- Nidaros Cathedral Choir, Torbjørn Dyrud, Trondheim Soloists, Vivianne Sydnes, Nidaros (2010)
- Trondheim Symphony Orchestra, Treble & Bass: Concertos by Ståle Kleiberg (2009)
- Washington national cathedral choir and Orchestra, Requiem – for the victims of Nazi persecution (2004)
- Rolf Gupta, Ståle Kleiberg, Trondheim Symphony Orchestra, Kleiberg - the Bell Reef (2003)
- Bjarne Fiskum, Trondheim Soloists (2002)
- Knut Risan, Ståle Kleiberg, Stein Mehren, Rosevinduet : for kammerorkester og resitatør (1999)
- Nidaros Cathedral Choir, Sonetto di Tasso (1999)
- Collegium Musicum Carinthia, Moskva National Quartet, Musica Concertante (1998)
- Ståle Kleiberg, Chamber Music (1997)
- Per Fridtjov Bonsaksen, New Church Music from the Nidaros Cathedral (1992)
