= MS Gotenland =

Cargo ship built in Denmark in World War 2

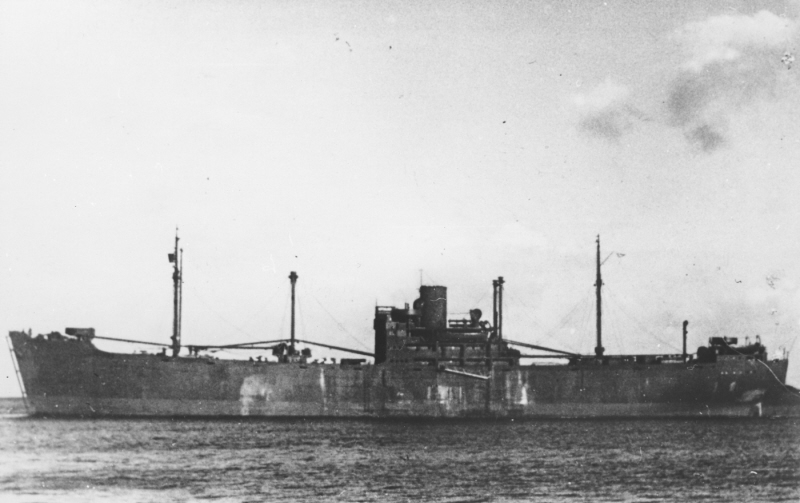
- Gotenland

History
- Name: 1942: Gotenland; 1945: Hopeville; 1967: Oinoussian Hope; 1968: Esperanza
- Owner: 1942: Kriegsmarine; 1945: Skibs-A/S Steinstad; 1957: Skibs-A/S Siljestad; 1967: Argyros Cia SA
- Operator: 1942: Norddeutscher Lloyd; 1945: A. F. Klaveness & Co; 1967: Panagiotis A Lemos & Co Ltd
- Port of registry: 1942: (Nazi Germany); 1945: (Norway) Oslo; 1967: (Greece) Piraeus
- Builder: Burmeister & Wain, Copenhagen
- Laid down: 1940
- Completed: November 1942
- Identification: 1945: call sign LLNZ
- Fate: Scrapped 1970

General characteristics
- Type: cargo ship
- Tonnage: 5,312 GRT, 3,184 NRT, 8,800 DWT
- Length: 440.0 ft (134.1 m) overall; 424.7 ft (129.4 m) registered
- Beam: 56.4 ft (17.2 m)
- Depth: 26.3 ft (8.0 m)
- Decks: 2
- Propulsion: 1 × 9-cylinder two-stroke diesel engine; 1 × screw
- Speed: 13 1/2 knots (25 km/h)
- Sensors & processing systems: by 1947: wireless direction finding; echo sounding device; gyrocompass; by 1959: radar

MS Gotenland was a cargo motor ship that was built in Denmark during the Second World War and scrapped in China in 1970. Her first operator was the German Norddeutscher Lloyd (NDL) line. In 1945 she passed to Norwegian ownership and was renamed Hopeville. In 1967 she was acquired by Greek owners, who at first renamed her Oinoussian Hope, and then changed her name to Esperanza.

In 1943 Germany used Gotenland to deport 158 Jews from Norway to Germany. Only six or seven of the deportees survived the war.

== Building ==
In 1940 Burmeister & Wain in Copenhagen, Denmark was building the ship for A. F. Klaveness & Co of Norway. However, in April 1940 Germany invaded Denmark, and the Kriegsmarine requisitioned the uncompleted ship. In November 1942 she was completed as Gotenland, and the Kriegsmarine appointed NDL to manage her. Her Master in NDL service was Captain Heinz Vollmers.

The ship's lengths were 440.0 ft (134.1 m) overall and 424.7 ft (129.4 m) registered. Her beam was 56.4 ft (17.2 m), and her depth was 26.3 ft (8.0 m). Her tonnages were 5,312 GRT, 3,184 NRT, and 8,800 DWT. She had four holds and five hatches. She had 15 derricks: one of 25 tons and 14 of five tons.

The ship had a single screw, driven by a Burmeister & Wain nine-cylinder, single-acting, two-stroke diesel engine. It gave her a speed of 13 1/2 knots (25 km/h).

== Gotenland ==
In November 1942 the German authorities in occupied Norway had deported hundreds of Norwegian Jews to concentration camps in occupied Poland aboard the ships Donau and Monte Rosa. In February 1943 they used Gotenland to deport Norwegian Jews to Germany.

On February 24, 1943, 158 Jewish prisoners were taken from Bredtveit Prison and Grini detention camp to the port of Oslo, where they were embarked aboard Gotenland. 71 were adult women, 63 were adult men, and 24 were children born during or after 1924. Embarkation took all day, and Gotenland left Oslo at 0500 hrs the next morning.The Gestapo officer Klaus Grossmann commanded the German guards aboard Gotenland on the voyage.

On February 27 Gotenland docked in Stettin in Germany. There the prisoners were loaded into freight cars, in which they were taken to Berlin. In Berlin they were made to sign over all of their assets to the German state. The next day they were sent on to Auschwitz. On arrival in Auschwitz, all men under 18 and over about 45–50 years, and almost all women, were selected for immediate execution in one of the gas chambers. Only 26 to 28 of the deportees were selected to be retained as forced labourers. They were put to work in Monowitz-Buna. Only six or seven of the prisoners transported with Gotenland survived the war.

On January 29, 1945 Gotenland was in the Baltic off Libau during an air raid. A bomb hit her, causing substantial damage. She returned to Danzig for repairs to her deck and forecastle.

On January 30, 1945 the S-13 sank Wilhelm Gustloff, killing more than 9,000 people aboard. Gotenland, still damaged from the bombing off Libau, took part in rescuing some of the survivors from the sea.

== Hopeville ==
In May 1945 Germany capitulated, and on August 31 Gotenland was finally delivered to Klaveness & Co, who had ordered her at the beginning of the war. Klaveness renamed her Hopeville and registered her in Oslo. Her Norwegian call sign was LLNZ.

By 1946 Hopeville's navigation equipment included wireless direction finding, an echo sounding device, and gyrocompass. In 1957 Hopeville's ownership was transferred from Skibs-A/S Steinstad to Skibs-A/S Siljestad, but Klaveness & Co remained her managers. By 1959 her navigation equipment included radar. In 1963 she was laid up from January 10 until March 21 in Arendal in southern Norway.

== Oinoussian Hope and Esperanza ==
In 1967 Argyros Cia. SA bought Hopeville, renamed her Oinoussian Hope, and registered her in Piraeus. Panagiotis A Lemos & Co Ltd of London were her managers. In 1968 her owners renamed her Esperanza, but kept the same managers.

In 1970 she was sold for scrap. On April 15 that year she arrived in Shanghai to be broken up.

== Bibliography ==
- Harings, Egon (2018). Germany and two World Wars From the German Reich to the end of the Nazi regime (1 ed.). Hamburg. ISBN 978-3-7469-5499-8. OCLC 1057381729.
- Kieser, Egbert (2012). Prussian Apocalypse: The Fall of Danzig, 1945. Pen and Sword. ISBN 978-1-78346-120-2.
- Lloyd's Register of Shipping (PDF). Vol. I.–Steamers and Motorships of 300 tons gross and over. London: Lloyd's Register of Shipping. 1945 – via Southampton City Council.
- Lloyd's Register of Shipping. Vol. Steamers and Motorships of 300 tons gross and over, Steamers and motorships under 300 tons, trawlers, tugs, dredgers, &c., Sailing vessels, List of ship owners, &c. London: Lloyd's Register of Shipping. 1946 – via Internet Archive.
- Mendelsohn, Oskar (1987). The History of the Jews in Norway. Oslo: Universitetsforl. ISBN 8200025241.
- Ottosen, Kristian (1995). Bak lås og slå : historen om norske kvinner og menn i Hitlers fengsler og tukthus (in Norwegian) (new ed.). Oslo: Aschehoug. ISBN 82-03-26079-9. OCLC 478697792.
- Register Book. Vol. I.–Register of Ships. London: Lloyd's Register of Shipping. 1957 – via Internet Archive.
- Register Book. Vol. I.–Register of Ships. London: Lloyd's Register of Shipping. 1959 – via Internet Archive.
- Uenuma, Francine (January 29, 2020). "The Deadliest Disaster at Sea Killed Thousands, Yet Its Story Is Little-Known. Why?". Smithsonian. Smithsonian Institution.
- Wetterholm, Claes-Göran (2021). Sea of Death, The Baltic 1945. Cheltenham: The History Press. ISBN 978-0-7509-9698-3. OCLC 1261367624.
