= Berthold Epstein =

Czech pediatrician (1890–1962)

Berthold Epstein (1 April 1890 – 9 June 1962) was a Czech pediatrician, professor and scientist. He was conscripted as a doctor in the Auschwitz concentration camp during World War II.

== Life and career ==
Berthold Epstein was born into a Jewish family in Plzeň in 1890. As an adult, he became professor and director at a children's clinic affiliated with the German Hospital in Prague, and married Ottilie née Eckstein.

In reaction to the escalation of World War II, Epstein travelled to Norway on 15 March 1940. Accepted on the recommendation of the Norwegian pediatric association, he was also encouraged to apply for the position as the head of the pediatric clinic at Rikshospitalet. Epstein was among the small number of refugees licensed to practice medicine in Norway before the German invasion on 9 April.

The Nazi persecution of Jews put an end to his Norwegian pediatrics career, and he instead conducted research on tuberculosis until his arrest on 27 October 1942. His arrest was followed by his deportation on the SS Donau on 26 November the same year.

== Auschwitz ==
Having been deported from Norway to Nazi-occupied Poland, Epstein was then transported to Auschwitz-Birkenau. There, he assisted the notoriously unethical Josef Mengele with experiments concerning a possible treatment of noma, a deadly and disfiguring form of malnutrition-induced gangrene. About 3,000 people died due to this research, which included deliberately infecting healthy individuals.

During Epstein's captivity as a physician at Auschwitz, members of his own family were among the camp's victims. Several efforts were made—among others by Prince Carl of Sweden—to liberate Epstein from the camp, but none succeeded; and Epstein remained at the facility until the war's end.

== Post war ==
Having survived the war, Epstein later testified in the Soviet war crimes trials on genocide. He lived in Prague for the remainder of his life, serving as chair of the city's Bulovka Hospital pediatric clinic from 1949 until his death in 1962, at the age of 72.
