= German training ship Bremse =

German training ship

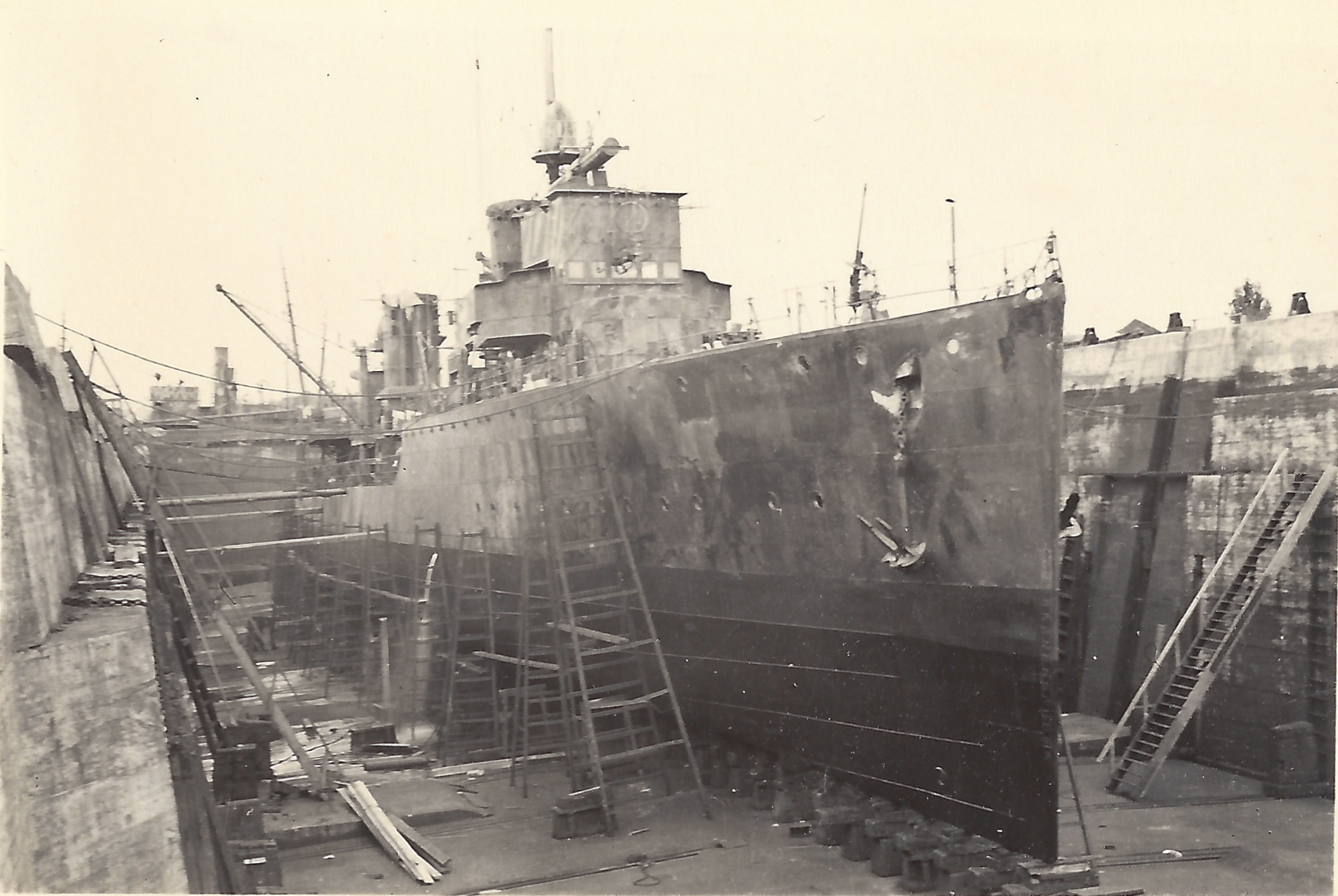
- Bremse in dry dock, 1940-41

History

Nazi Germany
- Name: Bremse
- Laid down: 1931 by Reichsmarinewerft Wilhelmshaven
- Launched: June 14, 1932
- Commissioned: July 7, 1933
- Fate: Sunk on September 6, 1941, by British cruisers.

General characteristics
- Class & type: Training ship
- Displacement: 1,870 tons
- Length: 345 ft (105 m)
- Beam: 31 ft (9.4 m)
- Draft: 9 ft (2.7 m)
- Propulsion: MAN diesel engines, two shafts, 28,400 shp (21.2 MW)
- Speed: 29.1 knots (53.9 km/h; 33.5 mph)
- Range: 3,000 nautical miles (5,600 km)
- Complement: 285
- Armament: 4 × 12.7 cm SK C/34 naval guns; 4 × 3.7 cm SK C/30 AA guns; 8 × 2 cm FlaK 30; 250 × EMC mines
- Armor: 30 mm belt, 25 mm deck

Bremse was built as an artillery training ship (Artillerieschulschiff) of the Nazi German Kriegsmarine with a secondary function as a test bed for new marine diesel engines later installed in German panzerschiffe. During World War II, she operated as an escort ship until her sinking in September 1941.

== History ==
Bremse was commissioned on June 14, 1933, and attached to the artillery training school at Kiel, to replace older predecessors. In 1933 she underwent repairs and a complete refit; her mast was shortened to improve stability and her artillery director was removed.

In 1939 the ship was used in the film Der letzte Apell as the British scout cruiser HMS Amphion; two additional dummy funnels were added.

== Wartime career ==
During the Invasion of Poland in September 1939, Bremse escorted the auxiliary minelayers Tannenberg and Hansestadt Danzig and in October, she escorted troop transports in the Baltic. She then returned to the artillery school in Kiel until March 1940.

In April 1940, during Operation Weserübung, Bremse participated in the attack on Bergen. She was shelled by Norwegian coastal artillery and hit by two 21 cm rounds; she was subsequently repaired in Stavanger. Later, on November 1 Bremse was accidentally rammed by the steamship Donau off Bergen, suffering minor damage.

In June 1941, Bremse was sent back to Kiel for escort duty. On July 30 she was bombed by British Albacore torpedo bombers and Fulmar fighters from the aircraft carrier HMS Victorious but escaped unharmed.

== Sinking ==
On September 6, 1941, in Hammerfjord, while escorting the troop transports Trautenfels and Barcelona, Bremse was intercepted and attacked by the British cruisers HMS Nigeria and Aurora. Bremse drew the cruisers away from the transports, so that they could escape, but Nigeria rammed her, cutting Bremse in half and sinking her. (Some sources give an alternative outcome, reporting that the Nigeria was damaged by a mine and Bremse sunk by gunfire.) 160 men, over half of her crew, died.
