= Julius Paltiel =

Norwegian concentration camp survivor

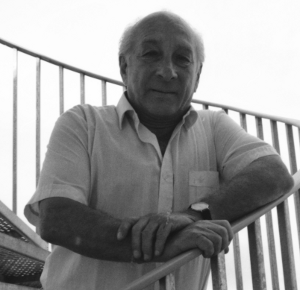
Julius Paltiel

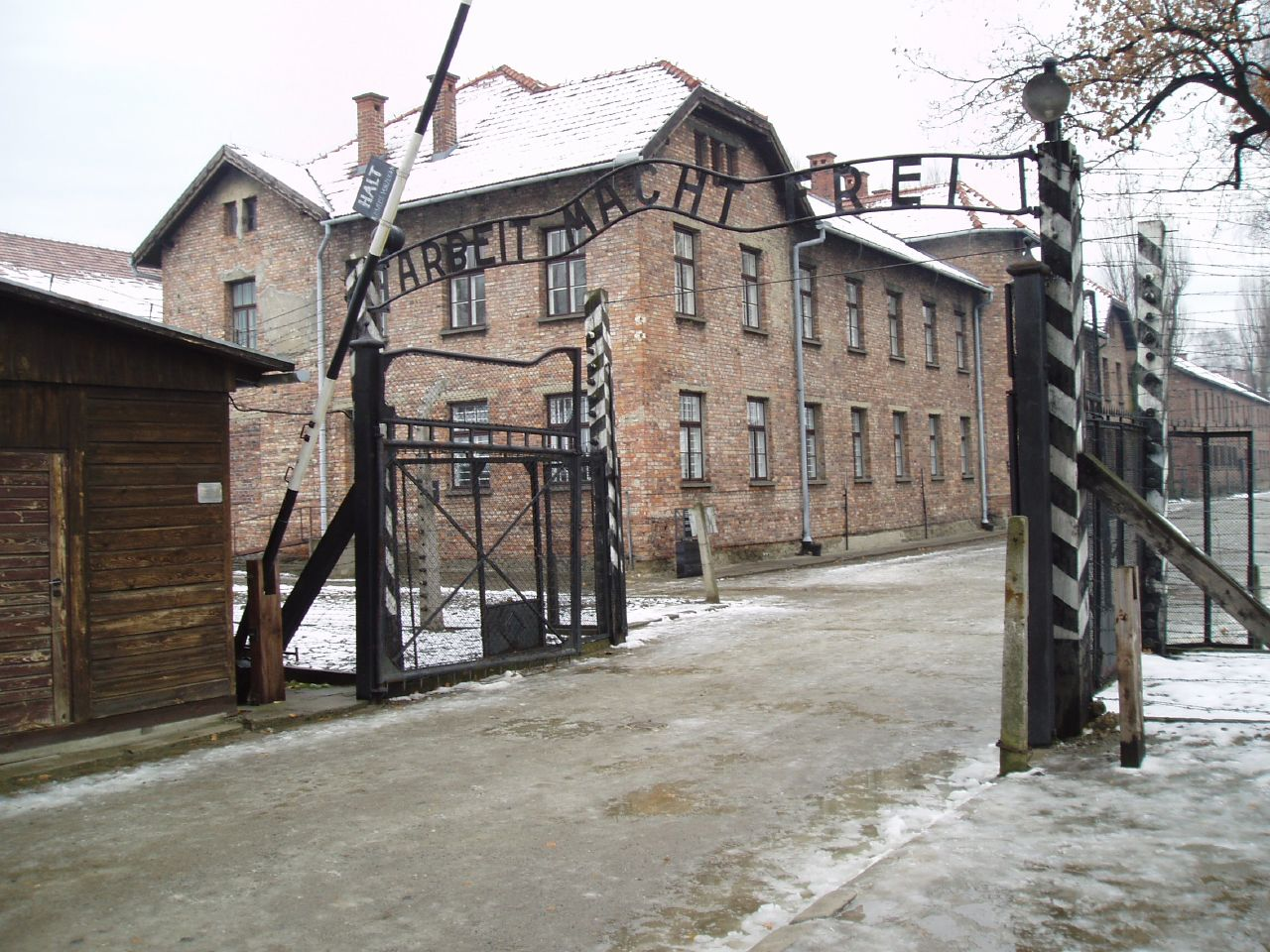
Auschwitz concentration camp, main gate

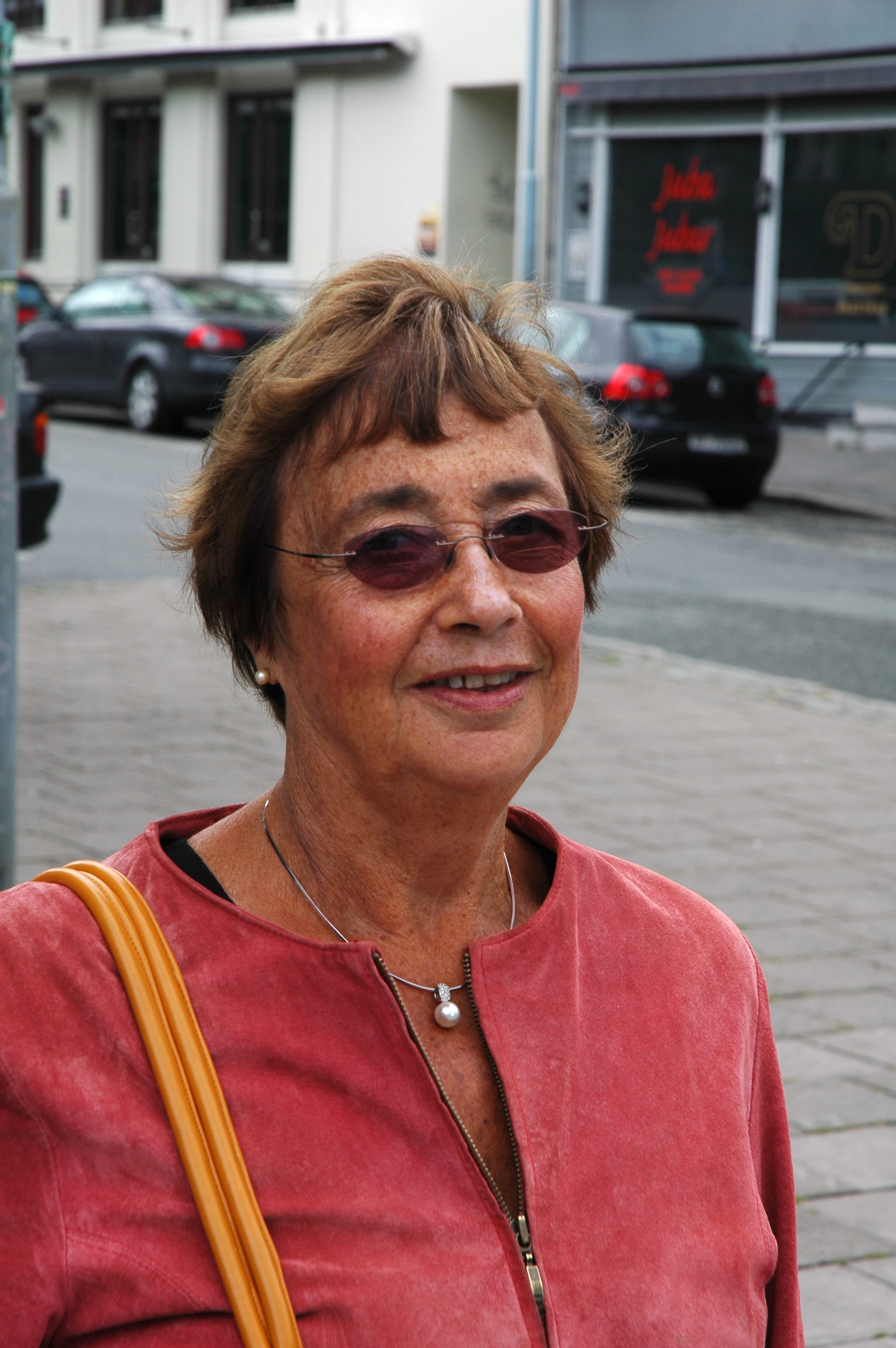
Vera Komissar

Julius Paltiel (4 July 1924 – 7 March 2008) was one of the 26 Norwegian Jews who returned from Auschwitz. For their efforts in telling about the atrocities in the Nazi extermination camps, both Paltiel and his widow were awarded St. Olav's Medal, he in 2004 and she in 2016. Paltiel was given a Norwegian state funeral, attended by King Harald V.

Personal life: as early as 1992, he traveled back to the Auschwitz concentration camp, together with a journalist.

== During World War II ==
During the Second World War, Paltiel's family were textile merchants in Trondheim. On 6 October 1942, he and his family were arrested and sent to Falstad concentration camp, where they stayed until they were deported to Auschwitz on 24 February 1943. When the Russians advanced to Poland in January 1945, the Germans evacuated 66,000 Jewish prisoners, and sent them on a death march to Buchenwald. At the time of his arrival there, Paltiel's weight was 39 kg.

One day, the prisoners got the message that the Scandinavians were going to be released and sent in the white buses back to their home countries, but to Paltiel's misfortune, Quisling had removed the Norwegian Jews' citizenship so they were not included on the evacuation lists. On 11 April 1945, Paltiel and four other Norwegian Jews were saved by the Americans, after taking numbered clothing from dead non-Jews.

== Death ==
Paltiel died at the age of 83 and was buried in Trondheim, the city where he was born. The government of Norway decided to honor Paltiel by giving him a state funeral. Prime minister Jens Stoltenberg said: "With Julius Paltiel, Norway has lost a central witness from the Nazi extermination camps during the Second World War. As one of the few Norwegian Jews that survived, Paltiel has until the last been a clear voice for all who wanted to learn from his and his generation's experiences."

The funeral was attended by King Harald V of Norway, Minister of Culture Trond Giske and Evangelical-Lutheran Bishop of Nidaros Finn Wagle among others.

== Family ==
He was survived by his wife, the Danish-born author Vera Komissar, and his two adult children by his first wife Rita who died in 1987.

== Literature ==
- Aftenposten: Julius Paltiel er død (in Norwegian)
- Trønder-Avisa: Tok farvel med Julius Paltiel (in Norwegian)
- Norwegians in Auschwitz on YouTube (in Norwegian) English subtitles
