= SS Donau (1929) =

German cargo steamship (1929–1945)

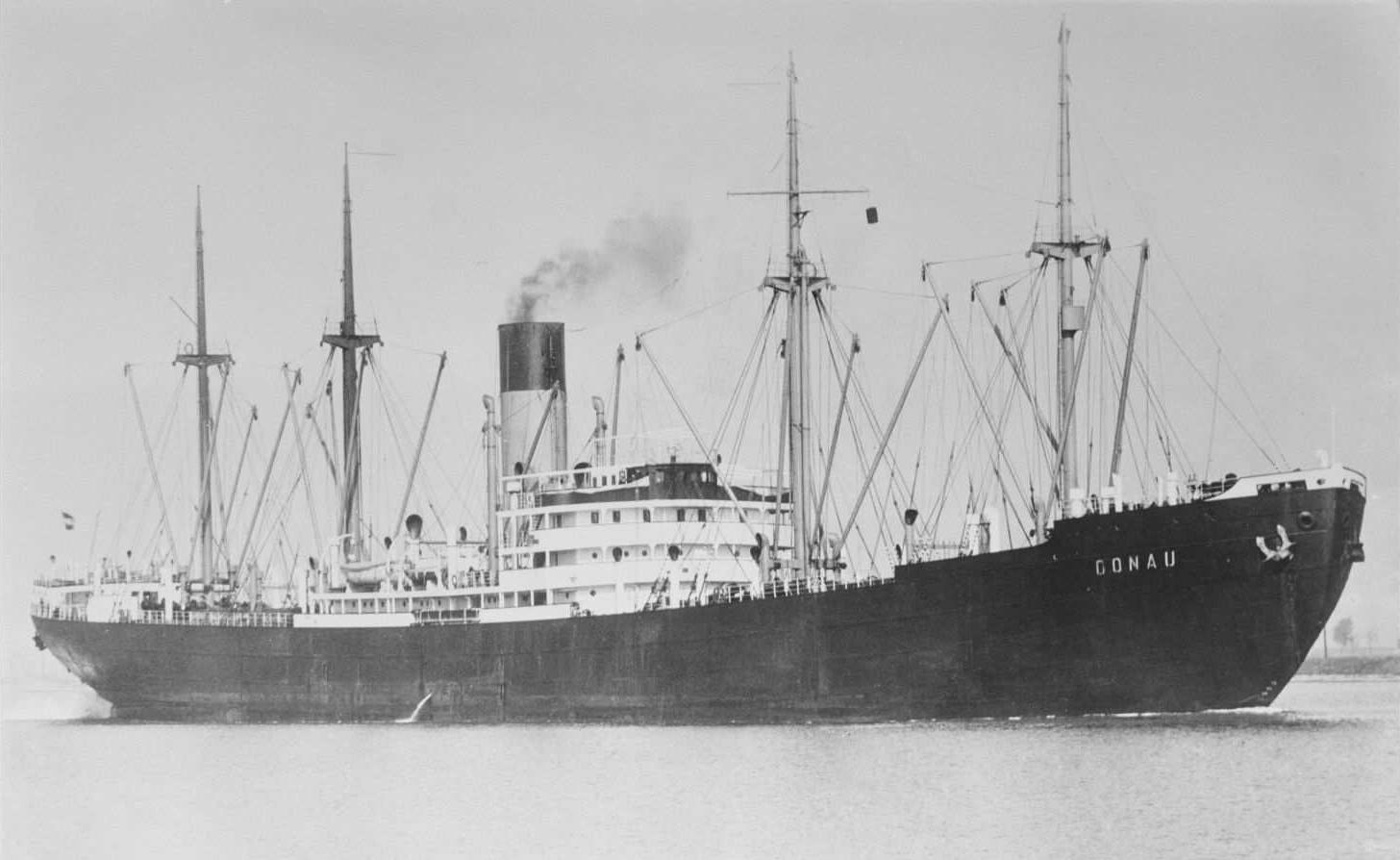
- Donau, showing her Maierform bow

History

Germany
- Name: Donau
- Namesake: Danube
- Owner: Norddeutscher Lloyd
- Operator: 1939–45: Kriegsmarine
- Port of registry: Bremen
- Route: 1930–39: Bremen – Panama Canal – Los Angeles – San Francisco
- Builder: DeSchiMAG Vulcan, Hamburg
- Yard number: 214
- Launched: 25 March 1929
- Completed: 6 June 1929
- Identification: until 1933: code letters QMJS; by 1934: call sign DOBR
- Fate: Sunk by limpet mines, 1945; raised and scrapped, 1952

General characteristics
- Type: refrigerated cargo ship
- Tonnage: 9,026 GRT, 5,637 NRT, 12,140 DWT
- Length: 521.0 ft (158.8 m)
- Beam: 63.5 ft (19.4 m)
- Depth: 31.0 ft (9.4 m)
- Decks: 2
- Installed power: 1000 NHP; 6,500 ihp
- Propulsion: 1 × triple expansion engine; 1 × exhaust steam turbine; 1 × screw
- Speed: 14 knots (26 km/h)
- Capacity: holds included 42,518 cubic feet (1,204 m^{3}) refrigerated space
- Crew: 63
- Sensors & processing systems: as built: wireless direction finding; submarine signalling; by 1937: echo sounding device
- Armament: In WW2: anti-aircraft guns; depth charges
- Notes: sister ship: Isar

SS Donau was a Norddeutscher Lloyd (NDL) refrigerated cargo steamship that was built in Germany in 1929 and sunk in occupied Norway in 1945. In the 1930s she sailed mostly between Bremen and the West Coast of the United States via the Panama Canal.

In the Second World War the Kriegsmarine used Donau for transport. Mostly she took troops, horses, and supplies from Germany and occupied Denmark to occupied Norway. She also made at least two trips to Finland. In 1942 the SS and Gestapo used Donau to deport 529 Jews from Norway to Stettin, whence they were taken by train to Auschwitz. Only nine of her deportees survived.

Donau survived an accidental collision in 1940 and grounding in 1942. Two Norwegian resistance divers sank her on the 16th of January 1945. Her wreck was raised and scrapped in 1952.

== Building ==
In 1928–29 Deutsche Schiff- und Maschinenbau built a pair of sister ships at its Vulcan shipyard in Hamburg for NDL. Isar was built as yard number 213, launched on 23 January 1929, and completed on 4 May. Donau was built as yard number 214, launched on 25 March 1929, and completed on 6 June. They were relatively large cargo ships for their time. Donau's registered length was 521.0 ft (158.8 m), her beam was 63.5 ft (19.4 m), and her depth was 31.0 ft (9.4 m). Her tonnages were 9,026 GRT, 5,637 NRT, and 12,140 DWT. 42,518 cubic feet (1,204 m^{3}) of her holds were refrigerated, and she had berths for 16 passengers. Each ship had four masts, with derricks for handling cargo.

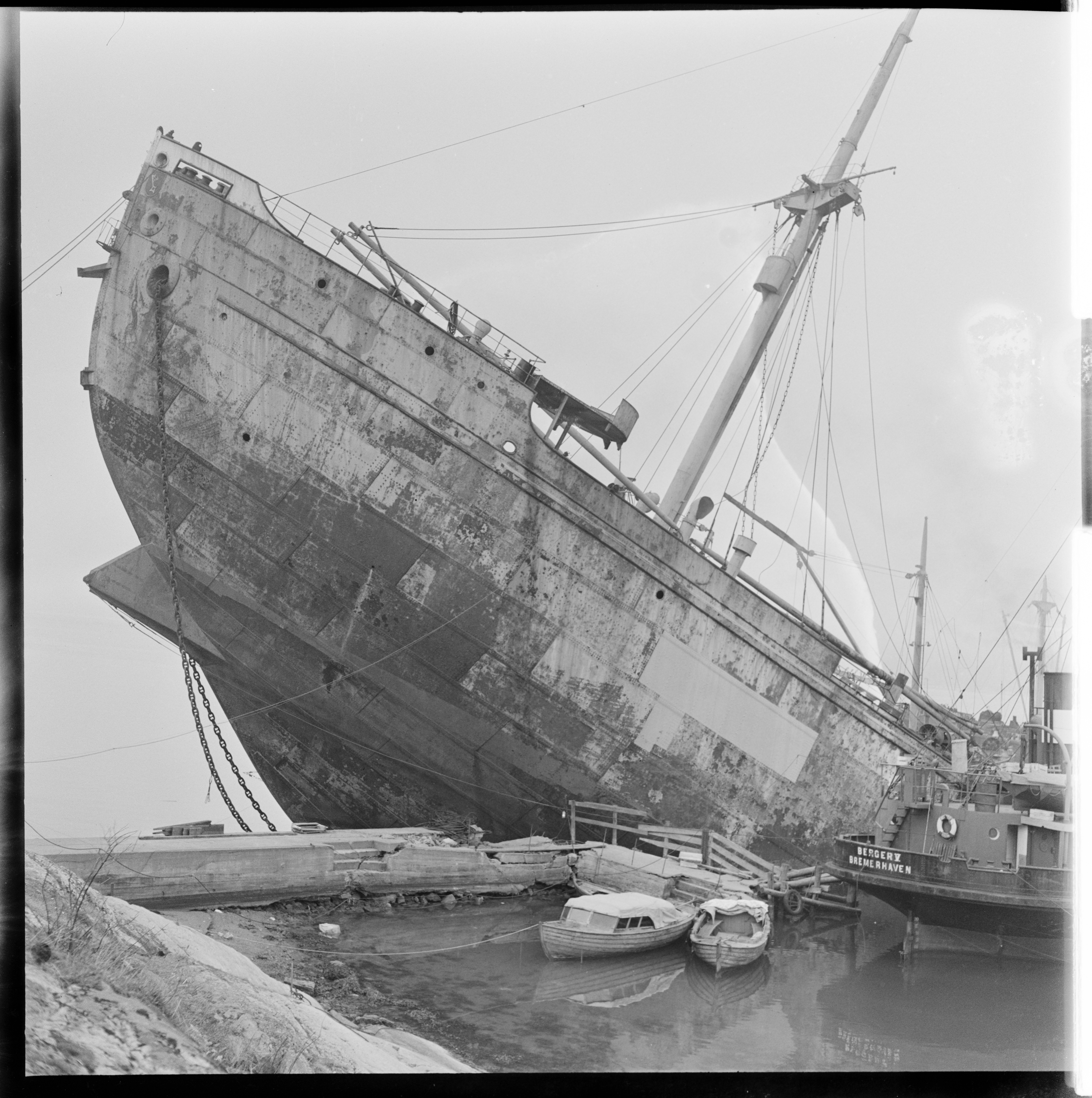
1952 photograph of Donau being salvaged. Her Maierform bow has been raised above the water, showing the part of its profile that would normally be below the waterline.

Isar and Donau each had a single screw, driven by a three-cylinder triple expansion engine, augmented by an exhaust steam turbine that drove the same propeller shaft. The combined power of Donau's engines was rated at 1,000 NHP or 6,500 ihp, and gave her a speed of 14 knots (26 km/h). Isar and Donau each had a Maierform bow to reduce water resistance.

As built, Donau's navigation equipment included wireless direction finding and submarine signalling. By 1937 she had an echo sounding device. NDL registered Donau at Bremen. Her code letters were QMJS. By 1934 these were superseded by the call sign DOBR.

== Peacetime service ==
From 1930 until 1933 Donau made at least six voyages from Bremen to Los Angeles and San Francisco via the Panama Canal. In 1937 she sailed from Bremen to Brisbane and Sydney. In 1938 she again sailed to San Francisco via the Panama Canal, but calling also in El Salvador, and at Puerto San José in Guatemala. In 1939 she twice sailed to Vancouver via the Panama Canal, Los Angeles and San Francisco.

On 17 August 1939 Donau left Hamburg bound for Los Angeles, San Francisco, Seattle, and Vancouver. On 25 August she arrived at Antwerp, and the next day she was recalled to Bremen.

== Second World War service ==
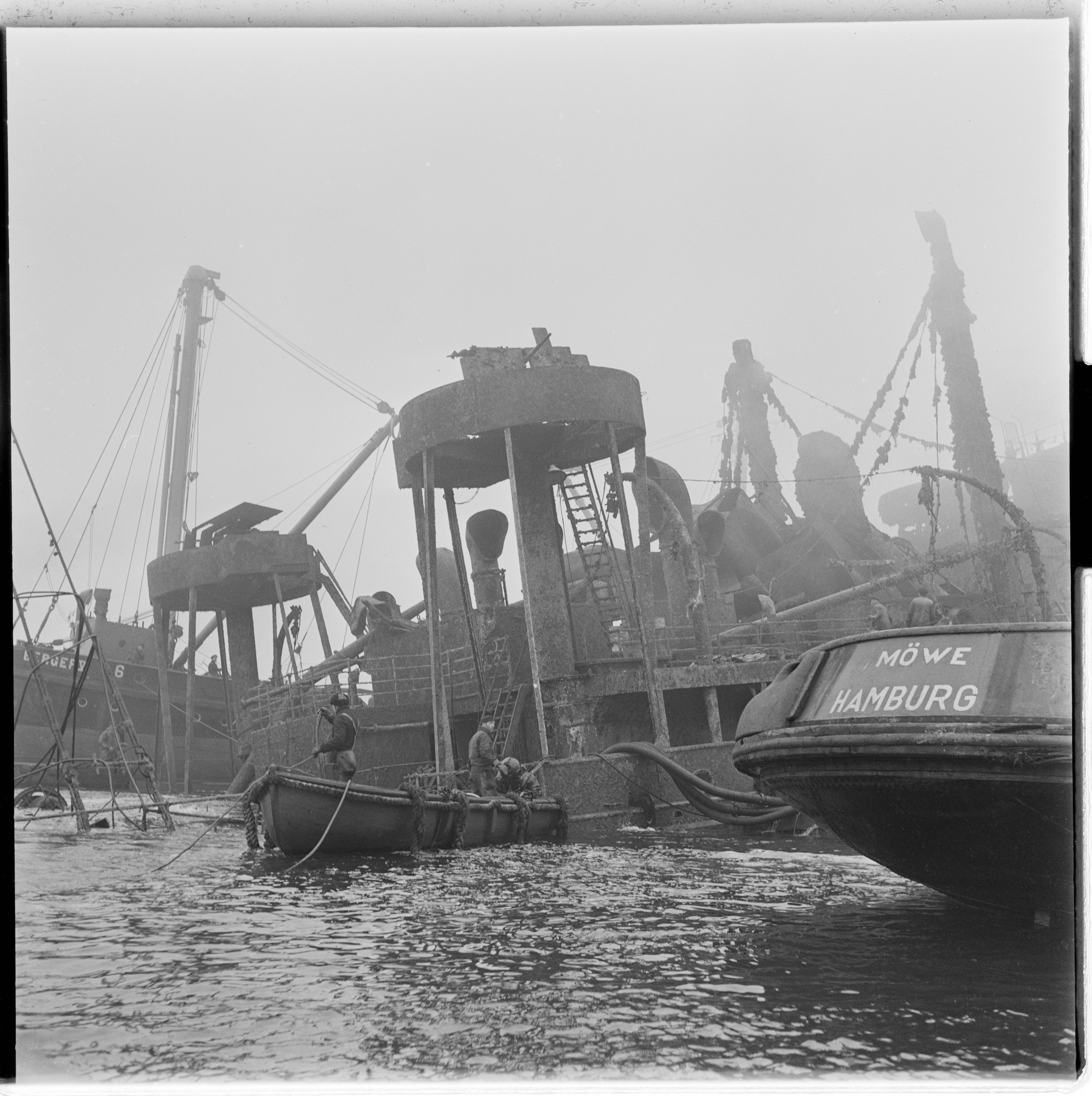
1952 close-up of Donau being salvaged. It shows two of her anti-aircraft guns on their raised platforms.

On 21 September 1939 the Kriegsmarine requisitioned Donau, and ordered her to Hamburg to serve as a troop ship to East Prussia. She was armed with anti-aircraft guns and depth charges. On 12 November she left Stettin. In December she carried 1,250 passengers from Riga to Danzig, and also worked from Helsinki to Tallinn.

In April 1940 Donau was one of six NDL ships that took part in Operation Weserübung, the German invasion of Denmark and Norway. Donau arrived in Oslo in Norway on 23 April, and again on 9 May. On 15 May she left Oslo in a convoy to Frederikshavn in Denmark. She sailed in convoys from Hals, Denmark to Oslo on 11–12 June and 25–26 June.

On 11 July 1940 Donau was designated to take part in Operation Sea Lion. On 22 September she left Antwerp with the NDL ships Isar and Warthe on the orders of the head of maritime transport in occupied Norway.

On 1 November 1940 Donau accidentally rammed the German training ship Bremse in the roadstead off Frederikshavn. Framnæs Mekaniske Værksted in Sandefjord, Norway, repaired her between 4 and 14 November.

On 6 June 1941 Donau and four other merchant ships left Stettin in a convoy to Finland. They formed the second squadron of Operation Blaufuchs I, carrying 3,852 men, 621 horses, 625 vehicles and 398 tons of supplies. On 9 June the squadron reached the ports of Vaasa and Kaskinen.

From June to August 1941 Donau sailed in small convoys supplying German forces occupying Norway. She sailed from Aalborg in Denmark and Stettin in Germany, making trips to Kristiansand, Kirkenes, Tromsø, and Honningsvåg.

On 28 January 1942 Donau left Stettin, with the German icebreaker Castor breaking the ice for her. The pair called at Copenhagen, where they left on 6 February, and arrived in Oslo on 8 February. On 18 August Donau became a transport ship for the Organisation Todt. On 26–28 October she was in Bergen.

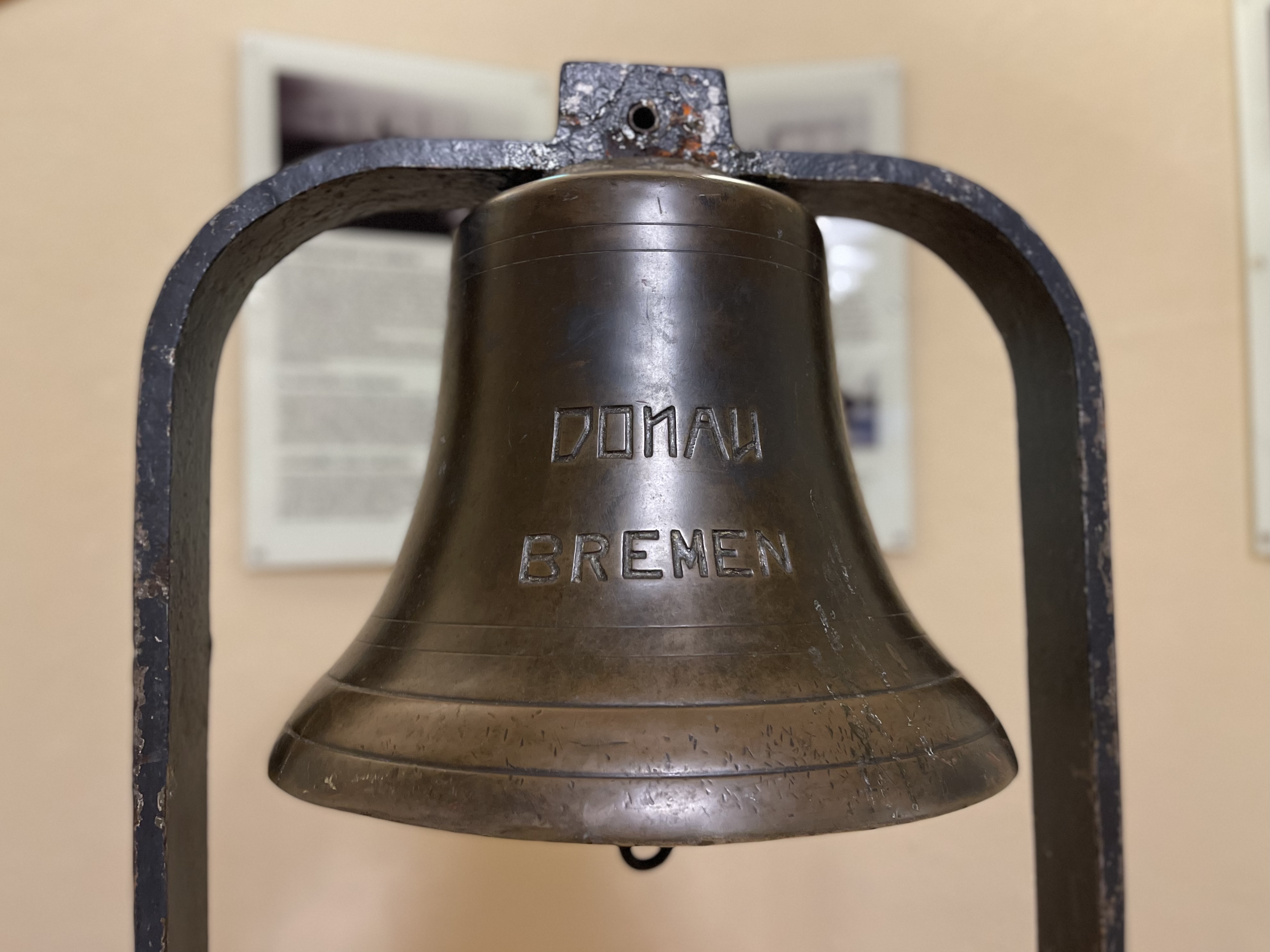
Donau's ship's bell, displayed at the Center for Studies of the Holocaust and Religious Minorities, Oslo, Norway

On 26 November 1942 Norwegian police, under Gestapo orders, handed 532 Jewish prisoners to the SS at Pier 1 in Oslo harbour. The ship was under the command of Untersturmführer Klaus Grossmann and Oberleutnant Manig. Men and women were put in separate holds on the ship, where they were deprived of basic sanitary conditions and mistreated by the soldiers. Only nine of the prisoners survived the Second World War.

On 19 December 1942 Donau ran aground in Oslofjord. On 24 October 1943 she left Turku in Finland for Oslo. In January 1944 she was again at the disposal of the head of maritime transport in occupied Norway. From 20 to 23 February she sailed from Oslo to Tallinn. That July she was in the Skagerrak, and in August and October she was in the Baltic.

In November 1944 Donau sailed in a convoy to Norway. Allied aircraft bombed the convoy in the Skagerrak on 26 and 27 November, but the convoy returned fire, and Donau and her sister ship Isar safely reached their destination in Langesund. They made their return voyage in the first week of December.

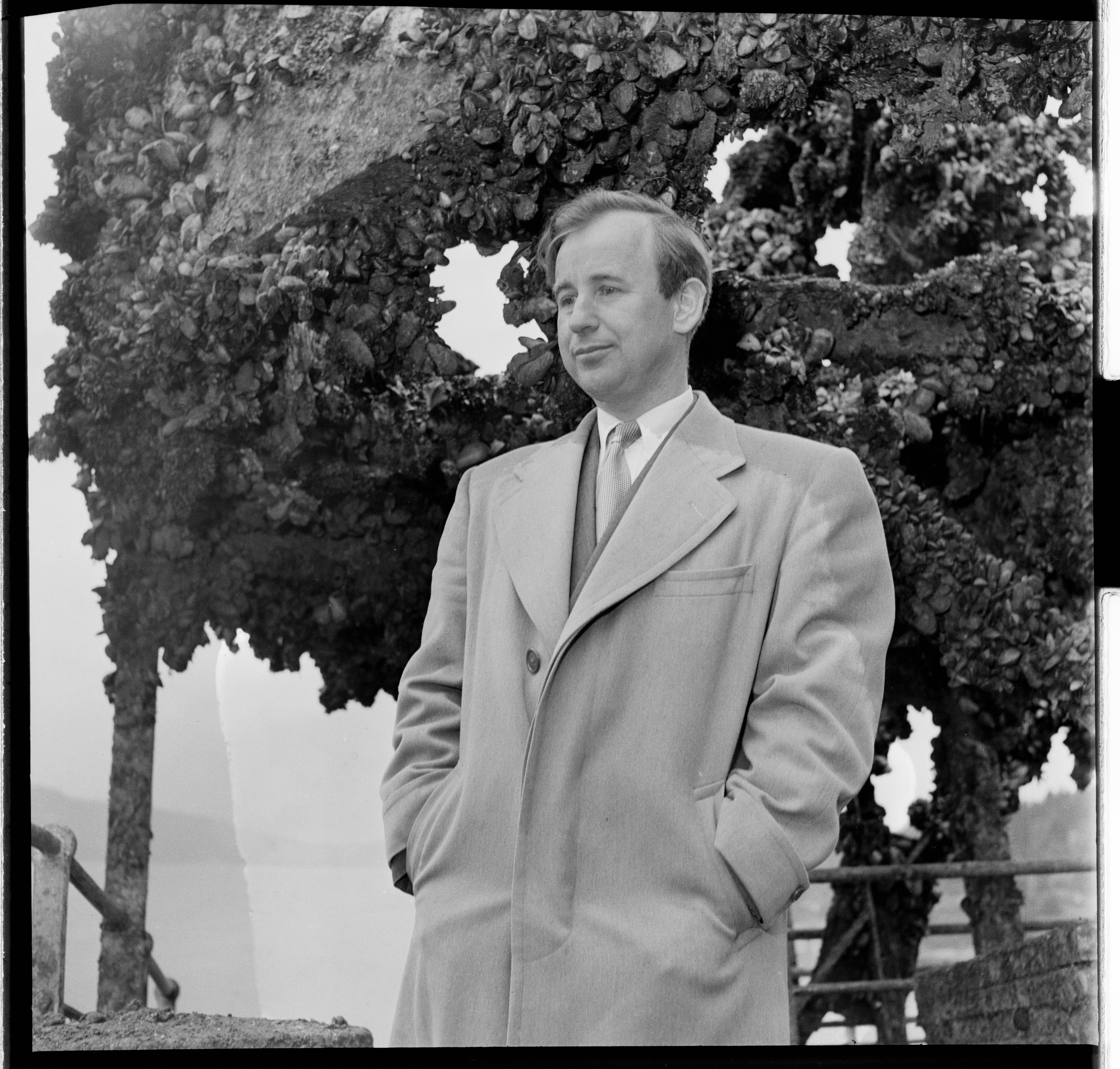
Max Manus, who with Roy Nielsen limpet mined Donau in 1945, visiting her wreck after it was raised in 1952

In January 1945 Donau shuttled between Aarhus in Denmark and Oslo in Norway. On or shortly before 16 January, Roy Nielsen of Milorg and Max Manus of Kompani Linge planted ten limpet mines 0.5 metres (1.6 ft) below the waterline along a 60-metre (200 ft) section of the port side of Donau's hull, while she was docked in Oslo. The mines were meant to detonate in open sea once the ship had left Oslofjord, but her departure on the morning of 17 January 1945 was delayed, so they detonated before she reached Drøbak, where the captain managed to beach her.

== Salvage and scrapping ==
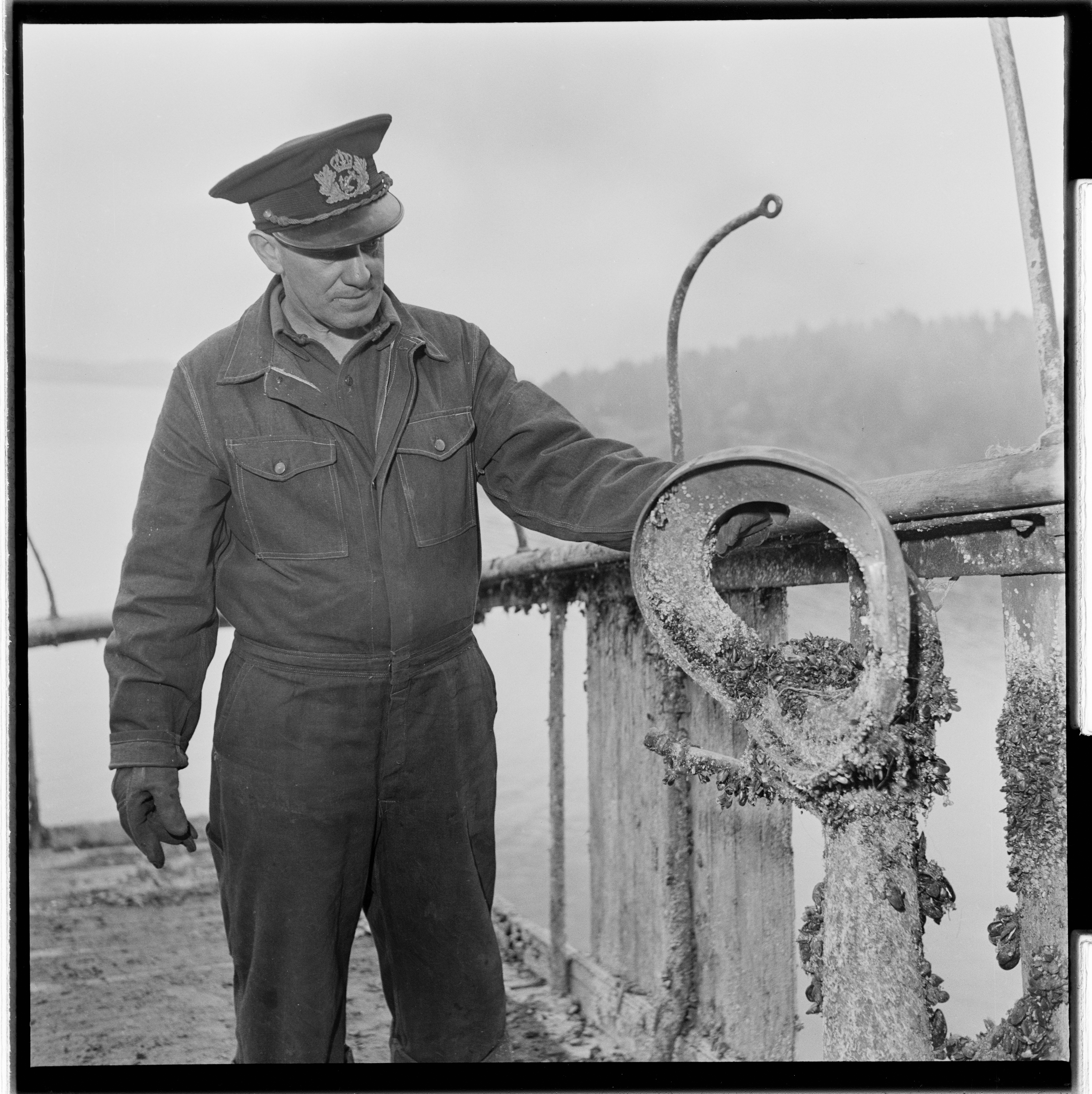
Captain Erling Erichsen, Donau's former commander, assessing the condition of the wreck after she was raised in 1952

In May 1945 ownership of the wreck passed to the Norwegian government. In October 1947 Rederi AS Henneseid of Porsgrunn acquired salvage rights to it. But Henneseid failed to raise the wreck, so in 1951 the rights reverted to the Norwegian government. In September 1951 Jansens Rederi AS of Bergen began salvage work. Jansens succeeded in raising the wreck on 19 April 1952. Akers Mekaniske Verksted was to repair the ship, but she was beyond economic repair. In August 1952 she was towed from Oslo to Bremerhaven, where Eisen & Metall KG Lehr & Co scrapped her.

== Feature film ==
The 2008 Norwegian film Max Manus: Man of War includes the mining of Donau. The Norwegian film Den største forbrytelsen depicts the deportation of the Norwegian Jews in October 1942.

== Bibliography ==
- Lloyd's Register of Shipping (PDF). Vol. II.–Steamers and Motorships of 300 tons gross and over. London: Lloyd's Register of Shipping. 1930 – via Southampton City Council.
- Lloyd's Register of Shipping (PDF). Vol. I.–Steamers and Motorships under 300 tons. Trawlers, tugs, dredgers, &c. Sailing vessels, shipowners, &c. London: Lloyd's Register of Shipping. 1930 – via Southampton City Council.
- Lloyd's Register of Shipping (PDF). Vol. II.–Steamers and Motorships of 300 tons gross and over. London: Lloyd's Register of Shipping. 1934 – via Southampton City Council.
- Lloyd's Register of Shipping (PDF). Vol. II.–Steamers and Motorships over 300 tons. London: Lloyd's Register of Shipping. 1937 – via Southampton City Council.
- Ottosen, Kristian (1994). "Overfarten". I slik en natt – historien om deportasjonen av jøder fra Norge (in Norwegian). Oslo: Aschehoug. pp. 67–72. ISBN 82-03-26049-7.
