= The Holocaust in Norway =

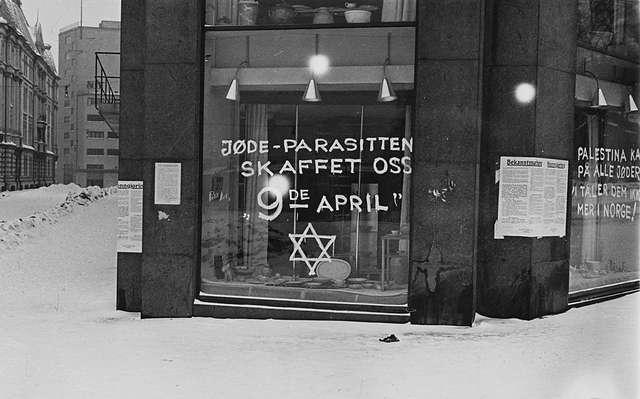
Antisemitic graffiti on shop windows in Oslo in 1941. (The location is at the junction of present-day Henrik Ibsen's Street and Crown Prince Street.) The address is called "Glitne-gården" by some.

The German occupation of Norway began on 9 April 1940. In 1942, there were at least 2,173 Jews in Norway. At least 775 of them were arrested, detained and/or deported. More than half of the Norwegians who died in camps in Germany were Jews. 742 Jews were murdered in the camps and 23 Jews died as a result of extrajudicial execution, murder and suicide during the war, bringing the total of Jewish Norwegian dead to at least 765, comprising 230 complete households.

Many Jews survived by fleeing Norway, nearly two-thirds escaping. Of these, around 900 Jews were smuggled out of the country by the Norwegian resistance movement, mostly to Sweden but some also to the United Kingdom. Between 28 and 34 of those deported survived their continued imprisonment in camps (following their deportation)—and around 25 (of these) returned to Norway after the war. About 800 Norwegian Jews who had fled to Sweden returned after the war.

== Background ==
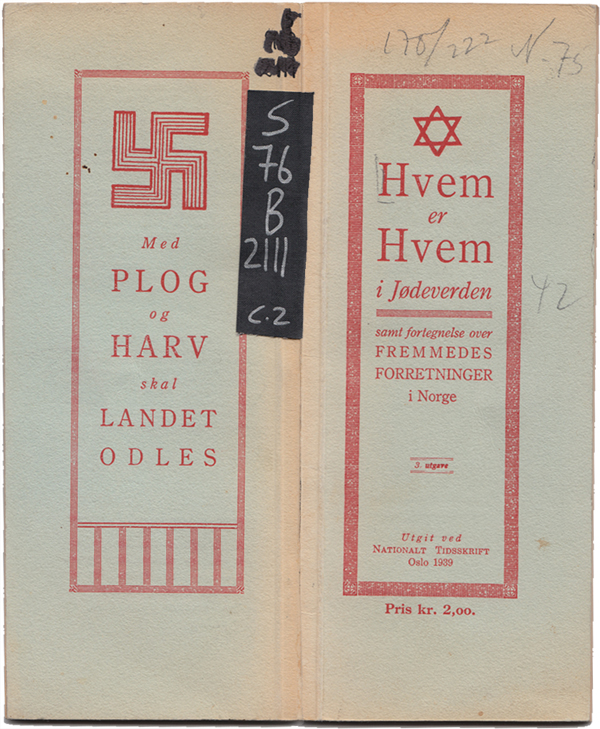
Who's Who in the Jewish World, an attache to an antisemitic periodical listing Jews and presumed Jews in Norway. First edition printed in 1925.

The Jewish population in Norway was very small until the early 20th century, when pogroms in Russia and the Baltic states saw Jews seeking refuge, including in Norway. Another surge came in the 1930s, when Jews fled Nazi persecution in Germany and areas under German control. Niels Christian Ditleff was a Norwegian diplomat who in the late 1930s was posted to Warsaw, Poland. In the spring of 1939, he set up a transit station in Warsaw for Jewish refugees from Czechoslovakia that had been sent there through the sponsorship of Nansenhjelpen. Ditleff arranged for the refugees to receive food, clothing, and transportation to Gdynia, Poland, where they boarded ships bound for Norway. Nansenhjelpen was a Norwegian humanitarian organization founded by Odd Nansen in 1936 to provide safe haven and assistance in Norway for Jewish refugees from areas in Europe under Nazi control. The sanctuary in Norway was only short-lived.

The German invasion and occupation of Norway began on 9 April 1940. Josef Terboven was made Reichskommissar for Norway on 24 April 1940, even before the invasion was completed on 7 June 1940. The legitimate Norwegian government left the country, and German occupying authorities under Terboven put Norwegian civilian authorities under his control. This included various branches of Norwegian police, including the district sheriffs (Lensmannsetaten), criminal police, and order police. Nazi police branches, including the SD and Gestapo, also became part of a network that served as tools for increasingly oppressive policies toward the Norwegian populace.

As a deliberate strategy, Terboven's regime sought to use Norwegian, rather than German, officials to subjugate the Norwegian population. Although German police and paramilitary forces reported through the Reich Security Main Office chain of command, and Norwegian police formally into the newly formed Department of Police, the actual practice was that Norwegian police officials took direction from the German RSHA.

Much of the prejudice against Jews commonly found in Europe was also evident in Norway in the late 19th and early 20th century, and Nasjonal Samling (NS), the Nazi party in Norway, made antisemitism part of its political platform in the 1930s. Halldis Neegaard Østbye became the de facto spokeswoman for increasingly virulent propaganda against Jews, summarized in her 1938 book Jødeproblemet og dets løsning (The Jewish Problem and its Solution). NS had also started gathering information about Norwegian Jews before the war started, and antisemitic op-ed articles were occasionally published in the mainstream press.

== Preparations ==
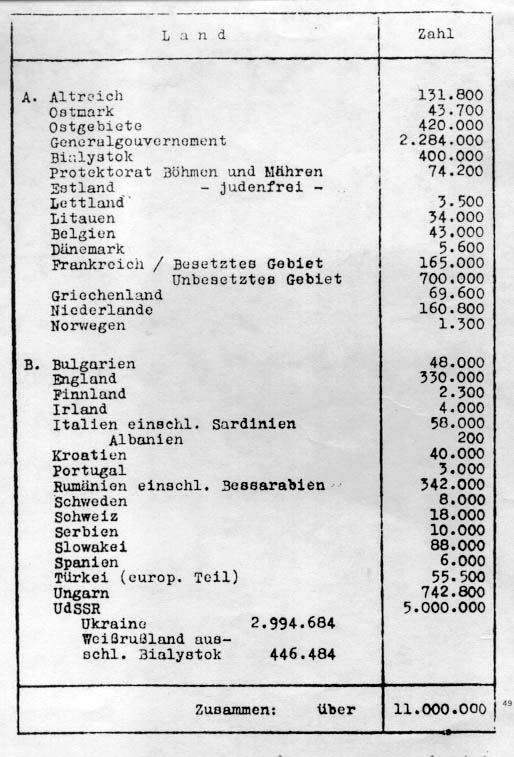
The estimate of numbers of Jews presented at the Wannsee Conference, which incorrectly estimated the number of Jews in Norway as 1,300.

The Nasjonal Samling (NS) was the Nazi party in Norway and started gathering information about Norwegian Jews before the war started. To identify Norwegian Jews, the authorities relied on information from the police and telegraph service, whilst the synagogues in Oslo and Trondheim were ordered to produce full rosters of their members, including their names, date of birth, profession, and address. Jewish burial societies and youth groups were likewise ordered to produce their lists.

In August, the synagogues were also ordered to produce lists of Jews who were not members. The resulting lists were cross-referenced with information Nasjonal Samling had compiled previously and information from the Norwegian Central Bureau of statistics. In the end, occupying authorities in Norway had a more complete list of Jews in Norway than most other countries under Nazi rule.

On the basis of the lists compiled in the spring, the Justice Department and county governors started in the fall to register all Jewish property, including commercial holdings. A complete inventory was transmitted to the police department in December 1941, and this also included individuals who were suspected of having a Jewish background.

Although several Norwegian Jews had already been arrested and deported as political prisoners in the early months of the occupation, the first measure targeting all Jews was an order from the German foreign ministry made through Terboven that on 10 May 1941 the police of Oslo were to confiscate radios from all Jews in the city. Within days local sheriffs throughout the entire country received the same orders.

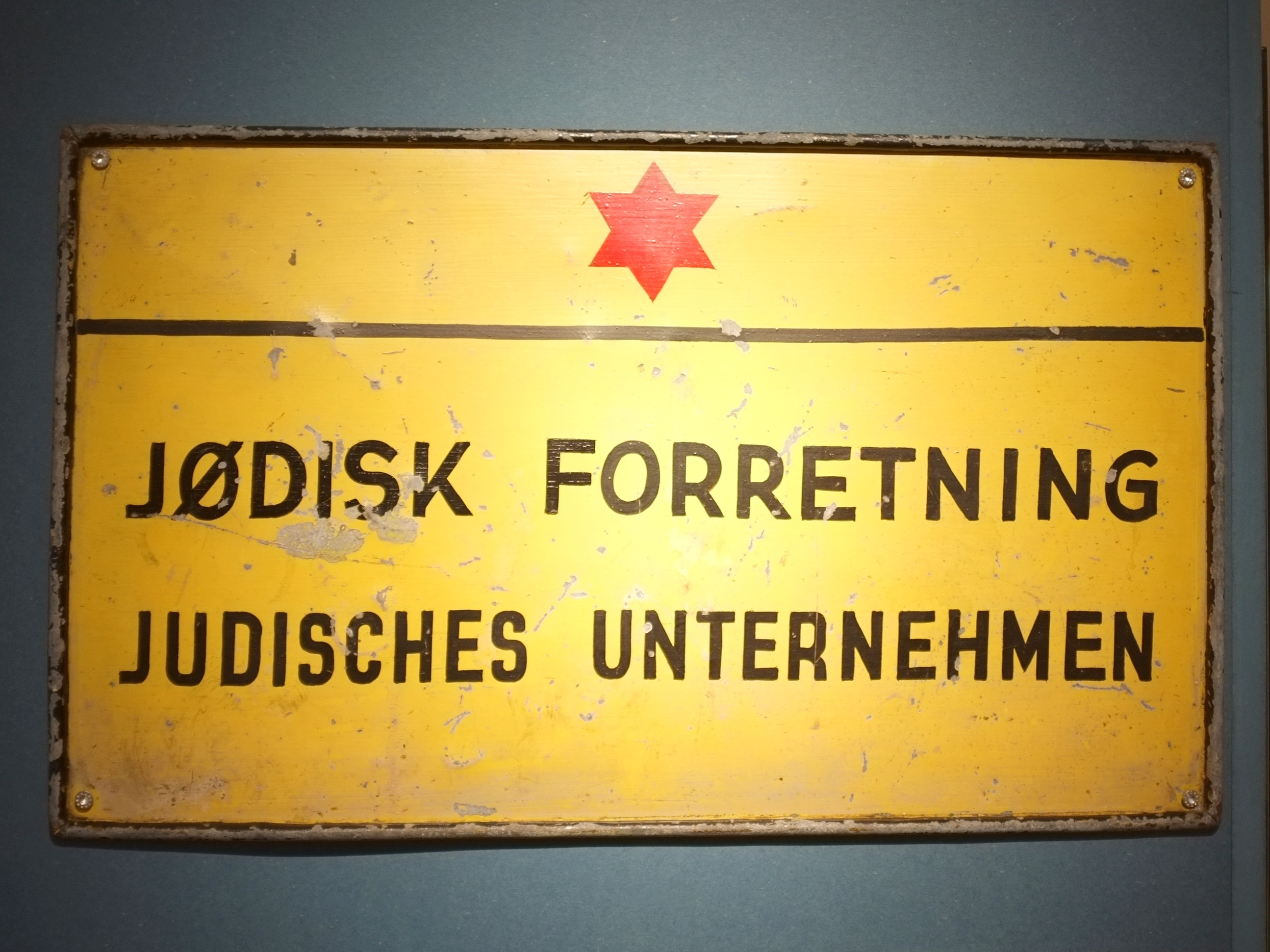
May 1940, only two months after the German occupation started, the German commander in Fredrikstad put up the sign with the warning "Jewish Shop" in Norwegian and German.

On 20 December 1941, the Norwegian Department of Police ordered 700 stamps with a 2 cm tall "J" for use by authorities to stamp the identification cards of Jews in Norway. These were put into use on 10 January 1942, when advertisements in the mainstream press ordered all Norwegian Jews to immediately present themselves at local police stations to have their identification papers stamped. They were also ordered to complete an extensive form. For purposes of this registration, a Jew was identified as anyone who had at least three "full-Jewish" grandparents; anyone who had two "full-Jewish" grandparents and was married to a Jew; or was a member of a Jewish congregation. This registration showed that about 1,400 Jewish adults lived in Norway.

The Norwegian State Railways "aided without protest in the deportation", according to author Halvor Hegtun.

In 1942, there were 2,173 Jews in Norway. Of these, it is estimated that 1,643 were Norwegian citizens, 240 were foreign citizens, and 290 were stateless.

An article on the University of Texas at Austin, College of Liberal Arts website states that Vidkun Quisling planned "to eradicate the Norwegian Sami because he considered them inferior to the Norwegian race".

== Arrests and confiscation ==
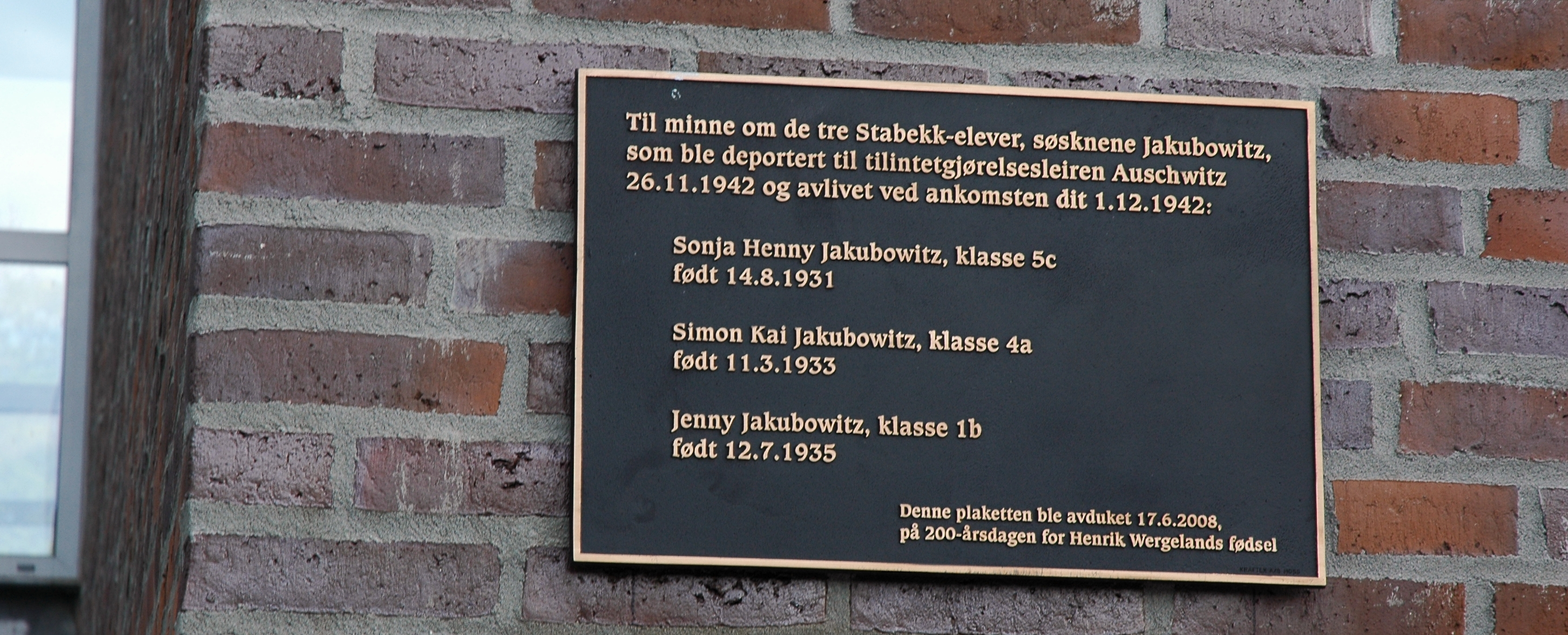
Memorial plaque at Stabekk elementary school over three children who were taken out of their classrooms and sent to Auschwitz

Both German and Norwegian police officials intensified efforts to target the Jewish population during 1941 and the Falstad concentration camp was established near Levanger, north of Trondheim. Jews who were arrested automatically lost their citizenship. Jewish individuals, particularly those who were stateless, were briefly detained in connection with Operation Barbarossa. The first Jewish Norwegian to be deported was Benjamin Bild, a labor union activist and mechanic accused of sabotage, who died in Gross Rosen. Moritz Rabinowitz, was probably the first to be arrested in March 1941 for agitating against Nazi antisemitism in the Haugesund press. He was sent to Sachsenhausen concentration camp where he was beaten to death on 27 December 1942.

German troops occupied and vandalized the Trondheim Synagogue on 21 April 1941. The Torah scrolls had been secured in the early days of the war, and before long the Methodist church in Trondheim had provided temporary facilities for Jewish religious services. Several Jewish residents of Trondheim were arrested and detained at Falstad. The first such prisoner was Efraim Koritzinsky, a medical doctor and head of Trondheim hospital. Several others followed; altogether eight of these were shot in the woods outside the camp that became the infamous site of extrajudicial executions in Norway On 24 February 1942, all remaining Jewish property in Trondheim was seized by Nazi authorities.

=== After the establishment of first concentration camp ===
On 18 June 1941, 13 male Jews (they were considered old enough for working [as laborers]) were arrested in Tromsø and Narvik and thereafter imprisoned at Sydspissen (the first concentration camp in Norway).

By the fall of 1942, about 150 Jews had fled Norway. The Jewish population in Norway had experienced some mistreatment specifically targeted at them, but the prevailing sense was that their lot was the same as all other Norwegians.

As the brutality of the Terboven regime came to light through the atrocities at Telavåg, martial law in Trondheim in 1942, etc., persecution against Jews in particular became more pronounced.

After numerous cases of harassment and violence against individuals, orders were issued to Norwegian police authorities on 24 and 25 October 1942, to arrest all Jewish men over the age of 15 and confiscate all their property. On 26 October, several Norwegian police branches and 20 soldiers of Germanic-SS rounded up and arrested Jewish men, often leaving their wives and children on the street. These prisoners were held primarily at Berg concentration camp in Southern Norway and Falstad concentration camp in central parts of the country; some were held in local jails, while Jewish women were ordered to report in person to their local sheriffs every day.

On the morning of 26 November, German soldiers and more than 300 Norwegian officials (belonging to Statspolitiet, Kriminalpolitiet, Hirden and Germanske SS-Norge) were deployed to arrest and detain Jewish women and children. These were sent by cars and train to the pier in Oslo where a cargo ship, the SS Donau was waiting to transport them to Stettin, and from there to Auschwitz.

By 27 November, all Jews in Norway (except one) were either deported and murdered, imprisoned, had fled to Sweden, or were in hiding in Norway.

Around 70 Jews remained imprisoned at Berg concentration camp until the end of the war, because they were married to "Aryans".

== Deportation and mass murder ==
- The first group deportation of Jews from Norway was on 19 November 1942 when the ship Monte Rosa left Oslo with 21 Jewish deportees out of a total of 223 deportees (or prisoners) onboard.
- The original plan was to ship all remaining Jews in Norway in one cargo ship, the SS Donau, on 26 November 1942, but only 532 prisoners boarded the SS Donau that day; on the same day, the MS Monte Rosa carried 26 Jews from Oslo. The Donau landed in Stettin on 30 November. The prisoners boarded cargo trains at Breslauer Bahnhof, 60 to a car and departed Stettin at 5:12 pm. The train journey to Auschwitz took 28 hours. All the prisoners arrived alive at the camp, and there they were sorted into two lines. 186 were sent to slave labor in the Birkenau subcamp, the rest - 345 - were killed (within hours) in Auschwitz's gas chambers.
- The remaining Jewish prisoners that had been en route to Oslo on 26 November for the departure of the Donau were delayed, possibly as a result of delaying tactics by the Red Cross and sympathetic railroad workers. These were imprisoned under harsh conditions at Bredtveit concentration camp in Oslo to await a later transport.
- On 24 February 1943, the Bredtveit prisoners, along with 25 from Grini, boarded the Gotenland in Oslo, altogether 158. The ship departed the following day, also landing in Stettin, where they arrived on 27 February. They traveled to Auschwitz via Berlin, where they stayed overnight at the Levetzowstrasse Synagogue. They arrived at Auschwitz on the night between 2 March and 3 March. Of the 158 who arrived from Norway, only 26 or 28 survived the first day, being sent to the Monowitz subcamp of Auschwitz.

There were smaller and individual deportations after the Gotenland's voyage. A smaller number of Jewish prisoners remained in camps in Norway during the war, primarily those who were married to non-Jewish Norwegians. These were subject to mistreatment and neglect. In the camp in Grini, for example, the group that was harshest treated consisted of violent criminals and Jews.

Altogether, about 767 Jews from Norway were deported and sent to German concentration camps, primarily Auschwitz. 26 of these survived the ordeal. In addition to the 741 murdered in the camps, 23 died as a result of extrajudicial execution, murder, and suicide during the war; bringing the total of Jewish Norwegian dead to at least 764, comprising 230 complete households. Out of those killed, 346 of them were murdered on 1 December 1942, making this the day with the highest death toll.

=== People who (in advance) were privy to specifics of the rounding-up and deportation of Jews ===
Karl Marthinsen, chief of Statspolitiet (STAPO) wrote in a 17 November 1942 memo, that time had been too short for [adequate preparations on his part], and that he should have had as many weeks for preparations, as there were days [left until deportation of Jews]. In contrast, Gunnar Sønsteby claimed [once, in 1970] that Sønsteby had three months advance knowledge about the deportations from Norway; doubts about his claim include the views of historians such as Tore Pryser saying that "In my view, Sønsteby was bluffing. He was trying to give the impression that he knew more than he did. Sønsteby was treated as an oracle, not in the least by the press [corps]".

== Escape to Sweden ==
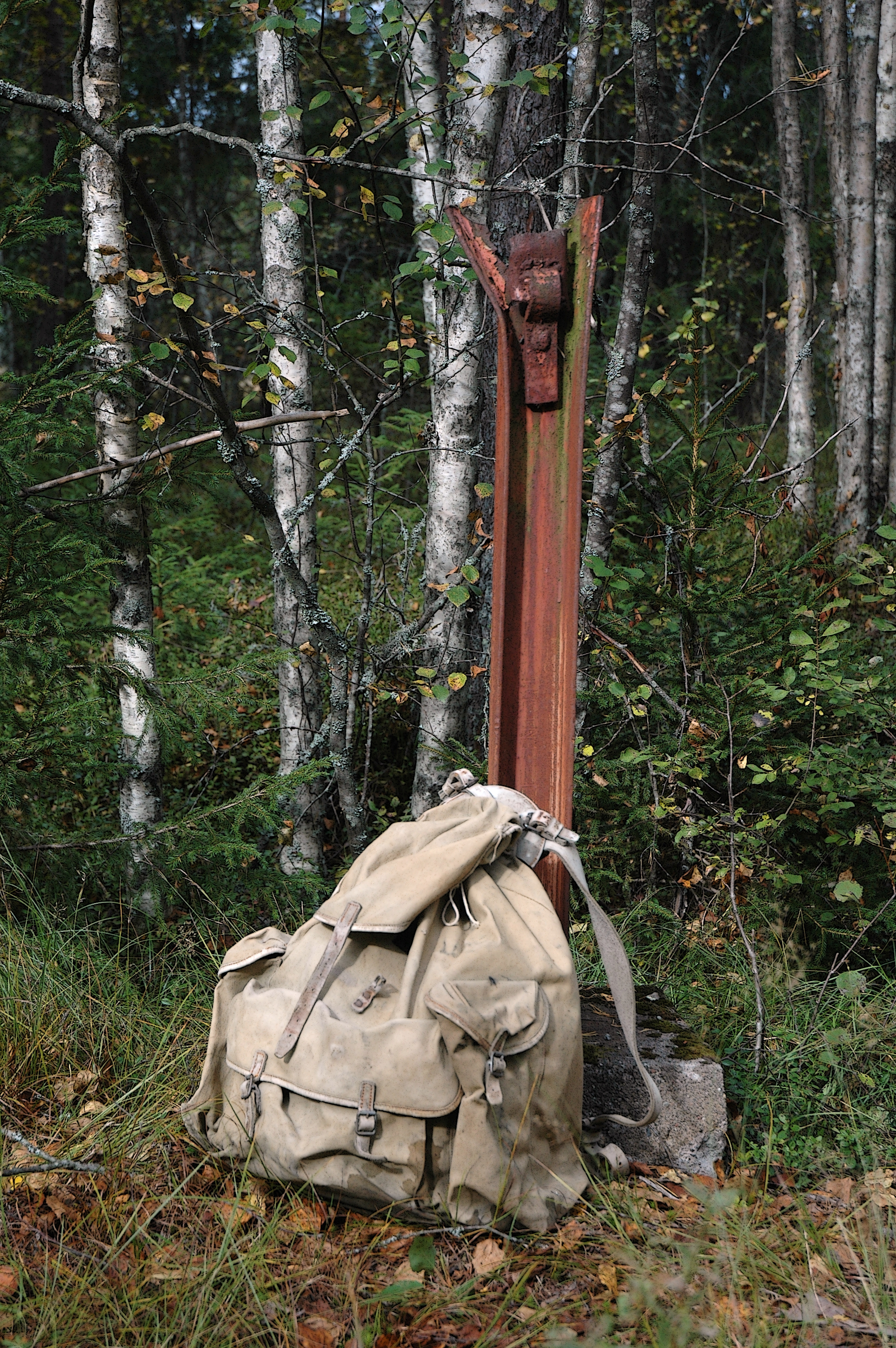
Backpack used by Jewish refugees, placed at remnants of gate at a border crossing to Sweden

Early during the occupation, there was traffic between neutral countries, primarily Sweden over land; and the United Kingdom, by sea. Even as the occupying authorities tried to limit such traffic, the underground railroad became more organized. Swedish authorities were at first only willing to accept political refugees and did not count Jews among them. Several Jewish refugees were turned away at the border, and a few were subsequently deported.

The North Sea route would become increasingly challenging as German forces increased their naval presence along the Norwegian coast, limiting the sea route to special operations missions against German military targets. The land routes to Sweden became the main conduit for people and materials that either needed to get out of Norway for their safety, or into Norway for clandestine missions.

There were a few private routes across the border, but most were organized through three resistance groups: Milorg ("military organization"), Sivorg ("civilian organization") and Komorg, the communist resistance group. These routes were carefully guarded, in large part through a network of secret cells. Some efforts to infiltrate them, especially through the Rinnan gang (Sonderabteilung Lola) succeeded, but such holes were quickly plugged.

Price gouging or extortion of refugees, was focused on in Marte Michelet's 2018 book; the existence of those phenomena is hardly controversial, according to Ervin Kohn and Rolf Golombek (leaders of the largest Jewish congregation in Oslo).

=== Recommendations for (or warnings to) escape ===
Examples of Jews being recommended to escape include outgoing communication by anti-Nazi Germans in Norway: Theodor Steltzer warned Wolfgang Geldmacher—married to Randi Eckhoff, sister of member of the Resistance "Rolf Eckhoff. From them, warnings were passed on to Lise Børsum, Amalie Christie, Robert Riefling, Ole Jacob Malm and others".

As of the 2020s, there is debate between scientists in regard to what should be "counted as warnings" in advance of the deportion of Jews [from Norway, and in relation to deportations from other countries].

==== Report of disappearance—filed in Norway—regarding two Jews on the first transport from Prague to Poland ====
On 16 December 1941, "secretary of Nansen International Office for Refugees received a letter from the stateless Jews Nora Lustig, Fritz Lusting and Leo Eitinger. They were in Norway, and wrote that Czech Jews that they knew, had been deported to an unknown place in Poland. They asked Filseth, to report missing (through Red Cross), two Jews, shipped with the first transport from Prague to Poland".

=== After the arrest of Jewish men (on 26 October 1942) ===
The arrest and detention of Jewish men on 26 October 1942 changed that premise, but at that point many were afraid of reprisals against the imprisoned men if they left. Some Norwegian Nazis and German officials advised Jews to leave the country as quickly as possible.

On the evening of 25 November, resistance people got a few hours' notice before the scheduled arrests and deportation of all Jews in Norway. Many did their best to notify the remaining Jews who were not already detained, usually by making brief phone calls or short appearances on people's doorsteps. This was more successful in Oslo than other areas. Those who were warned only had a few hours to go into hiding and days to find their way out of the country.

The Norwegian resistance movement had not planned for the contingency that hundreds of individuals had to go underground in one night, and it was left to individuals to improvise shelter out of sight of the arresting authorities. Many were moved several times in just as many days.

Most of the refugees were moved in small groups across the border, typically with the help of taxis or trucks, railroads to areas near the border, and then by foot, car, bicycle, or on skis across the border. It was a particularly cold winter, and the crossing involved considerable hardship and uncertainty. Those who had the means, paid their non-Jewish helpers for their trouble.

The passage was complicated by the vigilance of police who were committed to capturing such refugees, and Terboven imposed the death penalty for anyone caught aiding Jewish refugees. Only individuals who by application were granted "border zone permits" were allowed within easy traveling distance to the border with Sweden. Trains were subject to regular search and inspection, and there were continuous patrols of the area. A failed crossing would have dire consequences for anyone caught, as indeed it turned out for a few.

Still, at least 900 Jewish refugees made their way across the border to Sweden. They usually went through a transit center in Kjesäter in Vingåker Municipality, and then found temporary homes throughout Sweden, but mostly in certain towns where Norwegians gathered, such as Uppsala.

=== Criticism of the Norwegian government in exile, and of Milorg ===
Some have said that the Norwegian government in exile should have warned the Jews (and told them to flee), since Trygve Lie already in June 1942 knew about what was happening to Jews in continental Europe, while others say that "What could one expect from Lie while the British and the Americans did not believe the messages from Poland? Also in Norway there had been difficulty in believing that gruesomeness had taken place".

Some have said that Milorg did too little for the Jews, while others say that "The great rescue operation Carl Fredriksens Transport was a result of orders from a tilbaketrukket leader of Milorg, Ole Berg, and later financed by Sivorg".

In 2014 Jahn Otto Johansen said that "the Norwegian Cabinet [in exile] in London, and Milorg's leadership, as well as large parts of Norwegian society, did not particularly care about the Jews. There is agreement about this among seriøse historians. - I can refer to [the book by] Samuel Abrahamsen Norway's response to the Holocaust. I cooperated closely with" him "and discovered how many worked against his project because the [Norwegian] Cabinet [in] London's-, Milorg's- and Norwegian society's alleged positive attitude towards the Jews, was not to be doubted". There was antisemitism in Resistance groups [in Norway], according to the 2020 book by Elise Barring Berggren [a history student] and historians Bjarte Bruland and Mats Tangestuen.

== Criminal culpability and moral responsibility ==
=== Criminal prosecution ===
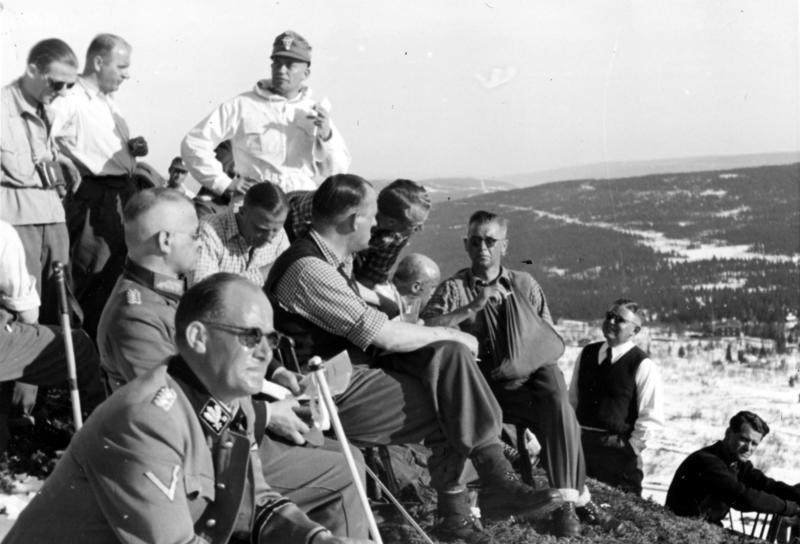
Terboven, Rediess, and other SS officers on an excursion to Skeikampen in April, 1942

Although both the Norwegian Nazi party Nasjonal Samling and the German Nazi establishment had a political platform that called for persecution and ultimately the genocide of European Jewry, the arrest and deportation of Jews in Norway into the hands of the camp officials turned on the actions of several specific individuals and groups.

The ongoing rivalry between Reichskommissar Josef Terboven and Ministerpresident Vidkun Quisling may have played a role, as both were likely presented with the directives from the Wannsee Conference in January 1942. The German policy was to use Norwegian police as a front for the Norwegian implementation of the conference plans, orders for which were issued along two chains of command: from Adolf Eichmann through the RSHA and Heinrich Fehlis to Hellmuth Reinhard, the Gestapo chief in Norway; and from Quisling through the "minister of justice" Sverre Riisnæs and "minister of police" Jonas Lie through to Karl Marthinsen, the head of the Norwegian state police.

Documentation from the period suggests that the Nazi authorities, and especially the Quisling administration, were loath to initiate actions that might cause widespread opposition among the Norwegian population. Quisling had tried and failed to take over the teachers' unions, the clergy of the State of Norway, athletics, and the arts. Eichmann had deprioritized the extermination of Jews in Norway, as the number was low and even Nasjonal Samling had claimed that the "Jewish problem" in Norway was minor. Confiscation of Jewish property, the arrest of Jewish men, constant harassment and individual murder was – until late November, 1942 – part of Terboven's approach of terrorizing the Norwegian population into submission.

The evidence suggests that Hellmuth Reinhard took the initiative to put an end to all Jews in Norway. This may have been motivated by his own ambition, and it's possible he was encouraged by the lack of outrage over the initial measures targeting Jews.

According to the trial against him in Baden-Baden in 1964, Reinhard arranged for the SS Donau to set aside capacity for prisoner transport on 26 November and ordered Karl Marthinsen to mobilize the necessary Norwegian forces to effect the transit from Norway. In a curious sidenote to all this, he also sent along a typewriter on the Donau to properly register all prisoners, and was insistent that it be returned to him on Donau's return voyage – which it was.

A local, Norwegian, police chief in Oslo named Knut Rød provided on-the-ground command of Norwegian police officers for arresting women and children and transporting them as well as the men who had already been detained to the Oslo harbor and putting them in the hands of the German SS troops.

Eichmann was not notified of the transport until the Donau had left the harbor, bound for Stettin. Nevertheless, he was able to arrange for box cars to be present for transport to Auschwitz.

Of those involved:

- Terboven committed suicide before being captured when the war ended; Quisling was convicted for treason and executed. Jonas Lie died, apparently of a heart attack before his capture. Sverre Riisnæs either feigned insanity or went insane and was put in protective custody. Marthinsen was assassinated by the Norwegian resistance in February 1945. Heinrich Fehlis committed suicide by first taking poison and then shooting himself in May 1945.

In the end, only two of the principals were put on trial:

- Hellmuth Reinhard left Norway in January 1945 without any clues to his whereabouts. He was presumed dead and his wife was issued a death certificate so she could remarry. But it turned out he had changed his name to his birth name of Hellmuth Patzschke and had actually remarried his "widow," settling down as a publisher in Baden-Baden. His real identity was discovered in 1964, and he was put on trial. In spite of overwhelming evidence about his culpability for the deportation of Jews from Norway and his complicity in their deaths, he was acquitted because statute of limitations had expired. He was convicted and sentenced to five years for his participation in Operation Blumenpflücken.
- Knut Rød was put on trial in 1948, acquitted of all charges, and managed to get reinstated as a police officer and retired in 1965. Rød's acquittal remains controversial this day and has been characterized as "the strangest criminal trial [in the legal proceedings after World War II]".
- Another controversial trial was that held against members of the resistance Peder Pedersen and Håkon Løvestad, who confessed to killing an elderly Jewish couple and stealing their money. The jury found that the killing was justified, but convicted the two of embezzlement. This also became a controversial issue known as the Feldmann case.

The moral culpability among Norwegian police officers and Norwegian informants is a matter of continuing research and debate.

Although the persecution and murder of Jews was raised as a factor in several trials, including that against Quisling, legal scholars agree that in no case was it a decisive or even weighty factor in the conviction or sentencing of these people.

=== Moral responsibility ===
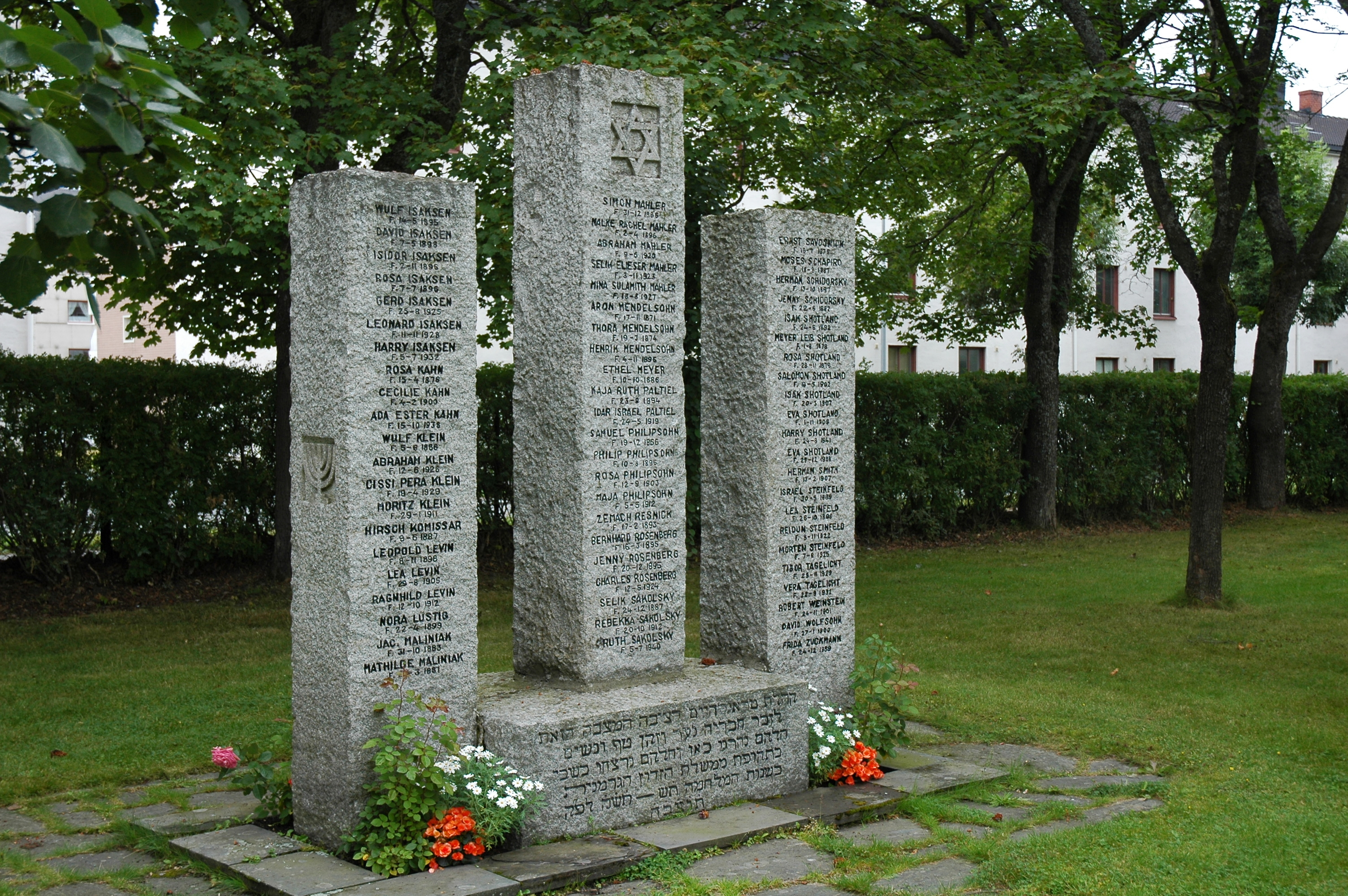
Holocaust memorial at the Jewish cemetery at Lademoen in Trondheim, Norway

Beyond the criminal actions of individuals in Norway that led to the deportation and murder of Jews from Norway, and indeed also of non-Jews who were persecuted on political, religious or other pretexts, there has been considerable public debate in Norway about the public morals that allowed these crimes to take place and did not prevent them from happening.

==== Comparison between Denmark and Norway ====
The situation of the Jews in Denmark was very different from Norway. Far fewer Danish Jews were arrested and deported, and those who were deported were sent to Theresienstadt, rather than Auschwitz, where a relatively large percentage survived.

Several factors have been cited for these differences:

- In Denmark, the German diplomat Georg Ferdinand Duckwitz leaked the plans for arrest and deportation to Hans Hedtoft several days before the plan was to be put in motion.
- The terms of occupation in Denmark gave Danish politicians greater influence over internal affairs in Denmark, and in particular command authority over Danish police forces. Consequently, German occupying authorities had to rely on German police and military to perform arrests. Where Danish police participated, it was to rescue Jews from Germans. Since the Norwegians resisted the Germans more actively, the country never enjoyed the same civil autonomy as did the Danes during the occupation.
- Danish popular opinion was more actively opposed to the Nazi occupation and was more emboldened to take care of its Jewish citizens. Non-Jewish Danes were known to take to the streets to find Jews who needed shelter, and to search the forests for Jews who had hidden there to help them.
- The arrest of Norwegian Jews happened about one year before the arrests in Denmark, and also before the Soviet victory at Stalingrad, which changed nearby Sweden's stand from being supportive of the Germans to lean towards the Allies. As there was considerable contact between the resistance in Denmark and Norway through neutral Sweden it means that the Danes knew what fate the Danish Jews were destined for. That Sweden had changed to lean towards the Allies also meant that it was open for Jewish refugees, which had not been the case before and early in the war.

==== Issues of moral responsibility ====
The exiled Norwegian government became part of the Allies upon the invasion on 9 April 1940. Though the most significant contribution of the Allied war effort was through the merchant marine fleet known as Nortraship, a number of Norwegian military forces were established and became part of the Norwegian Armed Forces in exile. Consequently, the Norwegian government was regularly briefed on Allied intelligence relating to atrocities committed by German forces in Eastern Europe and in occupied Netherlands, France, etc.

In addition, the Norwegian government also received regular intelligence from the Norwegian home front, including accounts from returning Norwegian Germanic-SS soldiers, who had firsthand accounts of massacres of Jews in Poland, Ukraine, etc.

Indeed, both underground resistance newspapers in Norway and the Norwegian press abroad published news about "wholesale murders" of Jews in the late summer and fall of 1942. There is, however, little evidence that either the Norwegian home front or Norwegian government expected that the Jews in Norway would be a target for the genocide that was unfolding on the European continent. On 1 December 1942, the Norwegian foreign minister, Trygve Lie sent a letter to the British section of the World Jewish Congress where he asserted that:

...it has never been found necessary for the Norwegian Government to appeal to the people of Norway to assist and to protect other individuals of classes in Norway, who have been selected for persecution by the German aggressors, and I feel convinced that such an appeal is not needed in order to urge the population to fulfill their human duty towards the Jews of Norway.

— Abrahamsen 1991, p. 10.

Although the Norwegian resistance by the fall of 1942 had a sophisticated network for transmitting and propagating urgent news among the population that led to very effective passive resistance efforts, e.g., in keeping the teachers' union, athletics, physicians, etc., out of Nazi control, no such notifications were issued to save Jews. Resistance groups including Milorg, however, were partially being unraveled in 1942, and executions of their own members, are some of the events that seemingly eclipsed the subject regarding the signals about an upcoming rounding-up of Jews.

The Protestant religious establishment in Norway did, however, make their opposition known: in a letter to Vidkun Quisling dated 10 November 1942, read out in Norwegian churches on two consecutive Sundays, bishops of the Church of Norway, the administration of the theological seminaries, the leaders of several leading religious organizations, and the leaders of non-Lutheran Protestant organizations protesting actions against the Jews, calling on Quisling "in the name of Jesus Christ" to "stop the persecution of Jews and stop the bigotry that through the press is disseminated throughout our land."

The discrimination, persecution, and ultimately deportation of Jews was enabled by the cooperation of Norwegian agencies that were not entirely co-opted by Nasjonal Samling or the German occupying powers. In addition to the police and local sheriffs who implemented the directives of Statspolitiet, the taxis aided in transporting Jewish prisoners to their point of deportation and even sued the Norwegian government after the war for wages owed to them for such services.

Jews in Norway had been singled out for persecution also before 26 October 1942. They were the first to have radios confiscated, were forced to register and have identification papers imprinted, and were banned from certain professions. However, it was not widely considered that this would extend to deportation and murder. It wasn't until the night of 26 November that the resistance movement was mobilized to rescue Jews from deportation. It took time for the network to be fully engaged, and until then Jewish refugees had to improvise on their own, and rely on acquaintances to avoid capture. Within a few weeks, however, the Norwegian home front organizations (including Milorg and Sivorg) had developed the means to move relatively large numbers of refugees out of Norway and also financed these escapes when needed.

== The State Railways' role ==
Bjørn Westlie says that the "Norwegian State Railways transported Jews to the outward shipping from the Oslo harbor (...) the NSB employees did not know what fate awaited the Jews. Naturally they understood that the Jews would be shipped out of the country by force, because the train went to Oslo harbor". Furthermore, Westlie points to "dilemmas [that] NSB's employees found themselves in when the NSB leadership cooperated with the Germans".

Later Westlie said about the extermination of Norwegian Jews: "what else than co-responsible was NSB ? For me, NSB's use of POWs and this deportation of Jews must be viewed as one: namely, that NSB thereby became an agency that participated in Hitler's violence against these two groups, who were the nazism's main enemies. The fact that the pertinent NSB leaders received awards after the war, confirms NSB's and others' desire to conceal this".

There was no investigation of the agencies [or NSB] after the war. However, the former chief Vik was not to be prosecuted if he "did not again work for NSB".

== Reactions ==
=== Prior to deportations ===
[At least one Norwegian] sogneprest (roughly equivalent of parish priest) who was a Resistance member, did not avoid praying for Jews [during sermons ], according to a report made to the Nazi occupation government, by a member of NS; the priest was arrested by Gestapo in April 1942, sent to Grini concentration camp, removed from his job, and banned from spending time in Oppland County.

In November (prior to the start of deportations), the temporary leadership of the Church of Norway, issued a letter of protest: Hebreer-brevet.

=== After deportations had started ===
The wartime Swedish government [faced, or] "turns toward" the foreign ministry of Nazi-Germany, after the Germans were sending the Norwegian Jews, straight to their deaths in Poland.

=== Post-war reactions ===
==== The post-war Norwegian government's refusal to finance the return of deported Jewish Norwegians ====
"When the White Buses travelled down [southward from Scandinavia] to fetch prisoners who had survived, Jews were not permitted on board because they were no longer considered Norwegian citizens, and the government after 8 May [1945] refused to finance their transportation home.", according to historian Kjersti Dybvig.

==== Announcement—from 5 survivors—on 30 May 1945 ====
A 30 May 1945 announcement in Dagbladet, signed by 5 Jewish survivors of [ Auschwitz concentration camp, followed by their "death march" to] Buchenwald concentration camp, thanked the Norwegian students that also were imprisoned at the concentration camp: "[...] We can without exaggeration say that these real comrades, risking their own lives, have helped us so that we today again can stand as free persons in Norway".

==== Reaction to the (war-time) confiscation of Jewish assets ====
===== Restitution =====
On 27 May 1995, Bjørn Westlie published an article in the daily, Dagens Næringsliv, that highlighted the uncompensated financial loss incurred by the Norwegian Jewish community as a result of Nazi persecution during the war. This brought to public attention the fact that much if not most of the assets confiscated from Jewish owners during the war had been inadequately restored to them and their descendants, even in cases where the Norwegian government or private individuals had benefited from the confiscation after the war.

====== Skarpnes commission ======
In response to this debate, the Norwegian Ministry of Justice on 29 March 1996, named a commission to investigate what was done with Jewish assets during the war. The commission consisted of County governor of Vest Agder, Oluf Skarpnes as its chair, professor of law Thor Falkanger, professor of history Ole Kristian Grimnes, district court judge Guri Sunde, director at National Archival Services of Norway, psychologist Berit Reisel, and cand.philol. Bjarte Bruland, Bergen. Consultant Torfinn Vollan from the Skarpnes's office acted as the commission's secretary. Of the commission's members, Dr. Reisel and Mr. Bruland had been nominated by the Jewish community in Norway. Anne Hals resigned from the commission early in the process, and Eli Fure from the same institution was named in her place.

The commission worked together for a year, but it became apparent that there were diverging views on premises for the group's analysis, and on 23 June 1997 it delivered a divided report to the Ministry of Justice:

- The majority focused its effort on arriving at an accurate accounting of the assets lost during the war using conventional assumptions and information in available records. It uncovered losses was estimated to be 108 million Norwegian krone (kr), based on the value of the krone in May 1997 (≈US$15 million).
- The minority, consisting of Reisel and Bruland, sought a more in-depth understanding of the historical sequence of events around the loss of individual assets, as well as both the intended and actual effect of the confiscation and subsequent events, whether the owners were deported, killed, or escaped. It uncovered losses was estimated to be 330 million kr.

After considerable debate in the media, the government accepted the findings of the minority report and initiated financial compensation and issuing a public apology.

====== Government proposal ======
On 15 May 1998, the Prime Minister of Norway, Kjell Magne Bondevik, proposed compensation of 450 million kr, covering both a 'collective' and an 'individual' restitution. On 11 March 1999, the Stortinget voted to accept the proposition for 450 million kr. The collective part, totaling 250 million kr, was divided into three:

- Funds to sustain the Jewish community in Norway (150 million kr).
- Support for development, outside Norway, of the traditions and culture which the Nazis wished to exterminate, to be distributed by a foundation where the executive committee members are to be appointed one each by the Norwegian Government, the Norwegian Parliament, the Jewish community in Norway, and the World Jewish Congress/World Jewish Restitution Organization. Eli Wiesel was suggested to lead the executive committee (60 million kr).
- The formation of a national museum for tolerance, established as the Norwegian Center for Studies of Holocaust and Religious Minorities (40 million kr).

The individual part was estimated to total not more than 200 million kr, as compensation to individuals and their survivors, with a maximum of 200,000 kr each. By 31 November 1999, the last date for individuals to apply for compensation, 980 people had received 200,000 kr (≈US$26,000) each, totaling 196 million kr (≈US$25 million).

====== Assessment of financial loss ======
The Nazi authorities confiscated all Jewish property with an administrative penstroke. This included commercial property such as retail stores, factories, workshops, etc.; and also personal property such as residences, bank accounts, automobiles, securities, furniture, and other fixtures they could find. Jewelry and other personal valuables were usually taken by German officials as "voluntary contributions to the German war effort." In addition, Jewish professionals were typically deprived of any legal right to practice their profession: attorneys were disbarred, physicians and dentists lost their licenses, and craftsmen were locked out of their trade associations. Employers were pressured to fire all Jewish employees. In many cases, Jewish proprietors were forced to continue to work at their confiscated businesses for the benefit of the "new owners."

Assets were often sold at fire sale prices or assigned at a token price to Nazis, Germans, or their sympathizers.

The administration of these assets was performed by a "Liquidation board for confiscated Jewish assets" that accounted for the assets as they were seized and their disposition. For these purposes, the board continued to treat each estate as a bankrupt legal entity, charging expenses even after the assets had been disposed. As a result, there was a significant discrepancy between the value of the assets for the rightful owners, and the value assessed by the confiscating authorities.

This was further complicated by the methodology employed by the legitimate Norwegian government after the war. In order to restore confiscated assets to their owners, the government was guided by public policy to alleviate the economic impact on the economy by reducing compensation to approximate a sense of fairness and finance the reconstruction of the country's economy. The assessed value was thereby reduced by the Nazis' liquidation practices and was further reduced by the discounting applied as a result of governmental policy after the war.

Norwegian estate law imposes estate tax on inheritance passed from the deceased to his/her heirs depending on the relationship between the two. This tax was compounded at each step of inheritance. As no death certificates had been issued for Jews murdered in German concentration camps, the deceased were listed as missing. Their estates were held in probate pending a declaration of death and charged for administrative expenses.

By the time all these factors had had their effect on the valuation of the confiscated assets, very little was left. In total, NOK 7.8 million was awarded to principals and heirs of Jewish property confiscated by the Nazis. This was less than the administrative fees charged by governmental agencies for probate. It did not include assets seized by the government that belonged to non-Norwegian citizens, and that of citizens that left no legal heirs. This last category was formidable, as 230 entire Jewish households were killed during the course of the Hollocaust.

== Legacy ==
=== Education and remembrance ===
Since 2002, Norway has commemorated International Holocaust Remembrance Day on 27 January. In 2003 Norway became a member of International Holocaust Remembrance Alliance (IHRA) and served as chair in 2009.

=== Monuments ===
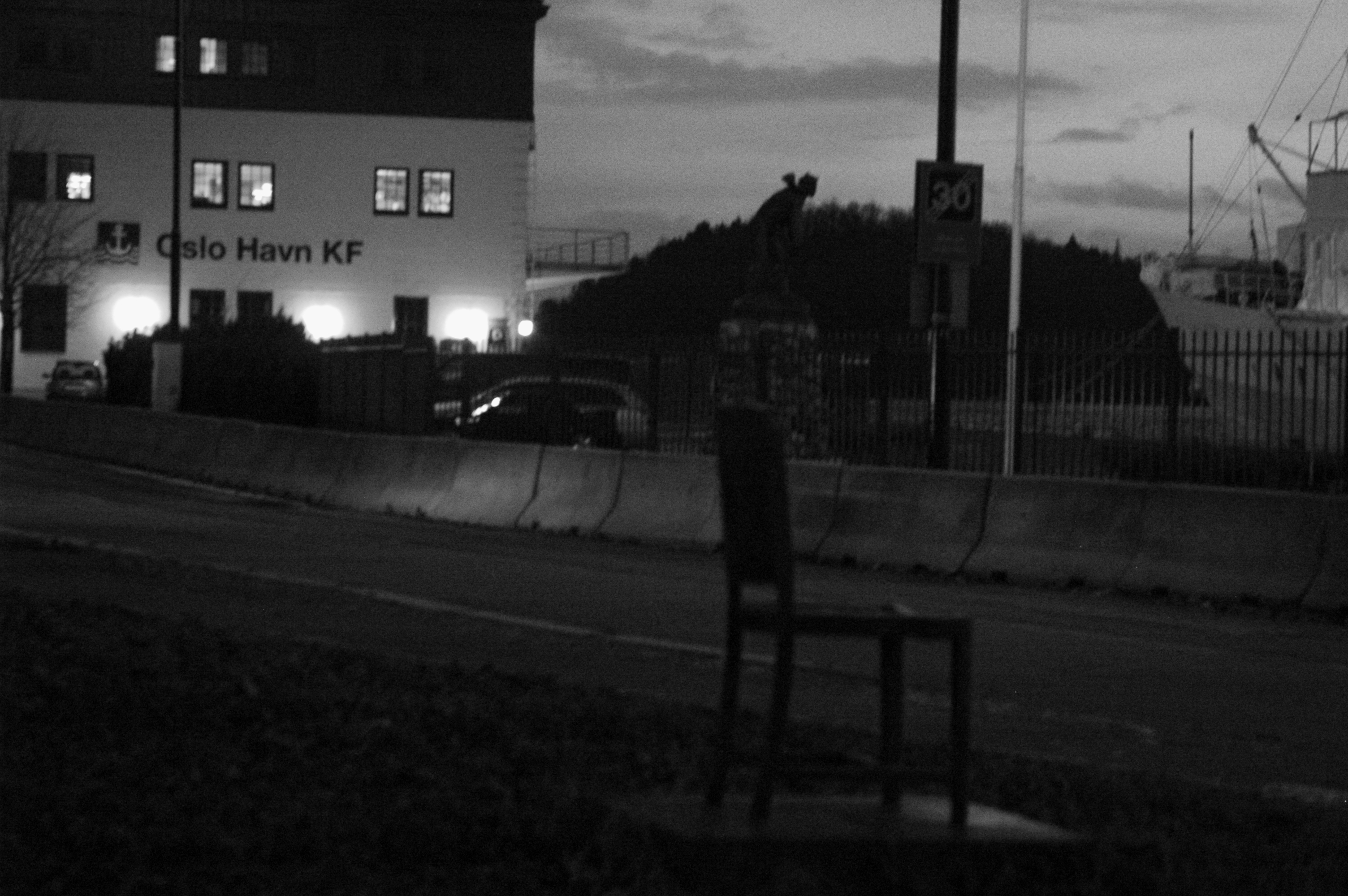
View of the pier in Oslo near the pier from which the deportations took place. The Holocaust memorial in the foreground, was unveiled in 2012. (Photo taken 26 November 2009, 67 years after the largest deportation)

Two child refugees from Bratislava, and living in Nesjestranda and deported from Norway—were memorialised on 14 September 1946 at a monolith (minnestein) in their honor, near Veøy Church.

Another Holocaust-related monument in Norway was erected in Trondheim in 1947. Other monuments followed later, in Haugesund a monument to commemorate Moritz Rabinowitz was constructed at the pier in Oslo from which the SS Donau sailed; at Falstad, in Kristiansund; in Trondheim (over Cissi Klein); and at schools have also raised awareness. Snublesteiner ("stumbling stones") have been placed in many Norwegian streets outside the apartments where Holocaust victims lived before deportation.

"Site of Remembrance" is a [Holocaust] was listen in 2022 as a protected memorial at Akershuskaia in the shape of empty chairs, by Antony Gormley.

A small area, referred to as a park near Carl Berners plass, "Dette er et fint sted" ["this is a nice place"] in Oslo, has a Holocaust monument.

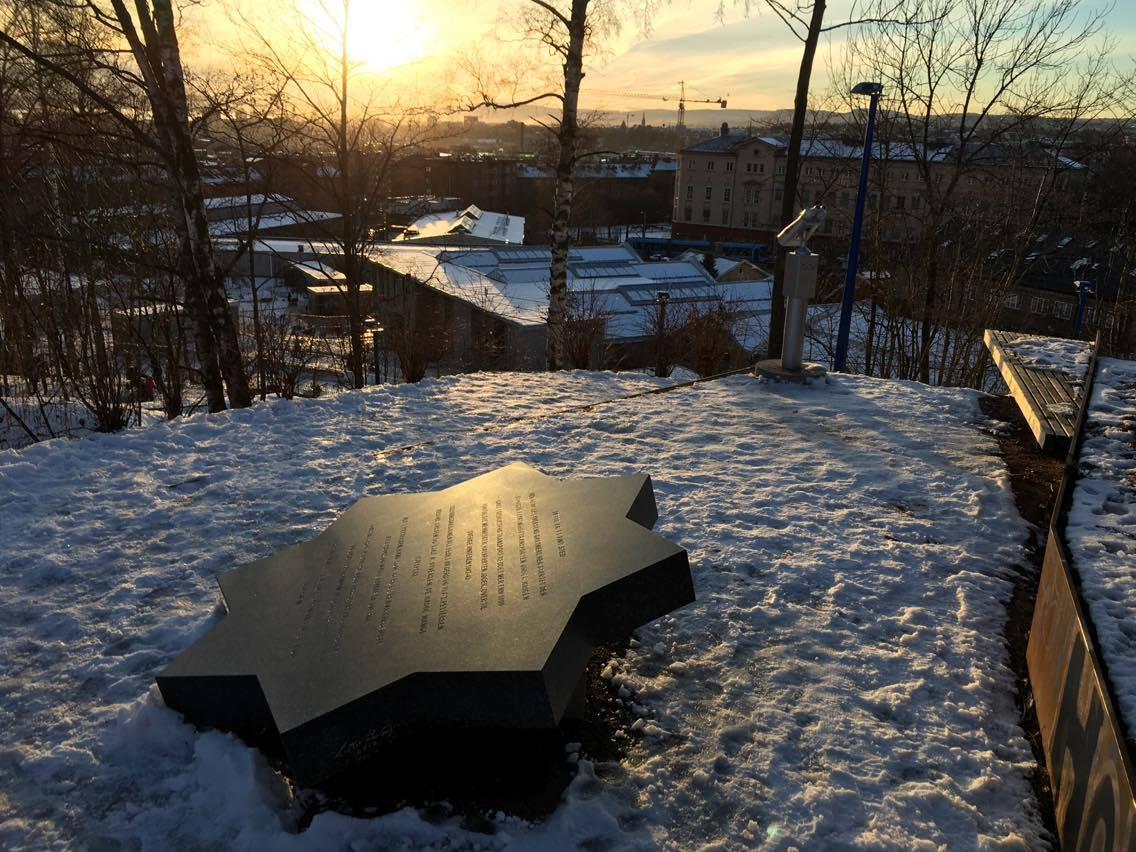
The small area, referred to as a park, "Dette er et fint sted" ["this is a nice place"] in Oslo, has a Holocaust monument. (Photo from 2017)

=== Apology and regrets ===
On the International Holocaust Remembrance Day in 2012, Prime Minister of Norway Jens Stoltenberg issued an official apology for the role played by Norwegian police in the deportations. Stoltenberg delivered his speech near the dock in the capital Oslo where 532 Jews boarded the cargo ship SS Donau on 26 November 1942, bound for Nazi camps. Stoltenberg said:

The Holocaust came to Norway on Thursday 26 November 1942. Ruth Maier was one of the many who were arrested that day. [...] Ruth Maier was last seen [outside the boarding house where she stayed,] being forced into a black truck by two big Norwegian policemen. Five days later the 22-year-old was dead. Murdered in the gas chamber at Auschwitz. Fortunately it is part of being human that we learn from our mistakes. And it is never too late. More than 50 years after the war ended, the Storting decided to make a settlement, collectively and individually, for the economic liquidation of Jewish assets. By so doing the state accepted moral responsibility for the crimes committed against Norwegian Jews during the Second World War. What about the crimes against Ruth Maier and the other Jews? The murders were unquestionably carried out by the Nazis. But it was Norwegians who carried out the arrests. It was Norwegians who drove the trucks. And it happened in Norway.

— Jens Stoltenberg, prime minister, 27 January 2012

Around the same time, National Police Commissioner Odd Reidar Humlegård said to Dagsavisen that "I wish to-, on behalf of Norwegian police—and those who participated in the deportation of Norwegian Jews to the concentration camps—express regret".

In 2015, the chief of public relations of the Norwegian State Railways, Åge-Christoffer Lundeby, said: "The transportation of Jews that were to be deported and the use of POWs on the Nordland Line is a dark chapter of NSB's history".

Media said in 2021, that "Fifty years after the Catholic Church regretted having spread hatred about Jews, [now things] might be moving toward an official apology [...] from the Church of Norway".

== Emergence of literature, film and other visual arts ==
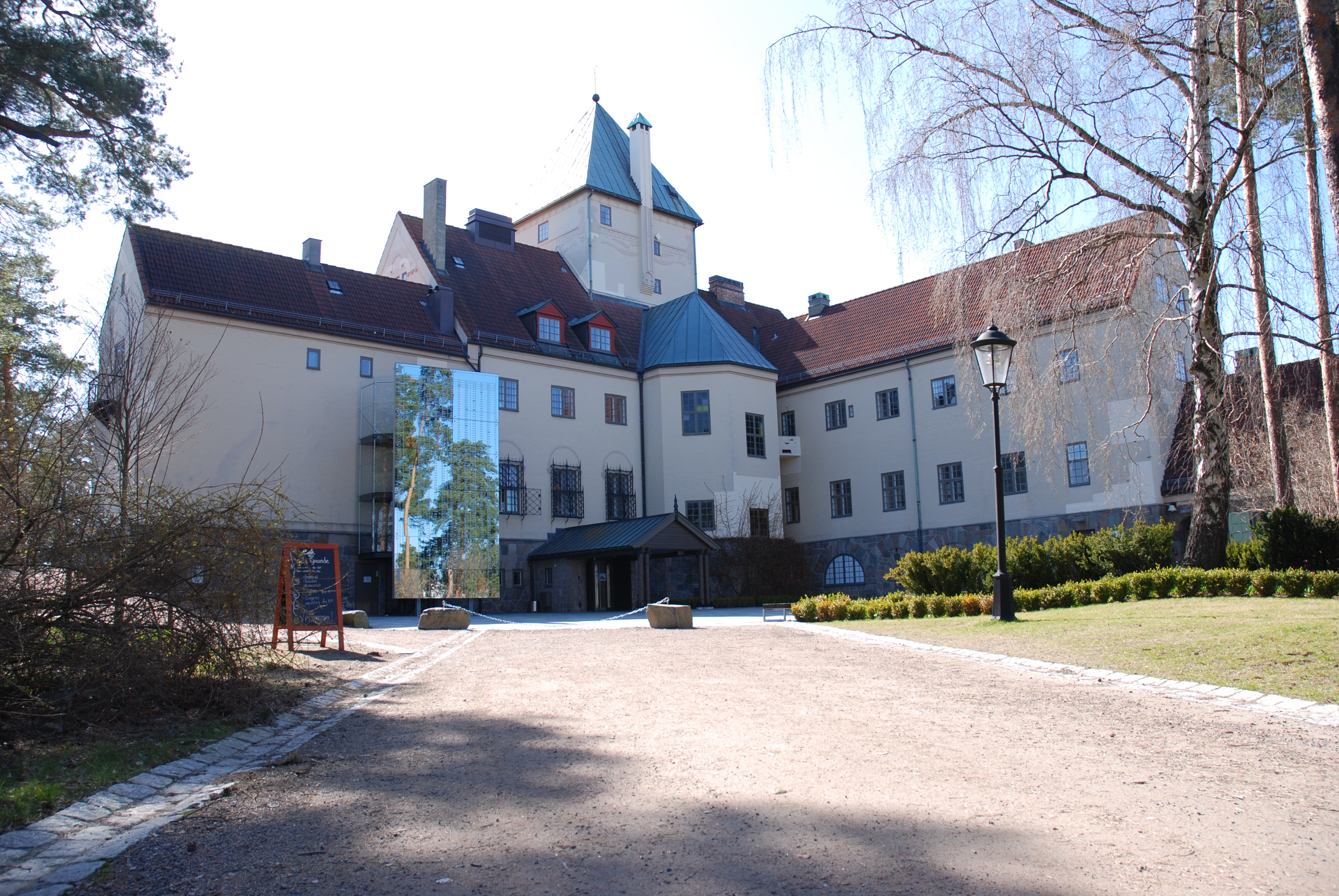
Villa Grande in Oslo became Quisling's residence in 1941. It now houses Norwegian Center for Studies of Holocaust and Religious Minorities

The first book with a first hand account of the persecution, abduction, and deportation of Jews from Norway was Moritz Nachstern's wartime memoirs published in 1949 with the title Falskmynter i blokk 19, in subsequent editions published as Falskmynter i Sachsenhausen. Although there were articles about issues related to the Holocaust, it was Herman Sachnowitz's book Det angår også deg ["it concerns you too"], published in 1978. which coincided with the American TV series Holocaust that brought significant public attention to the Norwegian history.

Per Ole Johansen's Oss selv nærmest ["closest to ourselves"] was published in 1984.

Bjørn Westlie's articles in Dagens Næringsliv in 1995, regarding [the theft or] robbery of Jewish property. created public interest in the extent of the Holocaust and participation, also after the fact, of other Norwegian institutions.

Espen Søbye's book Kathe - Always Been in Norway, was published in 2003, translated to German and to English (2019). In 2017 it was named the second-best Norwegian biography published after 1945, and in 2018 selected to be one of the 10 best Scandinavian non-fiction books published after 2000.

The author of a 2014 book (Den største forbrytelsen) received the Brage Prize. The book received great reviews, but also criticism from historians at Jødisk Museum in Oslo—Mats Tangestuen and Torill Torp-Holte—for losing sight of important nuances in the portrayal of who were helpers and who were violators.

Bjarte Bruland's Holocaust i Norge was published in 2017; it has been called "the only major study, published as a book, by a Norwegian historian".

In 2021 Espen Søbye published the book ["what do the historians know", or] Hva vet historikerne?

Berit Reisel's book Hvor ble det av alt sammen? [Where did it all go?], was published in 2021.

Synne Corell's book Likvidasjonen ["the liquidation"], was published in 2021.

Harry Rødner's book Sviket, published in 2022, combines his family's history with the results of his investigation into the policies of the Norwegian government in exile, including Haakon VII in dealing with news about the Holocaust in Norway.

The literature since 1978 can be categorized as follows:

- Comprehensive historical accounts of the Holocaust in Norway, which include Abrahamsen 1991 and the first 336 pages of Mendelsohn 1986, but also monographs such as Jan Otto Johansen (1984) and Per Ole Johansen (1984)
- Books that cover specific aspects of the Holocaust, such as Ulstein 2006 about the escapes to Sweden and Ottosen (1994) about the deportation, or Cohen (2000)
- Case studies of individuals and families. Some of these are biographical, such as Komissar (1995), Søbye (2003),
- In-depth studies on specific issues, such as Skarpnesutvalget (1997) and Johansen (2006)

One issue that has been highlighted is the hypothesis that many Norwegians viewed Jews as outsiders, whose fate was of no direct concern to Norwegians.

Prose

As early as 1950, Aimée Sommerfelt wrote a novel about a family during Holocaust in Norway - Miriam.

In 2021 Mattis Øybø published a novel about the Holocaust.

Film

The film ["the greatest crime",] Den største forbrytelsen [was released] on 25 December 2020.

Other visual arts

Since 1995 Victor Lind [... has created art about] the deportation of Norwegian Jews and in particular Knut Rød and his complicity in the logistics [of the Holocaust in Norway]; Nasjonalmuseet produced (in 2008) the traveling exhibition "Contemporary Memory" with two of Lind's video-works that have [Holocaust in Norway] as a theme.

== Research ==
The Norwegian Center for Studies of Holocaust and Religious Minorities has facilitated research about the Holocaust, and the institute has published the findings. The Falstad Center at the former site of the Falstad concentration camp provides another forum on humanitarian aspects of the German occupation. Jewish museums were (in the 21st century) established in Oslo and Trondheim, and there have been notable papers written within criminology about the legal purge in Norway after World War II. In 2010 the doctoral dissertation of Synne Corell was published as a book. In it she criticizes major works about the war, and how they deal with the fate of Norwegian Jews during World War II.

In 2011, historian Odd-Bjørn Fure said that most of the Norwegian research on the Holocaust and World War II is being conducted by the Norwegian Center for Studies of Holocaust and Religious Minorities (HL-Senteret).

In 2014 author Marte Michelet said that more research is needed about "What role did the Jewish networks have in organizing the flight[s of individuals]? Who was responsible for the warning[s], and who did the warning reach? - We know little about the money involved in the trafficking of refugees. To what degree did helpers receive payment, what sums were to be paid, and how did that play a role in who was able to flee, and who was not able to flee?"

== Memoirs ==
- Irene Levi Berman, 'We Are Going to Pick Potatoes' Norway and the Holocaust, ISBN 978-0-7618-5040-3
- Odd Nansen, From Day to Day : One Man's Diary of Survival in Nazi Concentration Camps

== See also ==
- List of Jewish deportees from Norway during World War II

== Bibliography ==
=== Works about the Holocaust in Norway ===
- "Historikk jøder fra Agder" (in Norwegian). Stiftelsen Arkivet. Archived from the original on 22 July 2011. The article depicts the fate of Jews in the Agder counties.
- Abrahamsen, Samuel (1991). Norway's Response to the Holocaust: A Historical Perspective. Holocaust Library. ISBN 0-89604-117-4. An early comprehensive treatise on the Holocaust in Norway.
- Bauman, Zygmunt (2005). Moderniteten og Holocaust. Oslo: Vidarforlaget. ISBN 9788279900306.
- Berman, Irene Levin (2008). Flukten fra Holocaust (in Norwegian). Oslo: Orion. ISBN 978-82-458-0865-0; the history of the Holocaust against the background of the author's memories of her own escape into Sweden. Published in English as: "'We Are Going to Pick Potatoes': Norway and the Holocaust, The Untold Story" (Hamilton Books, 2010, ISBN 978-0-7618-5011-3).
- Bruland, Bjarte (1995). Forsøket på å tilintetgjøre de norske jødene [The attempt to exterminate the Norwegian Jews] (in Norwegian). University of Bergen (academic thesis).
- Corell, Synne (2021). Likvidasjonen : historien om holocaust i Norge og jakten på jødenes eiendom. Oslo: Gyldendal. ISBN 9788205557093.
- Feinberg, Kai; Stefansen, Arnt (1995). Fange 79018 vender tilbake (in Norwegian). Oslo: Cappelen. ISBN 82-02-15705-6. Personal account of survivor Kai Feinberg, with historical notes by Arnt Stefansen.
- Gerstenfeld, Manfred. "Norway: The Courage of a Small Jewish Community; Holocaust Restitution and antisemitism: An interview with Bjarte Bruland and Irene Levin". Jerusalem Center for Public Affairs. Archived from the original on 16 August 2007.
- Hegtun, Halvor (31 October 2004). "Auschwitz er en del av livet". Aftenposten (in Norwegian). A newspaper article about a return to Auschwitz by Norwegian survivors.
- Johansen, Jahn Otto (1984). Det hendte også her (in Norwegian). Oslo: Cappelen. ISBN 82-02-09894-7.
- Johansen, Per Ole (1984). Oss selv nærmest: Norge og jødene 1914-1943 (in Norwegian). Oslo: Gyyldendal. ISBN 82-05-15062-1.
- Komissar, Vera; Sundvor, Bjørg (1992). Nådetid: norske jøder på flukt 1942 (in Norwegian). Oslo: Aschehoug. ISBN 82-03-17170-2. It is about twelve case examples of Norwegian Jews who escaped and survived.
- Komissar, Vera; Nyrønning, Sverre; Paltiel, Julius (1995). På tross av alt: Julius Paltiel - norsk jøde i Auschwitz (in Norwegian). Oslo: Aschehoug. ISBN 82-03-26086-1. It is about the story of Julius Paltiel, who survived deportation and imprisonment in Auschwitz.
- Lyngvi, Arne (2005). Fordi de var jøder... Da Holocaust rammet noen medmennesker i Bergen og Hordaland (in Norwegian). Bergen: Sigma forlag. ISBN 82-7916-035-3. It covers specifically the Jewish population of Bergen and Hordaland affected by the Holocaust.
- Maier, Ruth (2007). Vold, Jan Erik (ed.). Ruth Maiers dagbok : en jødisk flyktning i Norge. Oslo: Gyldendal. ISBN 9788205340381.
- Nachstern, Moritz; Arntzen, Ragnar (1949). Falskmynter i blokk 19 (in Norwegian and Norwegian Bokmål). Oslo: Tanum. ISBN 9788243004047. The first memoir of the Holocaust in Norway, also published in English as Nachstern, Moritz (2008). Counterfeiter: How a Norwegian Jew survived the Holocaust. Oxford: Osprey Publishing. ISBN 978-1846032899.
- Michelet, Marte (2014). "Den største forbrytelsen" [The greatest crime].
- Michelet, Marte (2018). Hva visste hjemmefronten?. Oslo: Gyldendal. ISBN 9788205504103.
- Norwegian Government (1997). Inndragning av jødisk eiendom i Norge under den 2. verdenskrig. Norges offentlige utredninger (in Norwegian). Oslo: Statens forvaltningstjeneste. ISBN 82-583-0437-2. NOU 1997:22 ("Skarpnesutvalget"); report from the governmental commission on the confiscation and disposition of Jewish assets. An English translation of the full minority report and a summary of the majority report was published by the Norwegian Ministry of Foreign Affairs in June 1997, but without the ministry's insignia or an ISBN registration. It was titled "The Reisel/Bruland Report on the Confiscation of Jewish Property in Norway during World War II," and is commonly known as the "blue book" and is on file at the Norwegian Center for Studies of Holocaust and Religious Minorities.
- Ottosen, Kristian (1994). I slik en natt - historien om deportasjonen av jøder fra Norge. Oslo: Aschehoug. ISBN 82-03-26049-7; on the deportation of Jews from Norway to concentration camps, including case studies.
- Sachnowitz, Herman; Arnold Jacoby (1978). Det angår også deg (in Norwegian). Stabekk: Den norske bokklubben. ISBN 82-525-0544-9. - an early personal account of a survivor's experiences.
- Savosnick, Robert; Hans Melien (1986). Jeg ville ikke dø (in Norwegian) (2nd ed.). Oslo/Risør: Cappelen (1st), Aktive Fredsforlag (2nd). ISBN 82-92627-00-6.
- Simonsen, Kjetil Braut (2020). Sørensen, Øystein (ed.). Historie og moral. Nazismen, jødene og hjemmefronten. Oslo: Dreyer. ISBN 9788282655330.
- Søbye, Espen (2003). Kathe, alltid vært i Norge (in Norwegian). Oslo: Oktober. ISBN 82-7094-926-4. Kathe - Always Been in Norway (English translation, 2019). Oslo: Krakiel. ISBN 978-82-997381-2-5.
- Ulstein, Ragnar (2006) [1995]. Jødar på flukt (in Norwegian) (2nd ed.). Samlaget. ISBN 82-521-6988-0; on the escape and underground railroad to Sweden, including case studies.
- Westlie, Bjørn (2010). Oppgjør: I skyggen av holocaust. Oslo: Aschehoug. ISBN 9788203291968.
- Westlie, Bjørn (2022). Mørke år : Norge og jødene på 1930-tallet. Oslo: Res publica. ISBN 9788282262460.
- Westlie, Bjørn (2019). Det norske jødehatet - propaganda og presse under okkupasjonen. Oslo: Res publica. ISBN 9788282260909.

=== Works about the Jewish minority in Norway ===
- Døving, Cora Alexa (2022). Døving, Cora Alexa (ed.). Jødisk : identitet, praksis og minnekultur. Oslo: Universitetsforlaget. ISBN 9788215064444.
- Mendelsohn, Oskar (1969). Jødenes historie i Norge gjennom 300 år: Bind 1 1660-1940 (in Norwegian). Universitetsforlaget. ISBN 82-00-02523-3.
- Mendelsohn, Oskar (1986). Jødenes historie i Norge gjennom 300 år: Bind 2 1940-1985 (in Norwegian) (2nd ed.). Universitetsforlaget. pp. 13–262. ISBN 82-00-02524-1. A comprehensive treatment of the Holocaust in Norway.
- Mendelsohn, Oskar (1992). Jødene i Norge: Historien om en minoritet (in Norwegian). Universitetsforlaget. ISBN 82-00-21669-1.
- Reisel, Micha, ed. (1992). Du skal fortelle det til dine barn: Det mosaiske trossamfund i Oslo 1892-1992 (in Norwegian). Oslo: Det mosaiske trossamfund i Oslo. ISBN 82-992611-0-4.
- Reitan, Jon (2005). Jødene fra Trondheim (in Norwegian). Trondheim: Tapir akademisk forlag. ISBN 82-519-2044-2.

=== Works about Norwegian World War II history ===
- Cohen, Maynar (2000). A Stand Against Tyranny: Norway's Physicians and the Nazis. Wayne State University Press. ISBN 0-8143-2934-9. It is about the resistance network organized by Norwegian physicians.
- Grimnes, Ole Kristian, ed. (1984). Norge i krig (in Norwegian). Oslo: Aschehoug. ISBN 82-03-11144-0. A comprehensive, 8-volume survey of the war in Norway, organized by topic.
- Johansen, Per Ole (2006). På siden av rettsoppgjøret. Unipub. ISBN 978-82-7477-233-5. - A series of interdisciplinary works at the University of Oslo on bias in the Legal purge in Norway after World War II.
- Books by Kristian Ottosen:
  - O., K. (1989). Natt og tåke : historien om Natzweiler-fangene (in Norwegian). Oslo: Aschehoug. ISBN 82-03-16108-1. It is about the Nacht und Nebel prisoners in the Natzweiler concentration camp, with an emphasis on the Norwegians held there.
  - O., K. (1990). Liv og død : historien om Sachsenhausen-fangene (in Norwegian). Oslo: Aschehoug. ISBN 82-03-16484-6. It is about the Sachsenhausen concentration camp.
  - O., K. (1991). Kvinneleiren : historien om Ravensbrück-fangene (in Norwegian). Oslo: Aschehoug. ISBN 82-03-16791-8. It is about the Ravensbrück concentration camp, primarily for women.
  - O., K. (1993). Bak lås og slå : historien om norske kvinner og menn i Hitlers fengsler og tukthus (in Norwegian). Oslo: Aschehoug. ISBN 82-03-26000-4. It is about the deportation and imprisonment of Norwegian men and women in prisons throughout Germany.
  - O., K. (1995). Nordmenn i fangenskap 1940-1945 (in Norwegian). Oslo: Universitetsforlaget. ISBN 82-00-22372-8. It is an authoritative list of Norwegian individuals who had been held in German captivity during World War II.
- Ringdal, Nils Johan (1987). Mellom barken og veden: politiet under okkupasjonen. Oslo: Aschehoug. ISBN 82-03-15616-9. It is about the role of Norwegian police during the occupation.
