= Hellmuth Reinhard =

Head of the Gestapo in Norway

SS-Sturmbannführer Hellmuth Reinhard
- Born: Hermann Gustav Hellmuth Patzschke; 24 July 1911; Hohenmölsen, Province of Saxony, German Empire
- Died: 28 October 2002 (aged 91) Heidelberg, Baden-Württemberg, Germany
- Allegiance: Nazi Germany
- Branch: Schutzstaffel
- Service years: 1933–1945
- Rank: SS-Sturmbannführer
- Commands: Head of the Gestapo in Nazi-occupied Norway (January 1942 – February 1945)
- Conflicts: World War II

Hellmuth Reinhard (born Hermann Gustav Hellmuth Patzschke; 24 July 1911 – 28 October 2002) was a German SS-Sturmbannführer who is best known for being head of the Gestapo in Nazi-occupied Norway from 1942 to 1945 during World War II. After the war, Reinhard evaded capture for nearly two decades before being arrested in 1964. He died in 2002.

== Background ==
Reinhard was born Hermann Gustav Hellmuth Patzschke on 24 July 1911 in Weißenfels in the Prussian Province of Saxony in the German Empire. He studied law in Vienna, Leipzig, and Berlin, graduating in 1938.

Patzschke changed his last name to the more Germanic Reinhard in 1939. In 1940, he married Gunhild Röschmann and had three daughters.

== Nazi official ==
=== SS career ===
A member of the Hitler Youth (Hitlerjugend) from a young age, Reinhard became a member of the SS (serial number 121174) in March 1933 and a member of the NSDAP (serial number 2.382.157) in May of the same year. The SS was at that time an organisation which recruited younger men distancing themselves from the "hoodlum character of the SA and the party and who looked upon the SS as an elite order, spiritually and politically."

Reinhard served in the Sicherheitsdienst from 1935 in Leipzig and Berlin. In September 1938, he was given the title Regierungsassesor and became the head of the Historical Commission for the Reichsführer-SS in Vienna and Prague. He was transferred to the Sicherheitspolizei (SiPo) in September 1939, where he was tasked with investigating the assassination of Austrian Chancellor Engelbert Dollfuss. During this time, Reinhard wished to join the Waffen-SS but was permanently excluded as a candidate after breaking his leg in the Netherlands. On 8 August 1940, he became leader of the Zentralstelle für jüdische Auswanderung in Amsterdam until 3 November 1941, when he became deputy commander for the Gestapo in Kiev.

=== Role in Norway ===
On 28 January 1942, Reinhard was sent to Norway. By 1943, he had been given the rank of SS-Sturmbannführer and made head of SiPo's Abteilung IV (the Gestapo), stationed at Victoria Terrasse in Oslo. He was placed there on personal orders from Heinrich Himmler. Under the command of Heinrich Fehlis, he led the fight against the Norwegian resistance and oversaw the torture of prisoners. He was even feared by his own men, who after the war claimed that he had threatened to send them to northern Norway or to concentration camps if they disobeyed orders. In the summer of 1944, following an order from Hitler, the fate of SiPo prisoners was no longer decided in court, but rather by an assessment made by Reinhard. Later that year, a group of Norwegians were secretly executed at Trandum leir as a result of what was called "kontordom" (office judgement) by Norwegian prisoners. During his time in Norway, Reinhard was also involved in the deportation of Jews and a series of murders carried out as part of Operation Blumenpflücken.

Near the end of the war, Reinhard started inviting young male prisoners to dinner in his home, where he would hold conversations on philosophy, literature, and politics. In some occasions, this enabled the invitees to have other prisoners freed. It is unknown what Reinhard's purpose was in hosting these meals; he would drink heavily towards the end and sometimes mentioned death sentences for which he had a bad conscience.

=== After Norway ===
On 1 February 1945, Reinhard was transferred from Norway to the Sudetenland. Here he became leader of the Gestapo in Reichenberg, a role he would hold until the Nazi capitulation.

== Post-war years ==
Following the end of World War II in Europe, Reinhard started using the alias Hermann Patzschke when he was arrested by the British. Escaping identification, he was released and worked as a traffic manager in Böblingen near Stuttgart. At some point he was briefly imprisoned and interrogated by the Americans, before becoming a clerk in a US Army regiment in Mannheim. From the autumn of 1948, Reinhard held various jobs in the publishing industry, eventually settling in Schleswig-Holstein.

With new his identity, Reinhard was able to remarry his wife in December 1951, who had been posing as the widow of Hellmuth Reinhard.

It was not until 1964 that West German police identified Hermann Patzschke as Hellmuth Reinhard and arrested him for war crimes. On 30 June 1967 he was sentenced to five years in prison. Reinhard was released from prison in 1970 and died in 2002.

== See also ==
- Ernst Weiner
- Josef Terboven
- Siegfried Fehmer
- Wilhelm Rediess
- Arkivet (Kristiansand)
- Grini detention camp
- Nazi concentration camps in Norway
