= Ernst Weiner =

German SS officer (1913–1945)

Ernst Josef Albert Weiner
- Born: 13 December 1913; Neustadt an der Waldnaab, Kingdom of Bavaria, German Empire
- Died: 17 December 1945 (aged 32) Akershus Fortress, Oslo, Norway
- Cause of death: Suicide by gunshot
- Allegiance: Nazi Germany
- Branch: Schutzstaffel
- Service years: 1936–1945
- Rank: SS-Hauptsturmführer
- Conflicts: World War II, Operation Blumenpflücken

Ernst Josef Albert Weiner (13 December 1913 – 17 December 1945) was a German SS-Hauptsturmführer during World War II. He was most noted for his role in Operation Blumenpflücken during the occupation of Norway by Nazi Germany.

== Early life ==
Ernst Weiner was born on 13 December 1913 in Neustadt an der Waldnaab, Bavaria, Germany, to a merchant father. After high school, he attended a seminary for a year to train as a Catholic priest, before giving up theology and working for a time in the Bavarian administration.

== World War II ==
Weiner became a member of the German National Socialist Party (NSDAP) in 1935 and joined the Nuremberg police in 1936. His first police job was at the passport office and later he supervised religious sects. He then worked to secure German industry against sabotage. With the help and friendship of the Nuremberg police president, Dr. Benno Martin, Weiner advanced to become a police adjutant.

In February 1944, Weiner was stationed in Norway, where he held the ranks of SS-Hauptsturmführer and Kriminalrat. He was head of Gestapo Office IV N in Oslo, which operated under the Sicherheitspolizei.

Weiner was involved in a retaliation operation named Operation Blumenpflücken, and personally conducted four murders as part of it, killing Einar Hærland, Sigurd Roll, Gunnar Spangen and Sigrid Hammerø. However, historians Arnfinn Moland and Tore Pryser do not include Hammerø in this list, placing the number of victims at three.

== Post-war and death ==
Following the Nazi surrender and end of World War II in Europe on 8 May 1945, Weiner disguised himself in a Wehrmacht uniform and used a false name to blend in with imprisoned German soldiers at a camp near Støren in Sør-Trøndelag. Despite being recognised at the camp, and the fact he was wanted for war crimes, Weiner was transferred back to Germany to a camp in Bremen. British authorities eventually realised what had happened and had him returned to Norway. The two personnel responsible for letting him return to Germany were both fired.

Weiner was interrogated as a part of the post-war legal purge in Norway, but was never convicted: on 17 December 1945, while being held at the Akershus Fortress, he shot and killed himself and a fellow prisoner. However, it has been claimed by fellow inmates that he was murdered as an act of revenge.

== See also ==
- Heinrich Fehlis
- Hellmuth Reinhard
- Josef Terboven
- Siegfried Fehmer
- Wilhelm Rediess
- Grini detention camp
- Reichskommissariat Norwegen
