= Carl Fredriksens Transport =

Operation during World War II to help Jews in Norway

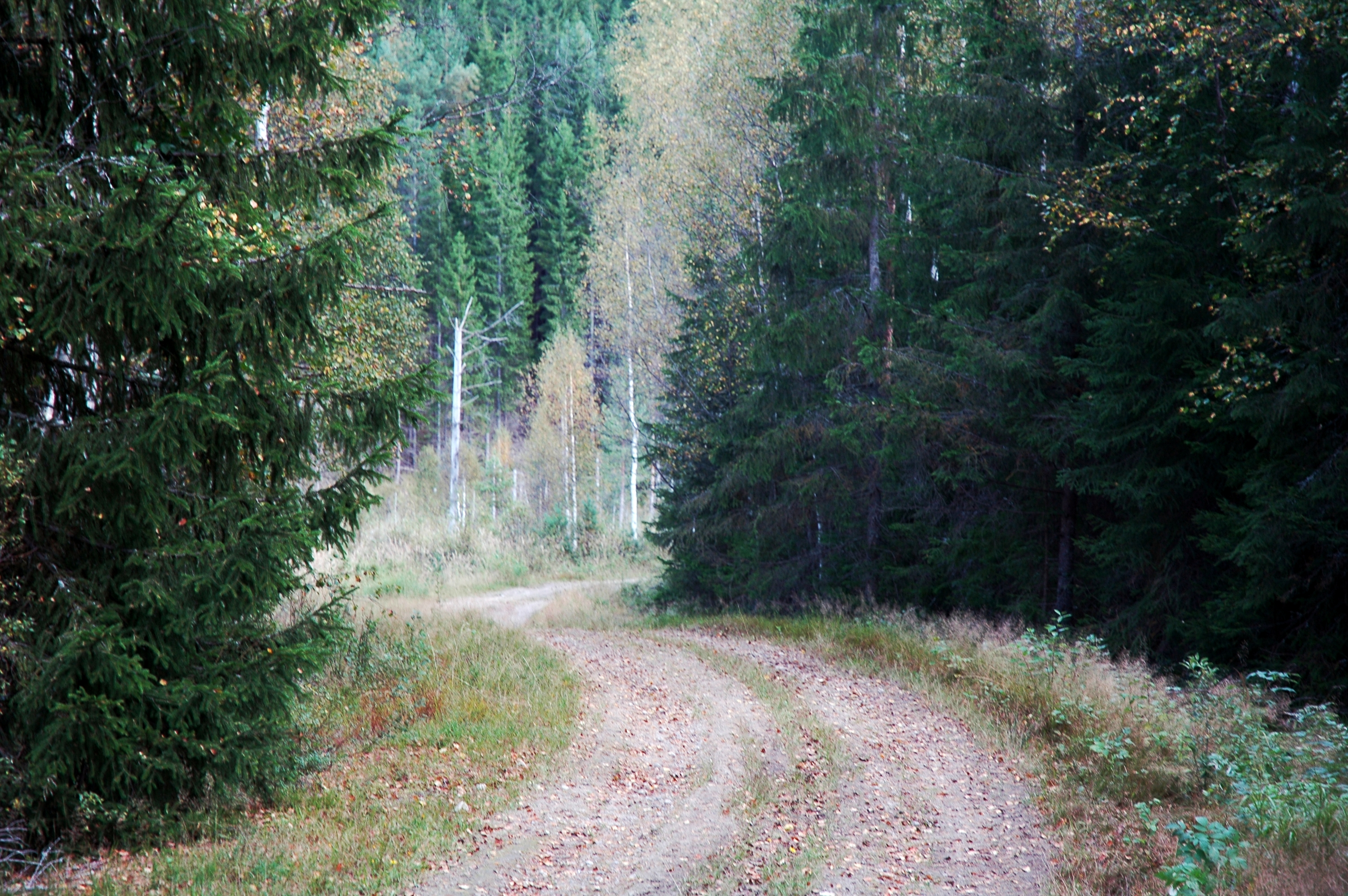
View into Sweden from the route's border crossing

Carl Fredriksens Transport was the code name for an operation during the occupation of Norway by Nazi Germany to help Jews and other persecuted Norwegians escape persecution, deportation, and murder in death camps.

== Background ==
The Nazi regime in Norway implemented its part of the Holocaust through a series of steps, starting with registration, then confiscation, internment and concentration, and ultimately deportation of Jews, primarily to Auschwitz. Some Jews had fled Norway to Sweden earlier in the war, but most had stayed in their homes until October 26, 1942. At that point, most men were arrested and detained in prison camps, while women and children were ordered to report to the nearest police station on a daily basis.

== The escape operation ==
Although the Norwegian resistance movement had maintained a network of escape routes to Sweden, they were unprepared to deal with the urgent plight of Jews who faced deportation. In addition, simultaneously with the arrest and deportation of Jews in 1942, the Gestapo launched an offensive to identify and apprehend members of the Norwegian resistance. This put pressure both on the viability and capacity of existing escape routes.

Carl Fredriksens Transport (named after Norway's King Haakon VII whose real name was Christian Frederik Carl Georg Valdemar Axel) came into being when four Jewish Norwegians appeared on the doorstep of nursery owner Rolf A. Syversen, asking for help. Through one of the leaders of Milorg, Ole Berg, Syversen contacted Alf Tollef Pettersen, who had been fired from the Norwegian police force for refusing to pledge loyalty to the Quisling regime. Pettersen had been hired to manage transportation and was intimately familiar with the roads from Oslo to the border to Sweden through Østfold.

What started with a few nighttime drives turned into a large-scale operation. The group accepted all refugees, but charged those who could afford it 180 kroner. In time, the Norwegian resistance group Sivorg put its clandestine network and financial resources behind it. Pettersen, his wife Gerd, Syversen, and the resistance leader Reidar Larsen managed the operation. Altogether about 1,000 refugees were moved to safety, of whom approximately 500 were Jewish. The name Carl Fredriksens Transport was based on the original name of the exiled Norwegian king Haakon VII, who was Carl, son of Fredrik, but also sounded like a common Norwegian name.

After having found their way to Syversen's nursery near Carl Berners plass in Oslo, refugees were loaded on the backs of trucks, and covered by a tarp. Children were often sedated. Gerd Pettersen forged bills of lading and other necessary documents. Sivorg's network along the route would monitor German or border police patrols.

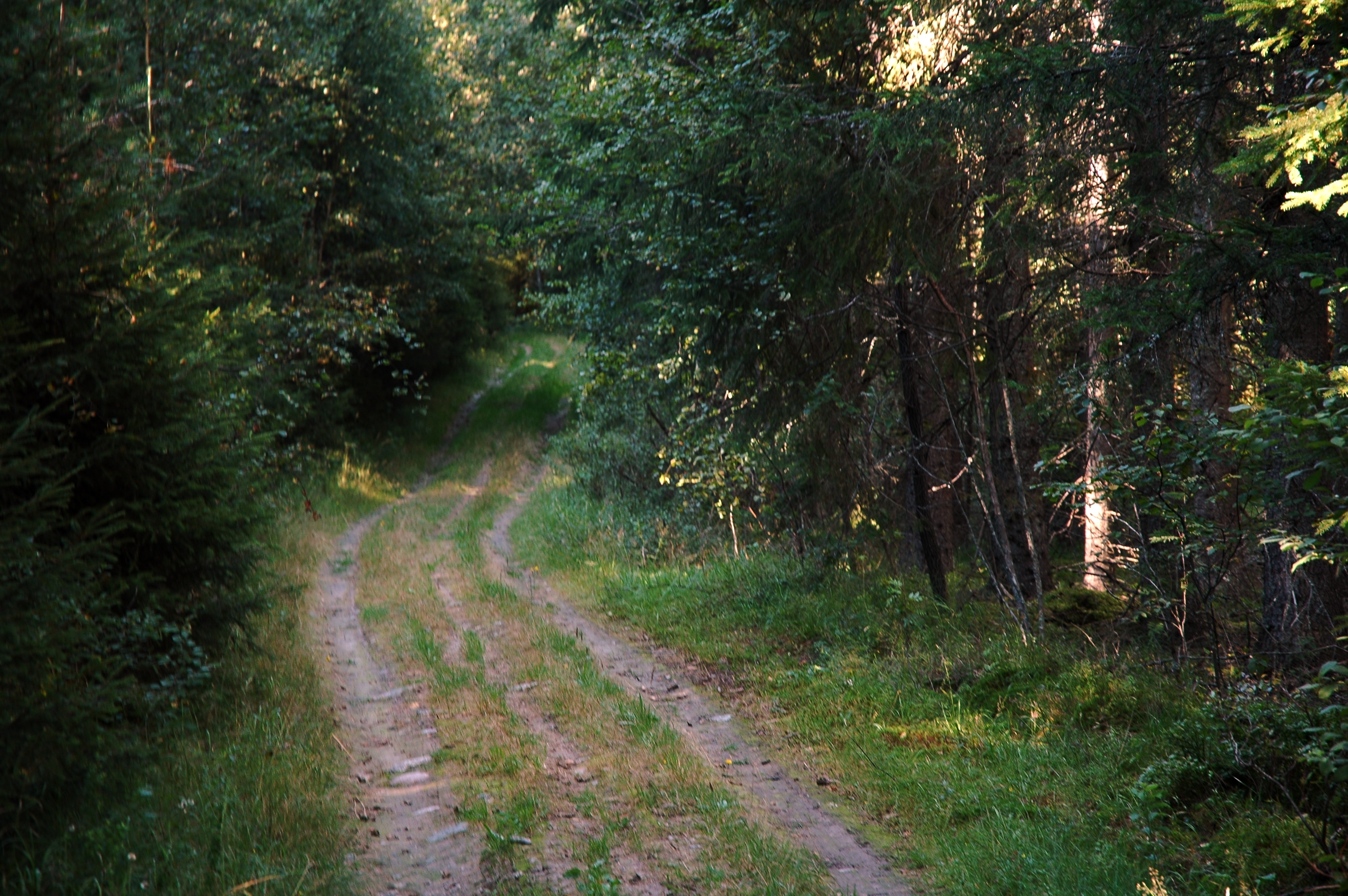
The last leg of the route followed this road the last few hundred meters to the border

The route varied somewhat, but would typically end up near Orderudseter, just a few hundred yards short of the Swedish border. The refugees would walk this last distance.

The operation started in late November 1942. About ten truckloads a week went to the border and back in the dark of night, mostly with headlights off. By mid-January, the network had been infiltrated by Norwegian collaborators and had to be shut down. The Pettersens made a successful dash for the border in a sedan, breaking the axle just as they crossed into Sweden. Rolf Syversen stayed in Oslo, but was arrested for an unrelated matter in June. He was executed at Trandumskogen in November 1944.

== Commemoration ==
Although this was the largest rescue operation in Norway during World War II, it was virtually unknown for decades. In order to maintain operational security, the refugees were not aware that they were part of a larger scheme, and their rescuers' identities were kept secret in any event. Ragnar Ulstein, a historian who specialized in the stream of refugees from Norway to Sweden, uncovered the most important features during an interview with Alf Tollef Pettersen. Oslo Jewish Museum has continued the research started by Ulstein and interviewed Gerd Pettersen before she died.

In September 2010, a commemorative plaque and cast-iron truck were unveiled at the turn-off to the private road that went to the Swedish border. Filmmaker Robert Murphree is working to create a movie about the operation, historian Mats Tangestuen at Oslo Jewish Museum is writing a book, and artist Victor Lind is creating a public space at the site of Syversen's nursery he is calling "This is a Good Place" (Dette er et fint sted).

A bicycle ride, named after the operation, takes place in mid-August from Fetsund, along the original route and to the border crossing to Sweden. The Pettersen's granddaughter Ane Munkeby arranges the ride.

== Aftermath ==
In 2018 Marte Michelet mentioned a "Reidar Larsen" in her book; in 2021 she apologised for having made analyses of a name-fellow of Reidar Larsen.
