= Bjørn Westlie =

Norwegian journalist, historian, university college lecturer and non-fiction writer

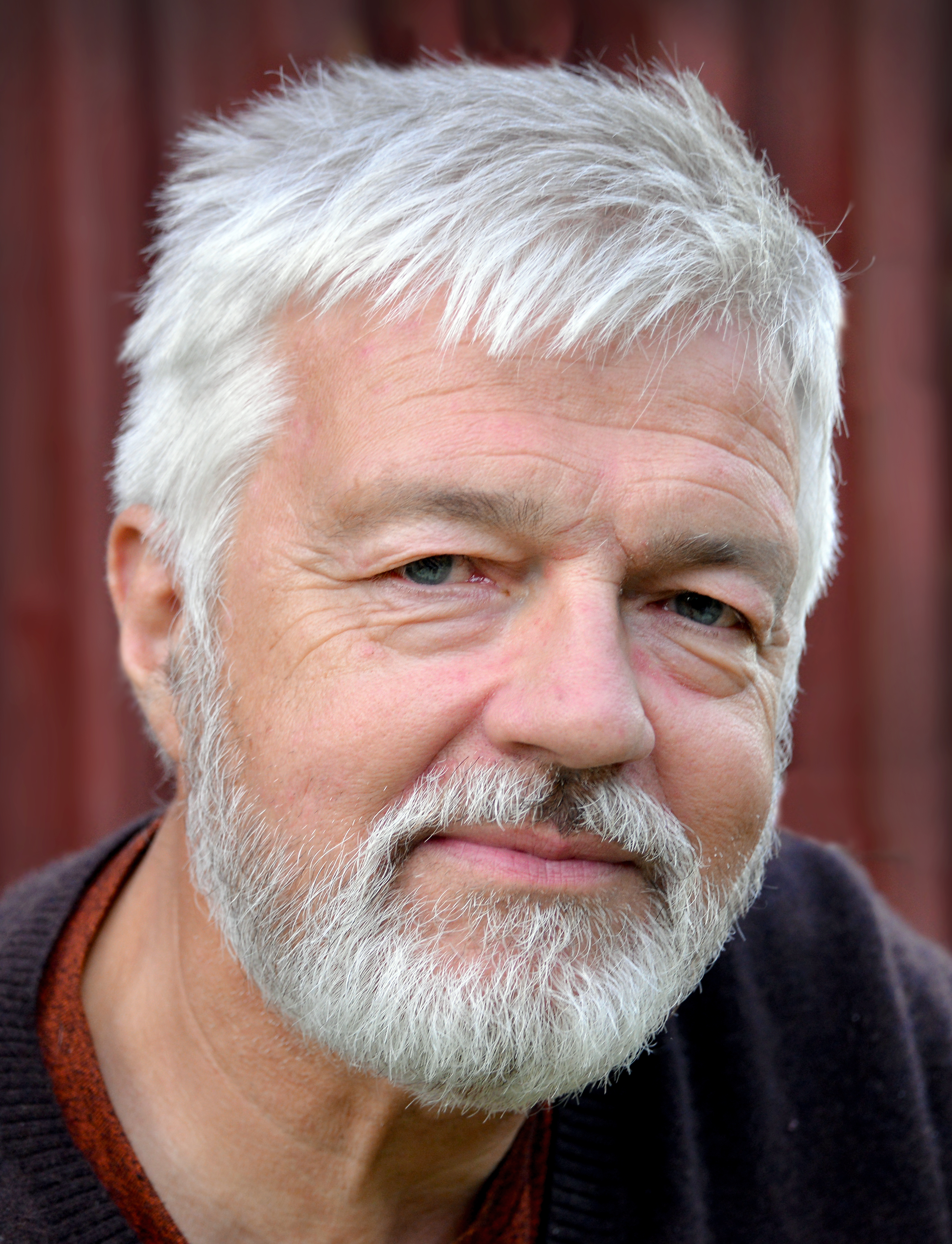
- Photo from 2014
- Born: 23 July 1949 (age 76)
- Occupations: Journalist, historian, university college lecturer and non-fiction writer
- Spouse: Anne Hege Simonsen
- Awards: Brage Prize (2008)

Bjørn Petter Westlie (born 23 July 1949) is a Norwegian journalist, historian, university college lecturer and non-fiction writer.

== Career ==
In 1995, as a journalist for the newspaper Dagens Næringsliv, Westlie published a major article about the looting of the Norwegian Jews during the Second World War. In many cases the survivors were not able to reclaim any valuables, businesses or properties.

Together with historian Bjarte Bruland’s research this article started a public settlement process ending with the Government giving financial compensation and issuing a public apology.

In most of his books Westlie has focused on the Second World War. Maktens ansikt (The Face of Power) from 1991 is a portrait of Milorg leader and later politician Jens Chr. Hauge. In 2002 he published Oppgjør: I skyggen av Holocaust (Revisitation – In the Shadow of the Holocaust). Fars krig (My Father’s War) from 2008 told the story about his father, who was an SS volunteer. This book received the Brage Prize for non-fiction for 2008, and was later translated into Ukrainian.

His book, Fangene som forsvant. NSB og slavearbeiderne på Nordlandsbanen (The Disappeared Prisoners. NSB (Norwegian State Railways) and the Slave Labourers on the Nordland Line) came out in 2015.

In 2019 he published the book Det norske jødehatet: propaganda og presse under okkupasjonen.

== Radicalism ==
For about ten years, from 1974 and onward, Bjørn Westlie was a member of the Workers' Communist Party. In interviews he has described his activism mainly as a reaction to the Vietnam War. According to himself, Westlie has repeatedly been rethinking his own embrace of extreme political movements when trying to decipher his father’s choices.

== Personal life ==
Westlie was born on 23 July 1949.

Bjørn Westlie lives in Oslo. He is married to researcher, journalist, university college lecturer and writer Anne Hege Simonsen. As of 2013 he had two daughters and one grandchild.

== Selected works ==
- 1988: I grenselandet: når forskning flytter grensen mellom liv og død., Universitetsforlaget
- 1991: Maktens ansikt: et portrett av Jens Chr. Hauge – with Alf Ole Ask, Gyldendal
- 1995: Drømmen om det perfekte mennesket. Fra arvehygiene til genhygiene, Gyldendal
- 1996: Coming to terms with the past: The process of restitution of Jewish property in Norway, Institute of the World Jewish Congress
- 2002: Oppgjør – I skyggen av Holocaust, Aschehoug
- 2008: Fars krig, Aschehoug
- 2012: Hitlers norske budbringere, Aschehoug
- 2015: Fangene som forsvant. NSB og slavearbeiderne på Nordlandsbanen, Spartacus
- 2019: Det norske jødehatet - propaganda og presse under okkupasjonen, Res Publica
- 2022: Mørke år. Norge og jødene på 1930-tallet, Res Publica

== See also ==
- The history of the Norwegian State Railways

Awards
Preceded by Frank Rossavik	Recipient of the Brage Prize for prose 2008	Succeeded by Kjetil Østli
