= Sigurd Roll =

Norwegian sprinter and diplomat

Sigurd Emil Roll
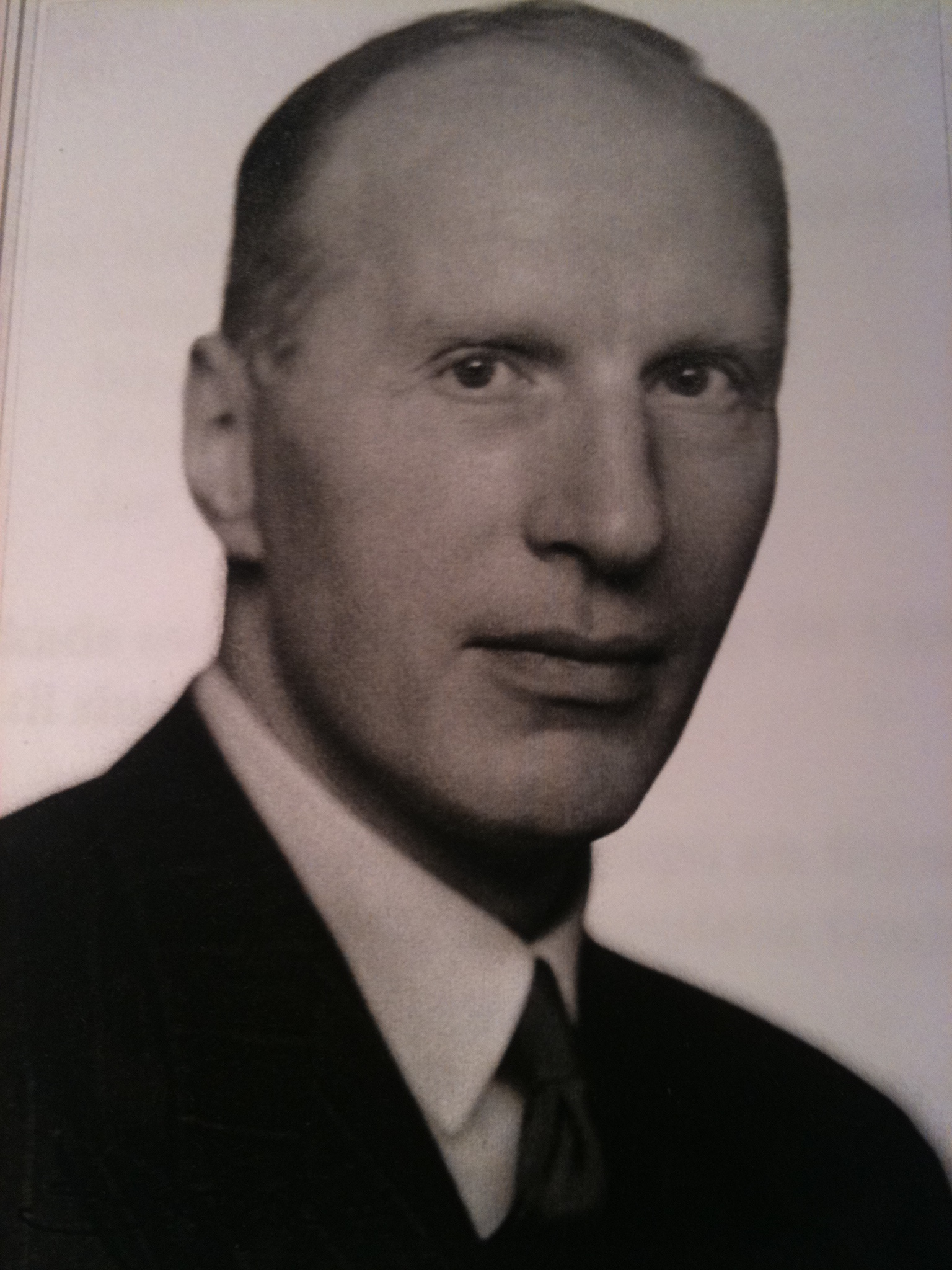
- Sigurd Emil Roll, diplomat and sportsman
- Born: October 14, 1893; Chicago, Illinois, USA
- Died: June 24, 1944 (aged 50); Oslo, Norway
- Occupation: Diplomat
- Known for: Olympic sprinter; silver medalist

Sigurd Emil Roll (14 October 1893 – 24 June 1944) was a Norwegian diplomat and former sprinter who was executed during the occupation of Norway by Nazi Germany. His brother William was a US diplomat.

== Early life and family ==
Roll was born in Chicago to Wilhelm Jørgen Roll (born 1864 in Asker, Norway) and Sofia Jensen (born 1868 in Asker, Norway). Roll was married in 1918, and had four children. His son Finn joined the Devil's Brigade during World War II.

== Olympic athlete ==
As an athlete he became Norwegian champion in the 400 metres event in 1917. He broke the Norwegian record this year, clocking in 50.9 seconds. He improved his own record to 50.7 seconds in 1920, but lost it to Einar Mangset the following season. He also won silver medals in the 400 metres in 1918 and 1920, as well as medals in the 100 and 200 metres. He represented the sports club Kristiania IF.

== Diplomatic and resistance fighter ==
Roll later served as a US vice consul in Oslo. During the occupation of Norway by Nazi Germany Roll resigned his post and joined the Norwegian underground. He was captured by the Gestapo and imprisoned in a concentration camp for a period. After his release, he allegedly helped Norwegians escape from concentration camps.

== Death ==
On June 24, 1944, Roll was arrested in his office and executed at Holmenkollen Kapell (Oslo) as a part of Operation Blumenpflücken, an attempt to discredit the Norwegian resistance. SS Hauptsturmführer and Sicherheitspolizei officer Ernst Weiner was personally responsible for the murder.
