= Einar Hærland =

Norwegian military officer

Einar Hærland (3 January 1909 – 12 June 1944) was a Norwegian military officer who was executed during the occupation of Norway by Nazi Germany.

He was born in Solum Municipality to Ole Hærland and his wife Marie, née Knudsen. Einar Hærland married, had two children, and settled in Oslo with his family.

Hærland embarked on a military career and was promoted to captain following the battles in Northern Norway during the Norwegian Campaign. When the fighting subsided and Germany occupied Norway, he was employed by the police while also engaging in illegal resistance work. When the Nazi police leader Gunnar Lindvig was assassinated by the Norwegian resistance in May 1944, Hærland was executed by Sicherheitspolizei officer Ernst Weiner as a reprisal. His execution marked the beginning of a broader retaliation operation called Operation Blumenpflücken. Hærland is buried at Vestre gravlund.

Comedian Anne-Kat Hærland is Einar Hærland's granddaughter.
