= Anne Hege Simonsen =

Norwegian social anthropologist and journalist

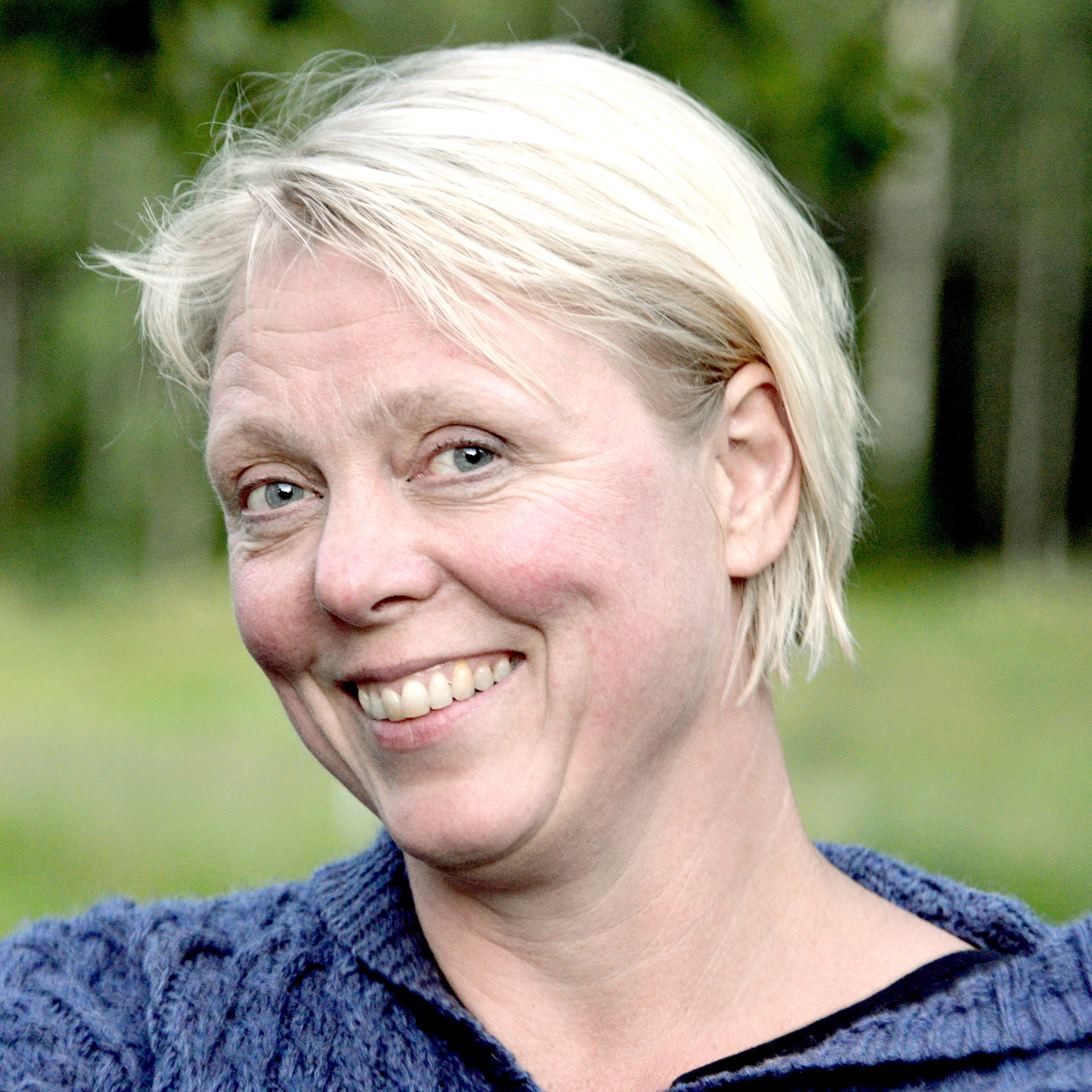

Anne Hege Simonsen (born 1 April 1965) is a Norwegian social anthropologist and journalist.

Simonsen has worked as a journalist in NRK and Klassekampen, she has been the editor of Ny Tid and Verdensmagasinet X and is now an associate professor of journalism at Oslo and Akershus University College. She has published several non-fiction books, among others a biography on Norwegian aviation pioneer Tryggve Gran.

Anne Hege Simonsen is married to journalist and writer Bjørn Westlie.
