= Heinrich Fehlis =

German Schutzstaffel (SS) officer (1906–1945)

SS-Oberführer Heinrich Fehlis
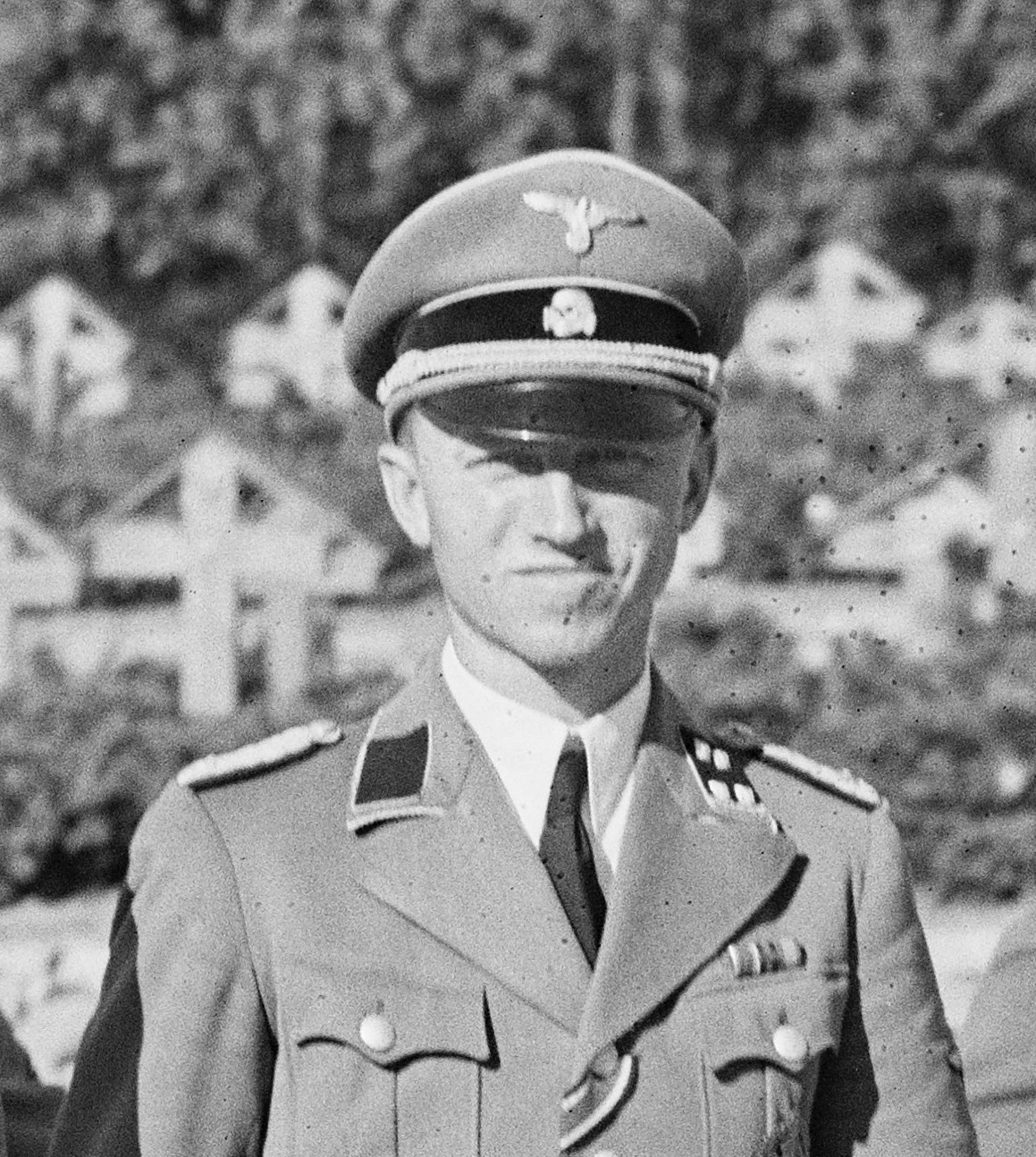
- Fehlis in 1941
- Born: 1 November 1906; Wulften am Harz, German Empire
- Died: 11 May 1945 (aged 38); Porsgrunn, Telemark, Norway
- Burial place: Eidanger Church, Norway
- Military career
- Allegiance: Nazi Germany
- Branch: Schutzstaffel
- Service years: 1933-1935: Sturmabteilung; 1935-1945: Schutzstaffel
- Rank: SS-Oberführer
- Commands: Head of Sicherheitsdienst and Sicherheitspolizei for Norway and Oslo
- Conflicts: World War II

Heinrich Fehlis (1 November 1906 – 11 May 1945) was a German Schutzstaffel (SS) officer during World War II. He commanded the Sicherheitspolizei (SiPo) and Sicherheitsdienst (SD) in Norway and Oslo during the German occupation of Norway.

== Background ==
Heinrich Fehlis was born on 1 November 1906 in the village of Wulften am Harz, northeast of Göttingen, Germany. He was a newly educated attorney when Hitler rose to power in 1933, joining the SA that year on 1 April and the Nazi Party on 1 May. On 10 September 1935, Fehlis joined the SS, where he successfully applied to work for the Gestapo in Berlin. Rising through the ranks in Stuttgart and Frankfurt, he gained a reputation for skill and was promoted to SS-Sturmbannführer in April 1940. He then taught a course for police officers until he was ordered to Norway as part of Operation Weserübung.

== German occupation of Norway ==
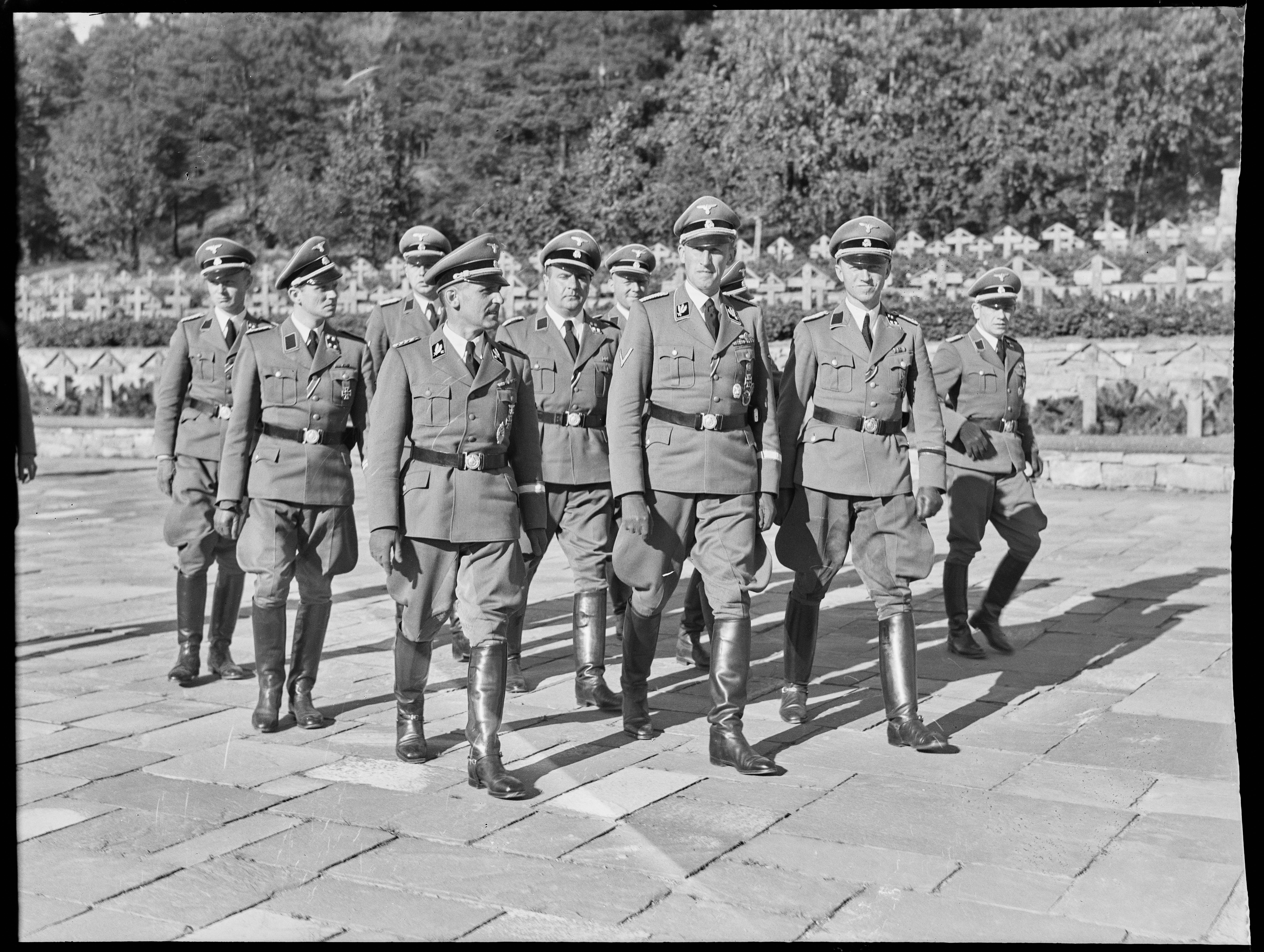
Georg Wilhelm Müller (front row, to the left) Reinhard Heydrich (centre), and Heinrich Fehlis (to the right) visiting a war cemetery in Oslo, Norway, in 1941.

On 21 April 1940, Fehlis became leader of the Einsatzkommando in Oslo and, in November, he succeeded Walter Stahlecker in the role of both Befehlshaber der Sicherheitspolizei und des SD (BdS) of Norway and in the subordinate command of Kommandeur der Sicherheitspolizei und des SD (KdS) in Oslo. He rose to the rank of SS-Standartenführer, reporting to Reinhard Heydrich and Ernst Kaltenbrunner in Berlin and Wilhelm Rediess and Josef Terboven in Norway. In June 1944, he was promoted to SS-Oberführer.

Together with his subordinate, Hellmuth Reinhard, Fehlis regulated the use of torture and sentenced prisoners to death in so-called "office judgements". 151 Norwegians were executed without trial, the majority on direct orders from Fehlis.

General Nikolaus von Falkenhorst (Commander of the Wehrmacht in Norway) gave the following description of Fehlis: "[he] was really a quiet, modest man and always very polite to me. By the way, I am fully aware that he has had me and my staff under close supervision for all these years".

It has been suggested that Fehlis took a milder approach towards the end of the war, possibly fearing reprisals in the case of a German defeat. Despite already having a family in Germany, he entered a relationship with a Norwegian woman named Else Johanne Schaug, who gave birth to his daughter Venke Fehlis in January 1945.

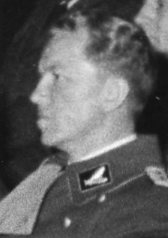
Heinrich Fehlis in 1944.

== German capitulation and suicide ==
Following the German surrender on 8 May 1945 and the end of World War II in Europe, Fehlis and other SS officials attempted to escape capture by Milorg. He arranged for Gestapo members to be hidden among ordinary soldiers in the Wehrmacht, personally leading a force of around 75 men disguised in Gebirgskorps Norwegen uniforms to a military camp near Porsgrunn. Following a tip-off, the camp fell under suspicion and was surrounded. During negotiations, Fehlis (who impersonated a lieutenant named "Gerstheuer") requested an hour to prepare for surrender. Milorg agreed, but when they finally entered the camp it was in a disorderly condition with many of the Germans in a state of intoxication. Fehlis' body was discovered in one of the camp rooms; he had found the means to first poison, then shoot himself. He was buried at Eidanger Church.

Else Schaug escaped to Sweden with her and Fehlis' daughter Venke. In 2012, Venke released a book about her experience growing up as his daughter.

== See also ==
- Ernst Weiner
- Alfred Zeidler
- Siegfried Fehmer
- Victoria Terrasse
- Beisfjord massacre
- Operation Blumenpflücken
- Espeland detention camp
- Grini detention camp
- Nazi concentration camps in Norway
