= Bjarte Bruland =

Norwegian historian

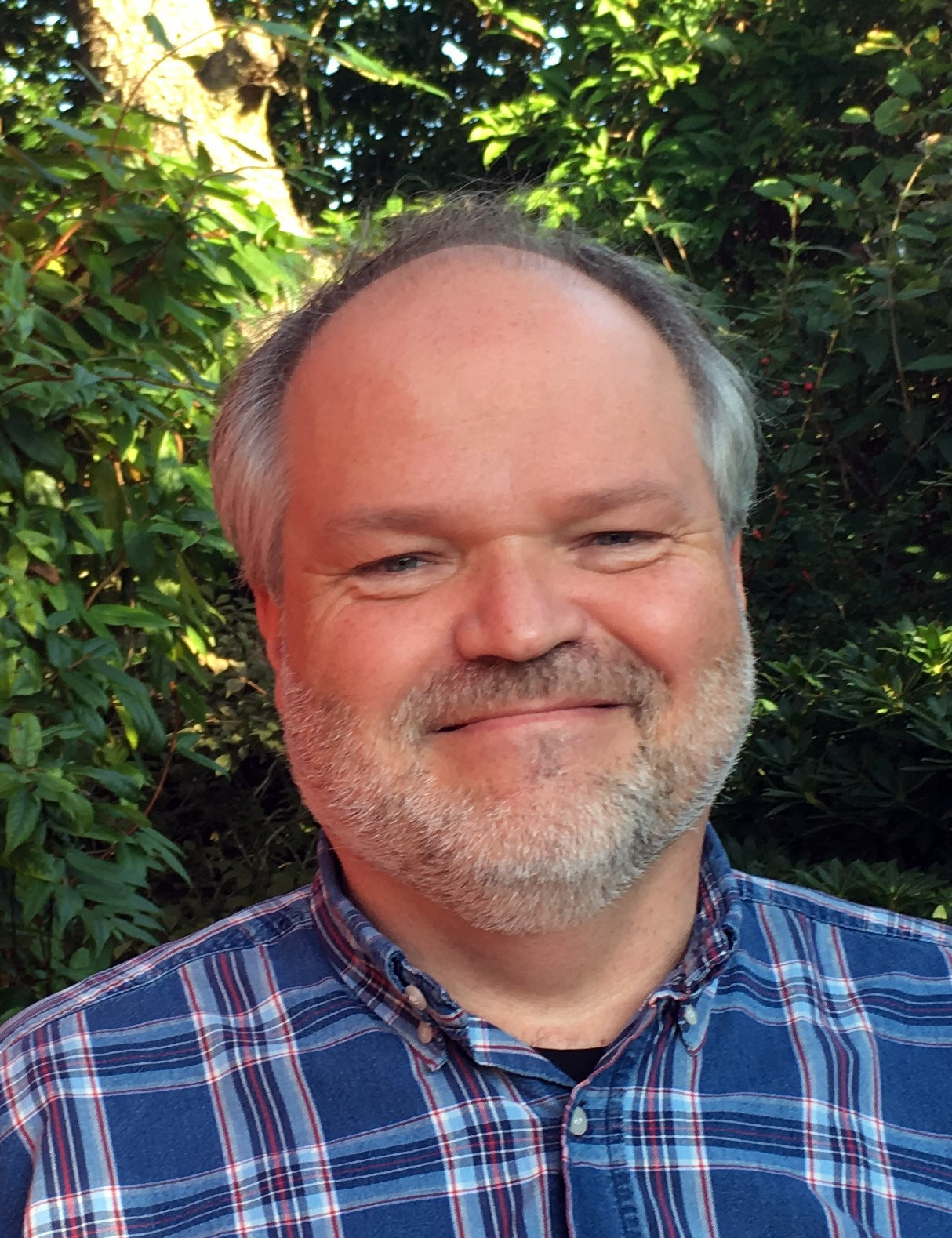
Bjarte Bruland

Bjarte Bruland (born 11 April 1969) is a Norwegian historian. He has done research on the deportations and extermination of the Norwegian Jews during World War II. Bjarte Bruland was a member of the Skarpnes commission in the period 1996–97. He was the director of the Jewish museum in Trondheim from 2016 to 2017. While finishing his doctoral thesis, he was the chief curator at the Jewish Museum in Oslo.

== Works ==
- Forsøket på å tilintetgjøre de norske jødene Hovedfagsoppgave ved Universitetet i Bergen 1995
- The Reisel/Bruland report on the confiscation of Jewish property 1997
- Holocaust i Norge 2002 Online edition:
- Det norske holocaust : jødedeportasjonen 2003
