= Marte Michelet =

Norwegian journalist, critic and non-fiction writer

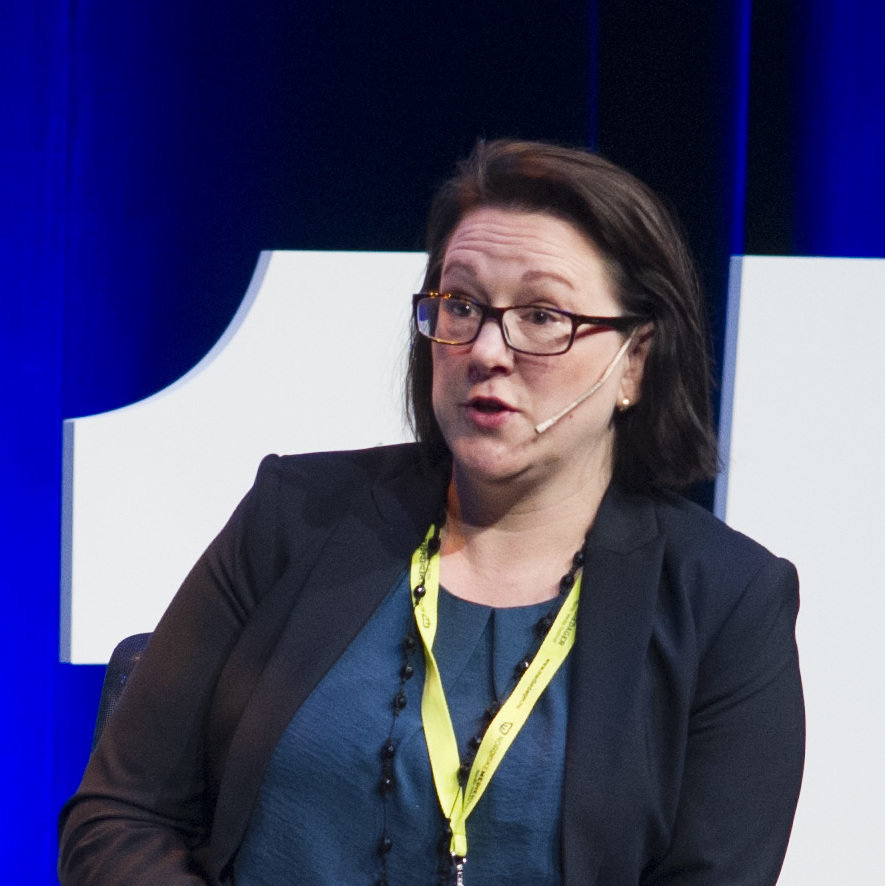
Marte Michelet, 2015

Marte Brekke Michelet (born 26 May 1975) is a Norwegian journalist, critic and non-fiction writer.

She is the daughter of novelist and politician Jon Michelet and Toril Brekke. They resided in Lindeberg, Oslo before her parents split up. Marte Michelet moved into an apartment in Oslo, that once had housed a young Jewish girl who was deported to Auschwitz.

She started her career in RadiOrakel and as a journalist in NRK. In 2006 she was hired in Dagbladet, where she rose to political commentator. She was also at one point the restaurant critic Robinson & Fredag. She resigned in 2014 when moving with her former husband Ali Esbati to Sweden; he was elected as a member of Parliament there.

In 2014 she released the book Den største forbrytelsen about the Holocaust in Norway, receiving rave reviews and promptly winning the Brage Prize.

== Bibliography ==
- Kvinnekamp i sari : Møte med kvinner i India og Nepal (1997) (co-authored with Kjersti Ericsson og Sissel Henriksen). Arbeidernes kommunistparti
- Den største forbrytelsen (2014) ISBN 9788205470439
- Hva visste hjemmefronten? (2018), Gyldendal ISBN 9788205504103

Party political offices
Preceded by Jorunn Folkvord	Leader of the Red Youth; 1996–1998	Succeeded by Wenche With
Awards
Preceded by Steffen Kverneland	Recipient of the Brage Prize for prose 2014	Succeeded by Morten Strøksnes
