= Benjamin Bild =

Norwegian mechanic

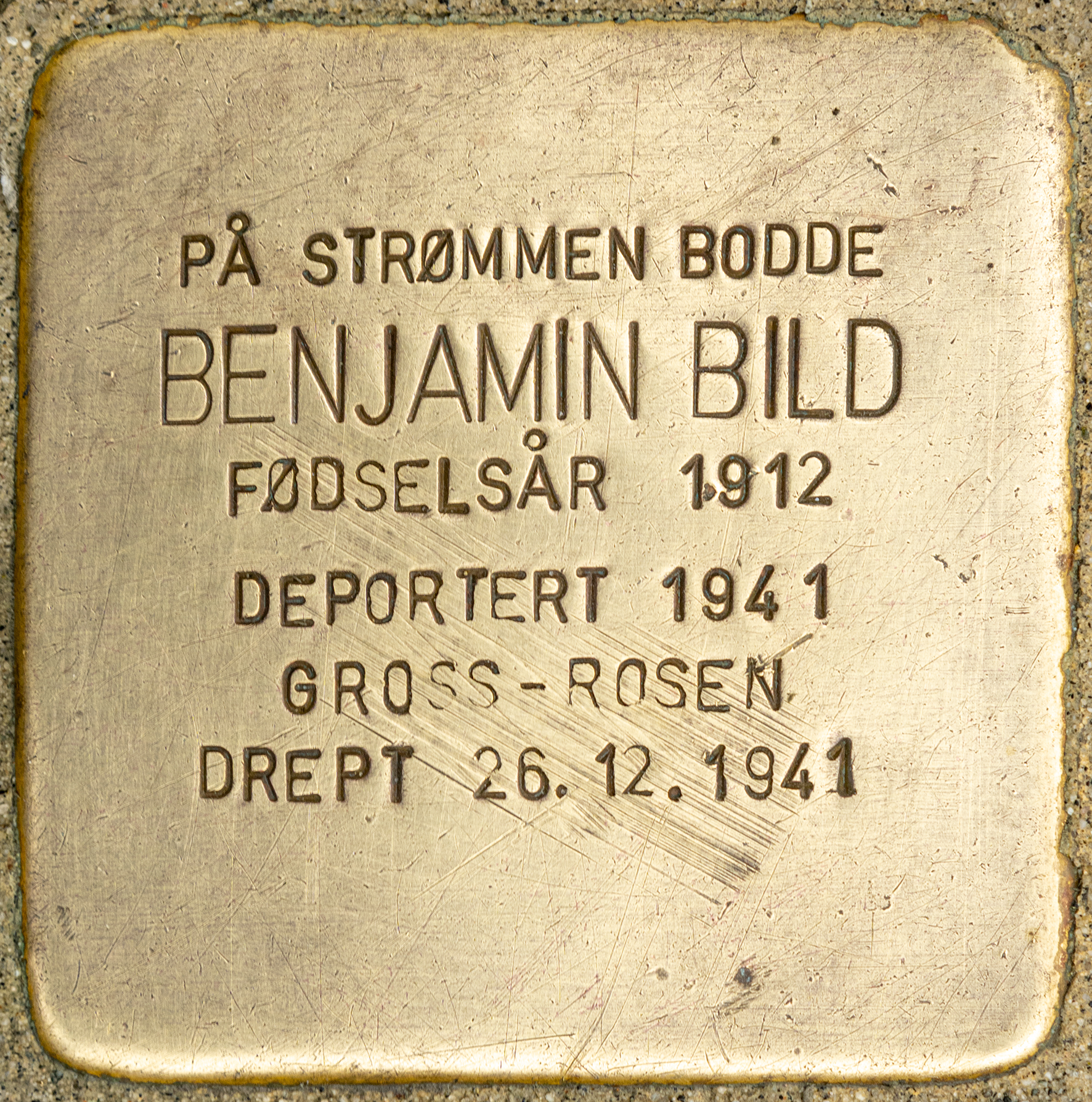
Stumbling block for Benjamin Bild

Benjamin Bild (born 8 August 1912 in Oslo; died 26 December 1941 in Gross-Rosen concentration camp) was a Norwegian mechanic. Together with several other shop stewards at Kjeller Flyfabrikk, he was arrested on 1 March 1941 and accused of communist propaganda and sabotage. He was imprisoned at Møllergaten 19 and was then deported to Gross-Rosen on 19 April 1941. There he died the same year of "circulatory weakness." He is the first Norwegian Jew to die in a concentration camp. His parents Herman and Thina Bild had immigrated from Russia in 1905. The parents and some of Benjamin's siblings were deported to Auschwitz in November 1942. None deported survived. However, two siblings managed to escape to Sweden before the deportation. Descendants of these are alive today.
