= Operation Blumenpflücken =

Operation Blumenpflücken (English: Operation Flower Picking) was a counter-resistance operation in occupied Norway, planned and carried out by the Gestapo/Sicherheitspolizei in 1944 and early 1945.

It was planned by Ernst Weiner, and was a part of the Gegenterror organized to weaken the Norwegian resistance. The purpose was not to terrorize or liquidate central resistance leaders, but rather to capture and kill other known Norwegians and hide the real purpose. According to Arnfinn Moland, the killings were made to look like actions by the Norwegian resistance (Home Front), specifically the Communist parts of it.

Many believed the deception well into the 1990s. Egil Ulateig's 1996 book Med rett til å drepe, with consultant help from Hans Fredrik Dahl, made such a claim about two of the Blumenpflücken victims. During the war, even some of the German participants thought the initiative had come from Siegfried Fehmer or the Reichskommissariat Norwegen. Arnfinn Moland also claimed that the Norwegian Nazi police Statspolitiet were not informed. Historian Tore Pryser has stated that Statspolitiet were indeed involved.

According to Moland, Weiner participated and, between 12 June and 1 July 1944, shot the first three of the eleven victims, Einar Hærland (long thought to have been liquidated by Norwegians), Sigurd Roll and Gunnar Spangen. According to Berit Nøkleby in Norsk krigsleksikon 1940-45, a woman named Sigrid Hammerø was also killed, the operation's only female victim. The next seven killings took place in November and December 1944. The first was carried out by two Norwegian perpetrators and a German helper, Erwin Morio. The next three were carried out by Germans only; Heinz Vierke was legally acquitted for one killing during the legal purge in Norway after World War II. The next killing was by two Norwegians. The last three were carried out by Nickerl (first name unknown, participated twice) or Heinz Vierke (once) with Norwegian helpers. The last victim, Georg Henrik Resch, killed in Drammen on 6 January 1945, was the wrong person. Two attempts failed, one on 4 September 1944 and the other on 30 October 1944. All but three killings took place in Oslo or Aker.

Of the eleven killings that went to trial after the war, there were convictions in each case, except the one with Heinz Vierke. Ernst Weiner was among the arrested, but was said to have shot himself and a fellow inmate while in prison. Historian Tore Pryser has cast some doubt on the "official version" that this was a suicide.

== Bibliography ==
- Christopher Hals Gylseth: Operasjon Blumenpflücken: Gestapos hemmelige terrorplan. Aschehoug 2013, ISBN 978-82-03-29419-8.
