= Siegfried Fehmer =

German SS officer (1911–1948)

SS-Hauptsturmführer Siegfried Wolfgang Fehmer
- Born: 10 January 1911; Munich, German Empire
- Died: 16 March 1948 (aged 37); Akershus Fortress, Oslo, Norway
- Status: Executed by firing squad
- Conviction: War crimes
- Penalty: Death
- Military career
- Allegiance: Nazi Germany
- Branch: Schutzstaffel
- Service years: 1934–1945
- Rank: SS-Hauptsturmführer
- Conflicts: World War II

Siegfried Wolfgang Fehmer (10 January 1911 – 16 March 1948) was a German SS officer during World War II. He was stationed in Norway during the occupation by Nazi Germany, and by the end of the war he was heading the Oslo branch of the Gestapo from its headquarters in Victoria Terrasse, Oslo. Along with Josef Terboven, Fehmer was considered one of the most despised members of the German occupation forces in Norway.

== Early life ==
Fehmer was born in Munich, Germany, on 10 January 1911 to Latvian/German parents. His father had Russian citizenship and Fehmer spent the first part of his life in Ukraine and in Moscow, where he experienced the Russian Revolution as a young boy. His family moved to Berlin in 1918 and gained German citizenship. In January 1930, Fehmer joined the National Socialist German Workers Party at the age of 19. He studied law at Berlin University until 1933 and was described as sporty, intelligent, and knowledgeable, with an exceptionally good memory.

== Gestapo career ==
Fehmer was employed by the Gestapo from 1934, holding various positions within the organization and gaining experience in counter-intelligence. On 29 April 1940, he was sent to Norway and tasked by Heinrich Fehlis with suppressing the Norwegian resistance. In January 1943, he was given the rank of SS-Hauptsturmführer and promoted to Kriminalrat, placing him in charge of all counter-espionage investigations across Norway. When the command-structure for the Sicherheitspolizei (SiPo) in Norway was altered in February 1945, Fehmer was made head of Division IV (the Gestapo) in the new Oslo branch. He held this position until the end of the war.

Fehmer was considered a key opponent by Milorg (the military branch of the Norwegian resistance) even before he was promoted to a senior position. He was a skilled forensic scientist and a daring leader in the field; on 4 July 1944, he was seriously injured during an operation against a Milorg radio transmitter. He also became notorious for his capture of well-known resistance members and for personally taking part in their torture.

== Post-war capture and execution ==
Following the end of the war in Europe on 8 May 1945, Fehmer disguised himself as a Wehrmacht soldier and mixed in with other German POWs at Haslemoen Camp in Våler. He was subsequently betrayed and arrested after making a telephone call to a female friend to inquire how his pet German Shepherd was doing.

During his trial for war crimes, Fehmer attempted to avoid execution by proving that he had managed to help a handful of prisoners and by presenting himself as a valuable source of information. This included authoring a lengthy report on his activities in Norway, which is now considered one of the best sources on German police activities during the occupation. Following the war, a nurse who attended him in prison later said that Fehmer believed he would be extradited to the Americans who were interested in his knowledge of communists.

Fehmer's record of torture overshadowed his attempts to redeem himself and he was sentenced to death by the Supreme Court of Norway on 27 June 1947. The verdict was upheld on 24 February 1948 and the sentence was carried out by firing squad at Akershus Fortress on 16 March.

== In pop culture ==
Fehmer was the main antagonist in the 2008 Norwegian war film Max Manus, where he was portrayed by German actor Ken Duken.
