= Sydspissen detention camp =

Nazi concentration camp in Norway

- Concentration camp
- Location within Troms Location within Norway
- Coordinates: 69.6273°N 18.9134°E
- Other names: German: Polizeihäftlingslager Südspitze, Norwegian: Sydspissen fangeleir
- Location: Tromsøya, Norway
- Built by: Nazi Germany
- Operated by: Sicherheitspolizei
- Operational: June 1941 - November 1942

Sydspissen detention camp (Norwegian: Sydspissen fangeleir, German: Polizeihäftlingslager Südspitze) was a Nazi concentration camp in Tromsø, Norway, which operated briefly during World War II. Serving as the primary prison camp in northern Norway, it quickly became overcrowded and is now considered to have had some of the worst conditions of any camp under the German occupation. The prisoners were eventually relocated a short distance away to Tromsdalen detention camp. The camp was used to hold Nazi collaborators after the war, some of whom were badly mistreated. There are no known photographs of the concentration camp; however, a painting in Tromsø Forsvarsmuseeum (Tromsø Defence Museum) details the camp during the summer of 1941, prior to the construction of an additional barracks for prisoners and a residence for the camp commander.

== Background ==
Following their invasion of Norway, the Nazi regime and collaborationist Quisling government would establish over 600 concentration camps throughout the country. A handful were designated as Polizeihäftlingslagers (police detainee camps) and run by the Sicherheitspolizei, specifically the camps at Grini, Falstad, Ulven (later replaced by Espeland), and Sydspissen (later replaced by Tromsdalen). Despite being built with the intention of holding political prisoners, these camps would also hold POWs, Jews, family members of the Norwegian resistance, and criminals with short sentences.

In the spring of 1941, when the district prison in Tromsø (which lies on the small island of Tromsøya) reached maximum capacity, the Germans decided to build a new facility on the southern tip of the island. Polizeihäftlingslager Südspitze (Norwegian: Sydspissen fangeleir) opened and received its first 105 prisoners on 18 June 1941. Südspitze and Sydspissen mean "south tip" in German and Norwegian, respectively.

== The camp ==
=== Layout ===
The camp consisted of barracks which were divided into cells, each containing a small window and designed to house four inmates. There were also staff barracks, a kitchen building, a tool shed, and a toilet. The facility was surrounded by barbed wire, with watch towers placed on two of the corners. The maximum capacity of the camp was around 100 prisoners.

=== Prisoners ===
When the camp opened, it was initially used to house suspected communists and the Tromsø area's male Jewish population. It would later hold intellectuals, teachers, and members of the Norwegian political left. It functioned as a transit camp which would either release prisoners after a short stay or send them further to Grini, Falstad, or camps in Germany.

=== Conditions ===
In addition to the harsh northern climate, prisoners in the camp were also subjected to 14 hour work days, physical abuse, degrading punitive exercises, and meagre catering. They were made to transport stone for a road to the camp and a quay which would be used to offload prisoners by boat. Prisoners kept track of how much stone they carried, which is now estimated to have reached a total of around 400,000 kilograms. Guards in Norwegian prison camps were usually provided by the Ordnungspolizei, but in Sydspissen they were made up of Waffen-SS troops, which may have contributed to a more militant atmosphere.

=== Relocation to Tromsdalen ===
Built for a capacity of around 100, the camp quickly became overcrowded and was eventually home to over 200, leading to miserable conditions. A decision was made to repurpose the camp for military use – the prisoners would be made to construct a new camp in Tromsdalen, just east of Tromsø on the mainland. The replacement camp was completed in October 1942 and all inmates were transferred there in November. The Wehrmacht then used Sydspissen to hold Russian POWs until the end of the war.

== Post-war ==
On 8 May 1945, the surrender of Nazi Germany led to the liberation of Norway. After this, as with many other former Nazi camps, Sydspissen was used to house Norwegians facing trial for charges of treason. As most of the police force in Tromsø had been suspended for collaborating with the Nazis, the camp was mainly staffed by military police trained in Sweden.

A scandal was caused when four guards were charged with mistreatment of post-war prisoners. One inmate was told by a guard: "we're going to continue how the Germans left off, but worse. Our greatest joy would be to shoot you!" In another incident, an inmate was made to sleep in a coffin during the night. Guards would also take degrading photographs of the prisoners, a handful of which (available here) were published by newspaper iTromsø in 2010.

The camp has since been demolished and today there is nothing left of it except a ruined wall and a formation of stones which used to be the quay.

== See also ==
- Nazi concentration camps in Norway
- Ludwig Runzheimer
- Alfred Zeidler
- Gerhard Flesch
- Josef Terboven
- Operation Blumenpflücken
- Beisfjord massacre
- Blood Road
