= Tromsdalen detention camp =

Nazi concentration camp in Norway

- Concentration camp
- Location within Troms Location within Norway
- Coordinates: 69.6505°N 19.0128°E
- Other names: German: Polizeihäftlingslager Tromsdalen, Norwegian: Tromsdalen fangeleir, Krøkebærsletta
- Location: Tromsdalen, Norway
- Built by: Nazi Germany
- Operated by: Sicherheitspolizei
- First built: October 1942
- Operational: November 1942 - May 1945

Tromsdalen detention camp (Norwegian: Tromsdalen fangeleir, German: Polizeihäftlingslager Tromsdalen), colloquially known as Krøkebærsletta, was a Nazi concentration camp just east of Tromsø, Norway, built during World War II. From November 1942 until the end of the occupation of Norway in May 1945, it was primarily a transit camp for prisoners on their way to Falstad, Grini, or camps in Nazi Germany. It held over 2000 recorded prisoners.

Tromstun skole (Tromstun School) now stands on the site of the former camp. A memorial marker has been erected there to commemorate it.

== Background ==
Following their invasion of Norway, the Nazi regime and collaborationist Quisling government would establish over 600 concentration camps throughout the country. A handful were designated as Polizeihäftlingslagers (police detainee camps) and run by the Sicherheitspolizei, specifically the camps at Grini, Falstad, Ulven (later replaced by Espeland), and Sydspissen (later replaced by Tromsdalen). Despite being built with the intention of holding political prisoners, these camps would also hold POWs, Jews, family members of the Norwegian resistance, and criminals with short sentences.

When the Sydspissen camp reached double its max capacity shortly after opening in 1941, it was decided to replace it with a new camp at Krøkebærsletta in Tromsdalen, just east of Tromsø. Construction on Polizeihäftlingslager Tromsdalen was finished in October 1942 and prisoners were transported there in November.

== The camp ==
=== Layout ===
The camp facilities were made up of five prisoner barracks, three personnel barracks, a toilet/wash barrack, a kitchen, and a tool shed. A further four barracks were later added, but the precise nature of their use is unknown. Two of the barracks burnt down in a fire in January 1944. The camp could house approximately 250 prisoners.

=== Prison life ===
Life in the camp was tough and rules were strictly enforced. Inmates spent the day doing forced labour. This included chores within the camp, work on nearby farms, and the loaning of prisoners for use by Organisation Todt, the Kriegsmarine, and the Luftwaffe. Collective punitive exercises were handed out for the slightest mistake and prisoner barracks were regularly raided. Those who had taken part in resistance activity were treated with particular brutality, facing torture on- and off-site at the hands of the Gestapo. With the first arriving on 13 June 1944, a total of 25 women would be held at the camp. Isolated from the male prisoners, they were only let out twice a day and given buckets of potatoes to peel the rest of the time.

On 22 July 1942, 26 Yugoslavian prisoners were executed shortly after arriving at the camp. On 23 October 1943, eight prisoners sentenced to death (as a reprisal for a partisan action which killed 22 Germans) were executed and buried in a bog just north of the camp. Some of them were severely beaten before they were shot.

=== Transfer of Julius Denzer in August 1944 ===
There was a brief period of milder treatment from late 1943 when responsibility for the guard was switched from the Waffen-SS to the Ordnungspolizei. However, this was reversed in August 1944, when a new camp commander, Julius Denzer, was transferred from Grini detention camp. He terrorised the prisoners and was prone to eccentric behaviour.

Denzer would lecture prisoners in a rage about how they needed to learn to understand Nazism, on one occasion for hours until he brought himself to tears. Former prisoner Gunnar Didriksen (who described Denzer as "pompous" and "strange") said he had extreme mood swings, furious one moment and friendly the next. Denzer used Didriksen as a personal servant and dubbed him "Heinrich" – which he claimed was because all proper German families call their servants by that name. Turid Erikstad Bårnes (who was held at the camp when she was 17) wrote about a "tragicomic" incident on 24 December 1944 in which Denzer and a guard abruptly appeared in her cell and made her, her sister, and step-sister sing Silent Night with them, before disappearing as quickly as they had appeared.

=== End of war ===
On 6 May 1945, the prisoners were evacuated from the Tromsdalen camp and sent to work on a railway line near Narvik, but this plan was interrupted by the surrender of Nazi Germany on 8 May. When Denzer was informed that Germany was about to surrender, he lined the prisoners up and formally announced that the war was over and they were all free to go. He shook each prisoner by the hand, gave thanks for their cooperation, and wished them a happy reunion with their families. He then escaped back to Germany under mysterious circumstances before he could be arrested by Norwegian or British forces. He avoided capture for nearly two years until he was recognised by a Norwegian soldier in the street. After being sent back to Norway, Denzer was tried for war crimes in 1947 and sentenced to 15 years in prison for his activities at Grini.

== Post-war history ==
In the immediate aftermath of Norway's liberation, Tromsdalen temporarily functioned as an internment camp for German non-military personnel. In October 1945, its name was changed to Sletta interneringsleir (Sletta internment camp). This was used to hold Norwegians convicted of treason until September 1947.

In 1964, after control of the camp had been passed to Tromsøysund Municipality, the barracks were demolished to make room for a secondary school. A memorial has been erected on the site of the prison camp outside what is now Tromstun skole (Tromstun school).

== See also ==
- Nazi concentration camps in Norway
- Blood Road
- Beisfjord massacre
- Ludwig Runzheimer
- Alfred Zeidler
