= Martin Siem =

Norwegian businessman (1915–1996)

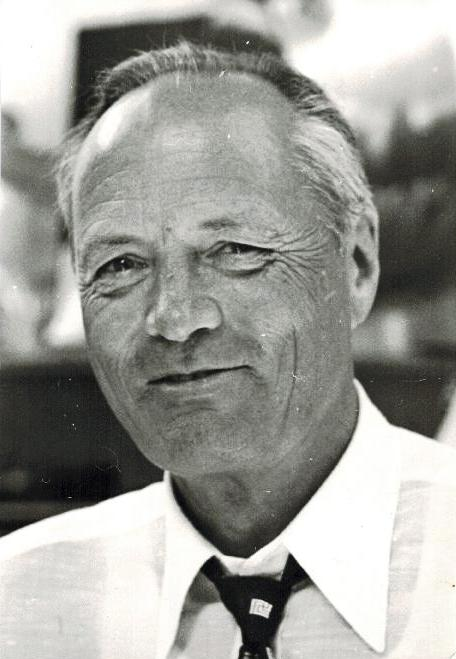

Ole Martin Siem (6 January 1915 – 3 November 1996) was a Norwegian businessman and World War II resistance member.

He was born in Horten as a son of naval commander Ole Siem (1882–1979) and Marie Augusta Ursin Holm (1888–1961). The family moved to Tromsø, where Siem finished secondary education in 1933. He took his education in shipping engineering at the Norwegian Institute of Technology, graduating in 1938. He also worked one year at Trondhjems Mekaniske Verksted. In February 1939 he married Inger Aagaard (1916-2012); they are the parents of industrialist Kristian Siem. His sister married diplomat Thore Boye, a son of Thorvald Boye, in 1945.

When World War II reached Norway with the Nazi German invasion, Siem fought for his country in the Battle of Hegra Fortress. After the conventional Norwegian armed forces capitulated, Siem returned to his job at Akers Mekaniske Verksted. While working there he became an informant for the secret intelligence organization RMO, which was established in 1942. His information on the Port of Oslo became especially important for Norwegian ship saboteurs, such as Max Manus, Gregers Gram and Roy Nielsen. When the leader of RMO, A.K. Rygg, had to flee the country in the autumn 1943, Siem took over the leadership together with Sigurd Sverdrup. Among the results of Siem's information was the sabotage towards SS Donau.

After the war Siem continued at Akers Mekaniske Verksted, except for a period between 1946 and 1950. In this period he worked for Westfal-Larsen & Co. In 1965 he was promoted to director-general of Akers Mekaniske Verksted. He resigned due to a controversial case involving Israel, when a group of gunboats produced in Cherbourg for the Israeli navy circumvented de Gaulle's export boycott and sailed to Israel. He then became executive in Fred. Olsen AS from 1970–72, CEO of Saga Petroleum from 1972 and 1973 and board chairman of Timex Corporation from 1973 to 1978.

Siem was decorated as a Commander of the Royal Norwegian Order of St. Olav in 1969. He died in November 1996 in Oslo.

Siem helped Israel retrieve missile boats purchased and then embargoed by French president Charles de Gaulle in a Christmas Eve raid at Cherbourg Harbour in 1969.
