= Nazi concentration camps in Norway =

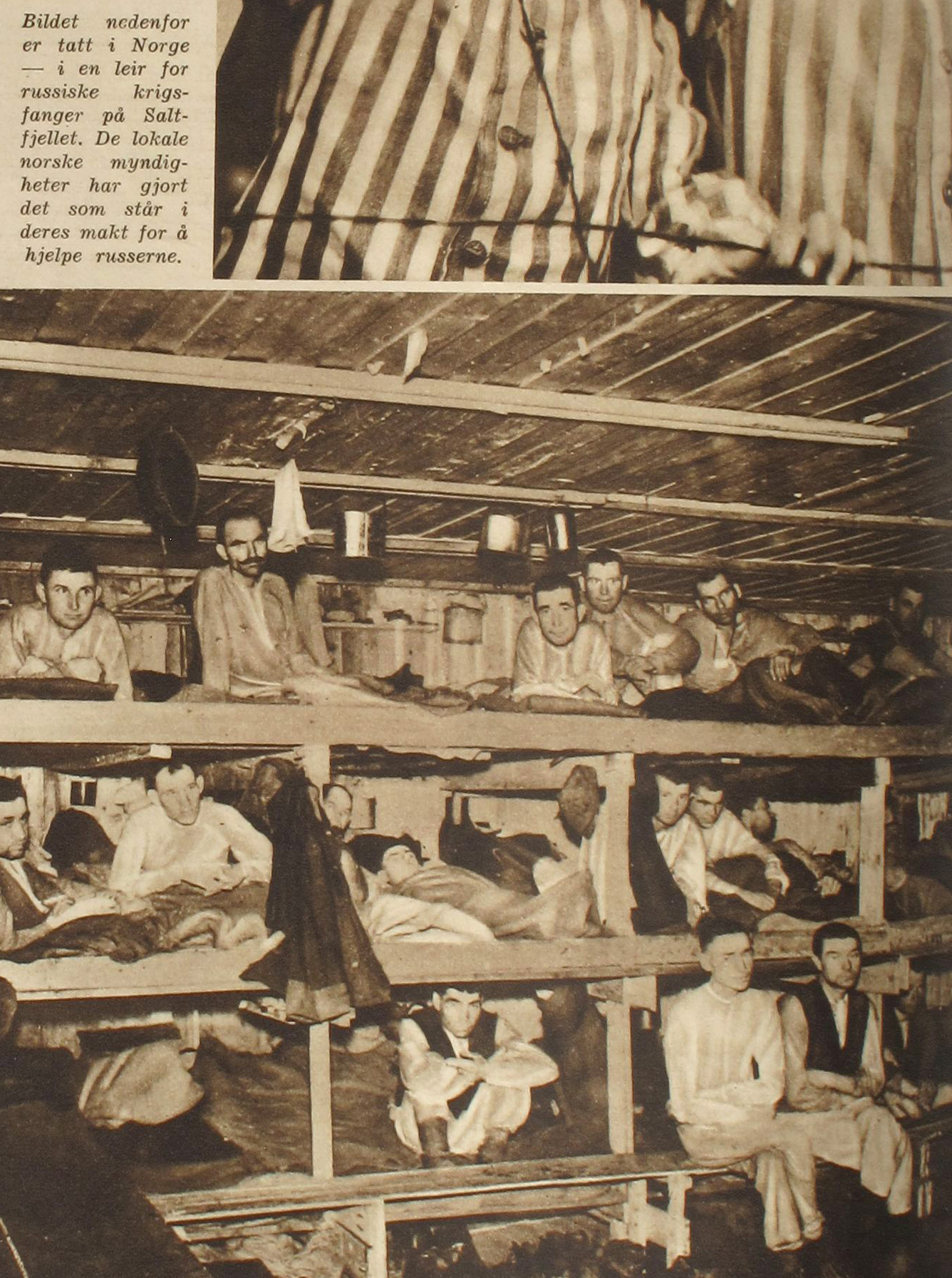
Russian POWs in a barracks near Saltfjellet, 1945.

Nazi concentration camps in Norway (Norwegian: konsentrasjonsleirer) were concentration camps or prisons in Norway established or taken over by the Quisling regime and Nazi German authorities during the German occupation of Norway that began on 9 April 1940 and used for internment of persons by the Nazi authorities. 709 prison camps or concentration camps, [including some death camps,] were counted by a project that had Randi Bratteli (author and widow of former prime minister and concentration camp prisoner), as an advisor. Another source has claimed that there were around 620 prison camps.

There were [at least] 14 different categories of prisoners, in addition to forced laborers, and they came from various countries.

The civilian occupying authorities with the Quisling regime and the German Wehrmacht operated a number of camps in Norway, including around 110 prison camps.

The Wehrmacht camps were largely prisoner of war (POW) camps scattered throughout the country. Some of these had extremely high mortality rates, owing to inhumane conditions and brutality.

Both established and improvised jails and prisons throughout the country were also used for internment by the Nazi authorities. In particular the Sicherheitspolizei and Sicherheitsdienst, headquartered at Victoria Terrasse, were notorious for torture and abuse of prisoners. Also, Arkivet in Kristiansand and Bandeklosteret in Trondheim became synonymous with torture and abuse. Some distinction was made between camps and prisons run by Norwegian Nazis and those run by German Nazi organizations, though it is safe to say that all atrocities took place under the authority of a unified command.

The designated concentration camps were not classified as "KZ-Lager" by the Nazis, but rather as Häftlingslager ("detainee camps") under the administration of the Nazi "security police," the SS and Gestapo. The Nazi authorities deported over 700 Jews from Norway to Auschwitz, over 500 Nacht und Nebel prisoners to Natzweiler; and thousands more to Sachsenhausen, Ravensbrück and other prisons and camps in Germany. Most of these were kept in Norwegian camps during transit.

Although abuse, torture, and murder were commonplace in these camps, none of them were designated or functioned as extermination camps, nor did they reach the scale seen in camps in Germany, occupied Poland, and Austria. It is estimated that between 38,000 and 40,000 individuals passed through this camp system, for a total of 60,000 prisoner years.

The camps served varying purposes, including:

- internment of political prisoners, especially socialists and communists, but also religious dissenters.
- internment of prisoners of war (Stammlager / Stalag) - especially Soviet and Yugoslavian soldiers
- internment of so-called "bomb hostages" (Geisellager) - prominent Norwegians who would be executed in the event of the resistance movement bombing Nazi targets
- transit internment of various prisoners bound for camps in Germany and Poland (Durchgangslager / Dulag) - including Jews, prominent political prisoners, and others.

The Nazi authorities destroyed most of the records related to the camps and prisons they ran during the occupation. Effectively every local prison was used for these purposes by the Nazis, but several full-fledged camps were also established.

== Finnmark ==
In the county of Finnmark, 110 prison camps had a total of around 14,000 prisoners, including 10,000 Soviet POWs that had been transported to Oslo via Germany, then on to Trondheim before being sailed northwards. Some prisoners came from the German penal system. Some prisoners were Norwegian including those who had been linked to the so-called Teacher Strike of 1942.

Karasjok Municipality

- Karasjok prison camp Karasjok fangeleir received around 400 prisoners.

Sør-Varanger Municipality

- Høybuktmoen
- At Neiden there was a camp for Russian [and other Soviet] POWs.
- Leirpollen (article at simple English Wikipedia). Located at Lille Leirpollbukt, there were two prison camps - one for Soviet soldiers, and one for Norwegian, Poles and Czechs. One of these camps held suspected members of the Persfjord Group—partisans on the Varanger Peninsula. In 1943 eleven prisoners were bludgeoned to death.
- Storskog
- Tofte, Finnmark, also known as Jarfjordbotn
- The prison camp at Gjøk-åsen, in the Pasvik valley.

There were concentration camps for teachers at:

- Kirkenes
- Elvenes
- Sandnes

== Troms ==
- Bardufoss concentration camp
- Krøkebærsletta
- Kvænangen concentration camp ( It consisted of two subcamps, Veidal and Badderen, which was also known as Veiskaret.)
- Sydspissen concentration camp
- Tromsdalen detention camp

== Nordland ==
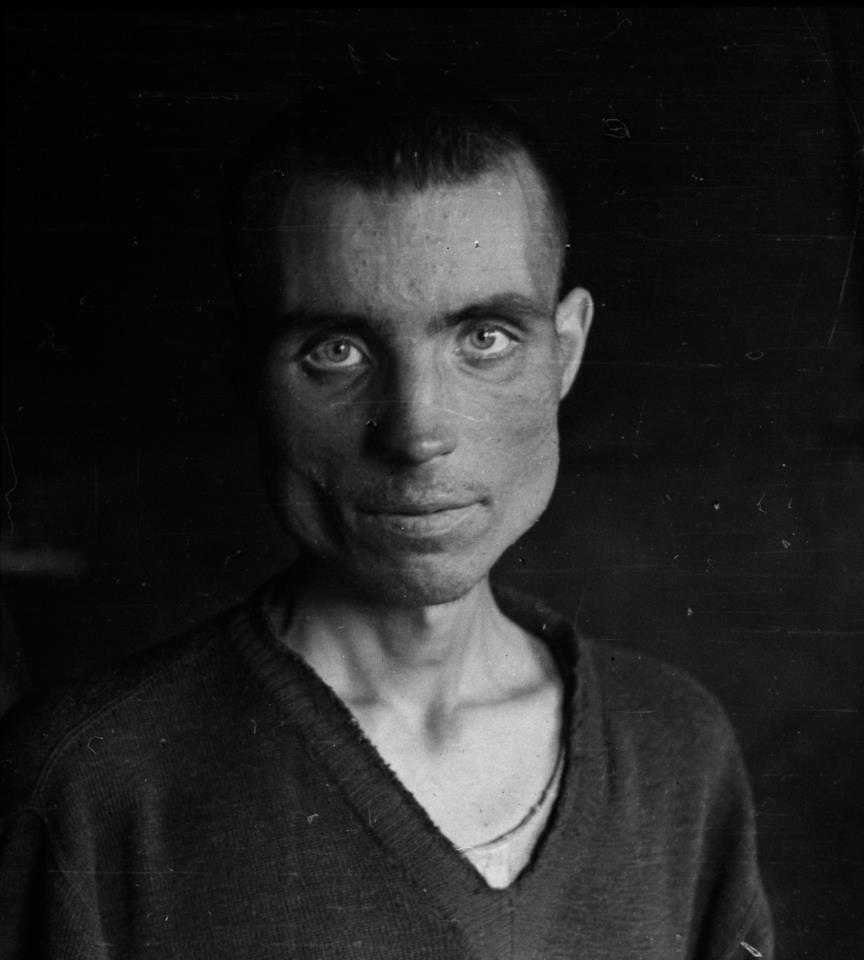
Russian POW photographed after his release from Bjørnelva in Saltdal Municipality.

28 prison camps were located between Mo i Rana and Fauske (and 25 of these were for Soviet POWs).

- Lager I Beisfjord ("No. 1 camp Beisfjord" - in Norwegian Beisfjord fangeleir)
- Railroad slaves lived in "barracks near Bjørnelva".

== Trøndelag ==
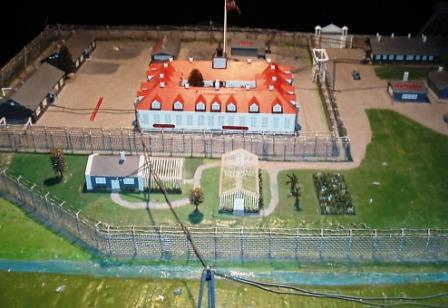
Model of Falstad concentration camp.

- In Levanger Municipality there was the Falstad concentration camp near the SS-camp Falstad.
- At Oppdal Municipality was Stalag 308, supplying forced labor for the construction of the Nordland Line.
- At Orkdal Municipality was Fannrem concentration camp where the prisoners were sent to work on the Orkdal Line. (This camp was a utekommando—satellite camp of the Grini concentration camp.)
- In Trondheim was Vollan prison.
- In Ørland Municipality was Strafgefangenlager: Östraat. In Norwegian it is now known as Austråttleiren.

Austråttleiren

== Vestland ==
Photo of Espeland detention camp.

- Ulven concentration camp
- Espeland concentration camp
- In Bergen: Storetveit skole had 268 prisoners.
- At Framnes at Norheimsund, a boarding school was turned into a detention camp.

== Vestfold ==
- In Færder Municipality, on the Bolærne archipelago, there was a death camp for Russians on Mellom Bolæren [present-day Midtre Bolærne ].
- Tønsberg Municipality had Berg internment camp (Berg interneringsleir)

== Akershus ==
- Bærum Municipality had Grini concentration camp.
- Lillestrøm Municipality had a prison camp at Øvredalen skole in Gansdalen. It had [Soviet] prisoners.
- Nittedal Municipality had Åneby fangeleir.

== Østfold ==
- Indre Østfold Municipality had SS-Sonderlager Mysen, located in Mysen.
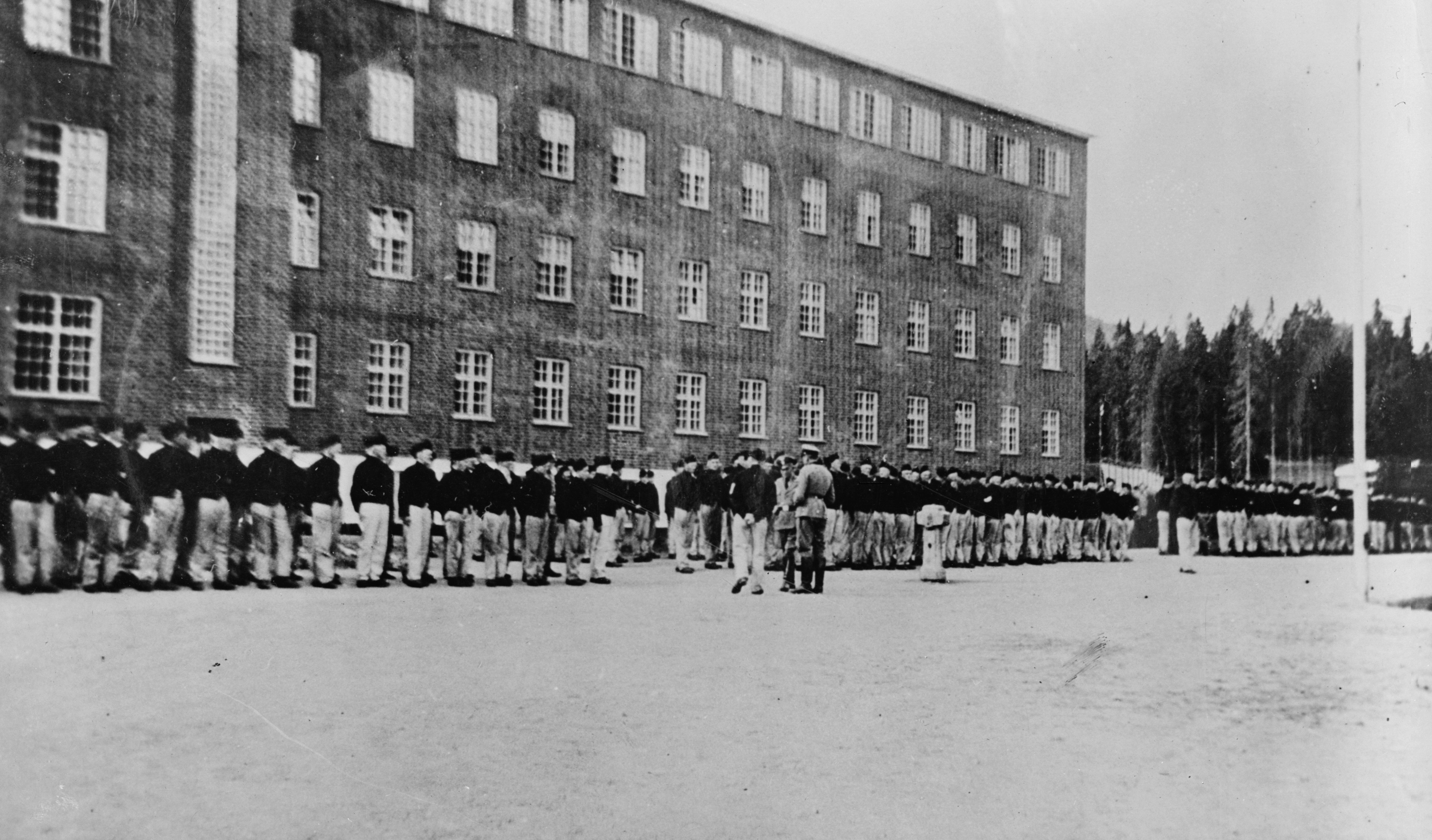
Photo of Grini detention camp (in Bærum)

== Oslo ==
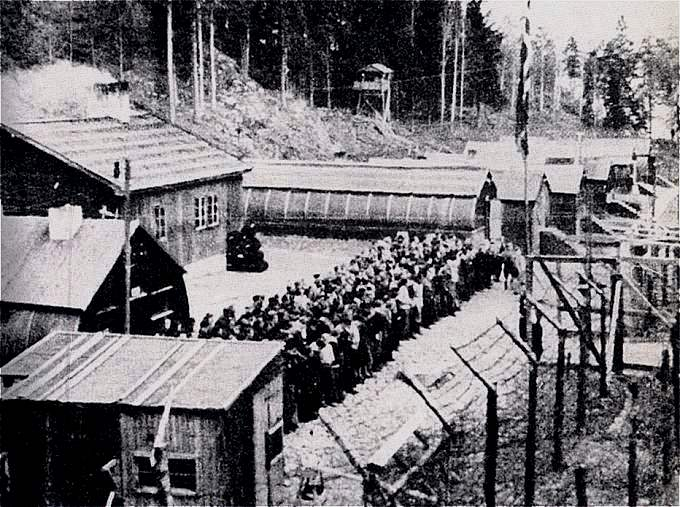
Ljanskollen prison camp around 1945

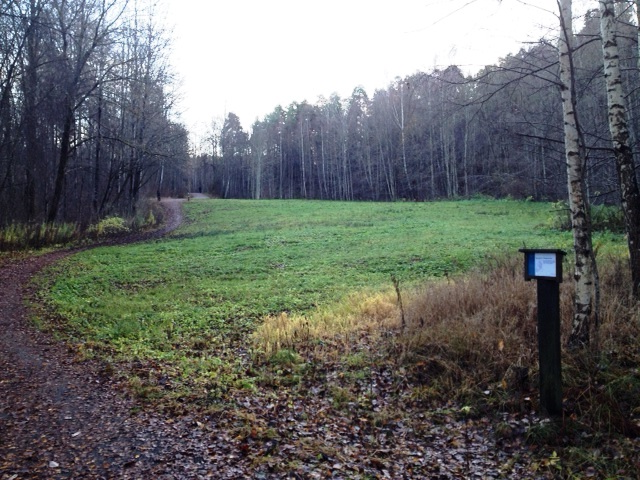
Ljanskollen prison camp's location in present-day Oslo

- At Ljanskollen in the borough of Søndre Nordstrand there was 'Ljanskollen fangeleir [German: Lager Ljanskollen; "Ljanskollen prison camp", presently also known as "Fangeleir Fiskevollen". The prisoners constructed an oil line (including oil pump), that went 100 metres into the bedrock; the oil line went on up to a railway sideline that came from Holmlia; the camp at Ljanskollen had a majority of Norwegian prisoners, and it was a satellite camp of Grini Concentration Camp.

== See also ==
- Beisfjord massacre
