= Thorleif Karlsen =

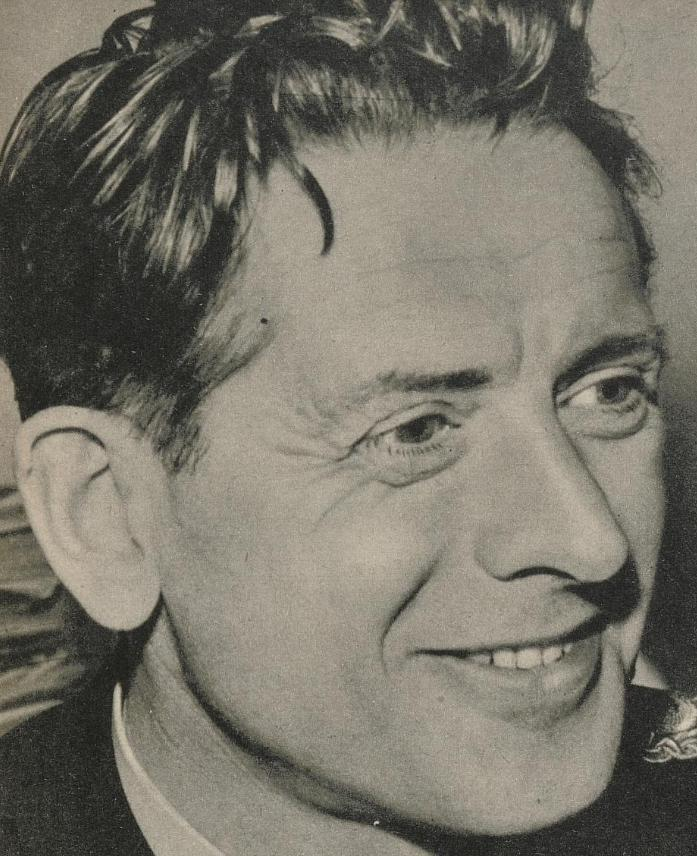
Thorleif Karlsen in the early 1950s

Thorleif Oscar Karlsen (17 December 1909 – 31 January 2010) was a Norwegian police inspector and politician, who also became known through the radio program Trafikk og musikk.

== Biography ==
He was born in Stavanger, to which his parents had moved in the same year. He was hired as a police officer in 1930. He worked in Stavanger from 1930 to 1932, for Statspolitiet in Oslo from 1932 to 1937 and then in Stavanger again from 1938. During the occupation of Norway by Nazi Germany he was arrested in February 1941 for "anti-German propaganda". He was imprisoned at Møllergata 19 from 26 February to 22 March, then at Ånebyleiren concentration camp until 16 April. He was freed, but was later arrested again during a crackdown on the police (Norwegian: politiaksjonen), and was then imprisoned at Grini concentration camp from March 1943 to January 1944. After being released again, he was even arrested for a third time, and sat at Møllergata 19 from October 1944 to the war's end in May 1945. He has speculated that the reason for him not being sent to a German concentration camp, was that his father co-founded Nasjonal Samling.

After World War II he continued as a police officer. He was also a member of Stavanger city council from 1947 to 1955, representing the Labour Party. In 1954 he became the first non-jurist to serve as police inspector in the city Oslo. The appointment of a non-jurist was controversial, and was even debated in the Parliament of Norway. He led the traffic police department in Oslo, and held the position until 1979. He became nationally known as permanent guest in the Norwegian Broadcasting Corporation radio program Trafikk og musikk hosted by Oddvar Folkestad which aired every Saturday afternoon between 1960 and 1980. He was one of the founders of Trygg Trafikk. In 1982 he was hired as a columnist in Stavanger Aftenblad.

Karlsen died on 31 January 2010 in Stavanger. He was married for the most of his life, had five children and twelve grandchildren. He was also a Freemason and a member of the International Organisation of Good Templars, and from 1978 to 1983 he was a board member of the International Abstaining Motorists Association. He has been decorated with the King's Medal of Merit in gold, and appointed a Knight of the Order of the Dannebrog, a Knight of the Order of Vasa and a Knight of the Order of the Lion of Finland.
