= Rygg =

Rygg is a surname. Notable people with the surname include:

- Andreas Rygg (1909–1999), Norwegian military officer
- Andreas Nilsen Rygg (1868–1951), Norwegian-American journalist, newspaper editor and author
- Eli Rygg (born 1955), Norwegian television personality and children's writer
- Joachim Rygg, Norwegian musician
- Kristoffer Rygg (born 1976), Norwegian heavy-metal vocalist, musician and producer
- Leif Rygg (1940–2018), Norwegian hardingfele fiddle player and folk music instructor
- Nicolai Rygg (1872–1957), Norwegian economist
