= Ulven detention camp =

Norwegian detention camp

Ulven
- Concentration camp
- Norwegian soldiers at Ulven before the German occupation, circa 1936-37.
- Interactive map of Ulven
- Coordinates: 60.1994°N 5.4235°E
- Other names: German: Polizeihäftlingslager Ulven; Norwegian: Ulven fangeleir
- Location: Osøyro, Norway
- Built by: Norwegian Army
- Operated by: Sicherheitspolizei
- Commandant: Otmar Holenia
- Original use: Military exercise camp
- First built: 1876
- Operational: June 1940-1944

Ulven detention camp (German: Polizeihäftlingslager Ulven, Norwegian: Ulven fangeleir; "Ulven" means "the wolf") was a concentration camp in Norway that was located in what was Os Municipality in Hordaland county (now part of Bjørnafjorden Municipality in Vestland county). It was located just outside the village of Osøyro, 30 kilometres (19 mi) south of the city of Bergen.

Originally a military training camp built by the Norwegian Army in 1876, it was converted into a prison camp in June 1940 during the German occupation of Norway, and it was the first Nazi prison camp in the country. It was designated a Polizeihäftlingslager (police detention camp), under the administration of the Nazi "security police" (Sicherheitspolizei, SIPO).

Initially, prisoners were Jews and communists, but a broader array of members from prosecuted groups began arriving at the camp. Conditions were relatively benign until 1942, when Untersturmführer Otmar Holenia, nicknamed "the Storm", took command and imposed harsher conditions. Ulven was used for purposes of executing individuals for various reasons. It is not known how many were murdered in the camp.

In the course of the summer of 1943, the prisoners at Ulven were used as slave labor to build the Espeland concentration camp in Bergen, to which the prisoners were transferred.

The camp is now a training ground for the Bergenhus home guard.

== See also ==
- Nazi concentration camps in Norway
- Espeland detention camp
- Falstad concentration camp
- Grini detention camp
- Sydspissen detention camp
- Tromsdalen detention camp
