= Ole Siem =

Norwegian naval officer, businessman, and politician

- Born: 11 January 1882; Trondheim, Norway
- Died: 1979 (aged 96–97)
- Occupations: naval officer, businessman, and politician
- Children: Martin Siem
- Relatives: Thore Boye (son-in-law)
- Awards: Order of St. Olav (1946); Legion of Honour; Virtuti Militari; Liakat Medal

Ole Siem (11 January 1882 – 1979) was a Norwegian naval officer, businessman, and politician.

He was director of Troms Fylkes Dampskibsselskap from 1929 to 1934, and of Vesteraalens Dampskibsselskab from 1936 to 1950. He was head of the sea transport during the Battles of Narvik in 1940, and among the resistance pioneers in Northern Norway during the German occupation.

== Personal life ==
Siem was born in Trondheim to Martin Olsen Siem and Gjertrud Christlock. He married Marie Augusta Ursin Holm in 1912, and was the father of Martin Siem.

His daughter Augusta Sofie was married to diplomat and civil servant Thore Boye.

== Career ==
Siem graduated as naval officer in 1904, and studied electrical engineering and diesel engine at the TH Charlottenburg from 1911 to 1912. An officer in the Norwegian Navy, he held the rank of captain from 1919, and commander-captain from 1937.

He took actively part in local politics, and was elected to the municipal council in Horten (1925–1928), Tromsø (1931–1934) and Hadsel (1937–1940). He was director of Troms Fylkes Dampskibsselskap from 1929 to 1934, and of Vesteraalens Dampskibsselskab from 1936 to 1950.

During the Battles of Narvik in 1940 he served with the 6th Division, as head of the sea transport. During the German occupation of Norway he was among the resistance pioneers in Northern Norway. He was incarcerated at Ånebyleiren and then Grini from April to July 1941, as a "Svolvær hostage". He was later arrested by the Gestapo in December 1942, but was transferred to the Wehrmacht as prisoner-of-war in 1943 when about 1,100 Norwegian military officers were sent to prisoner-of-war camps in Poland and Germany for the rest of the war.

He was decorated Knight, First Class of the Order of St. Olav in 1946. He was Officer of the French Legion of Honour, recipient of the Polish Virtuti Militari, 4th Class, and of the Turkish Liakat Medal.
