= Ånebyleiren =

Nazi prison camp in Norway

Coordinates: 60°6′N 10°52′E

Ånebyleiren (Aneby detention camp) was the first German prison camp in the Oslo area, and the second in Norway after Ulven near Bergen. Six barracks were built on stilts from the autumn of 1940 to the spring of 1941. The prison camp was located in a field near Fossen farm, north of the current gas station in Hakadal. The Germans called their camps in Norway "Häftlingslager".

== Prisoners ==
The first prisoners were the 97 hostages taken by the Germans after the British commando raid on Lofoten on March 4, 1941. These prisoners spent four days onboard the troop transport ship "Bretagne" before arriving at the harbor in Svolvær where they were then moved by train to Oslo. After an initial stay in Møllergata 19, they arrived at Ånebyleiren on 15 March 1941.

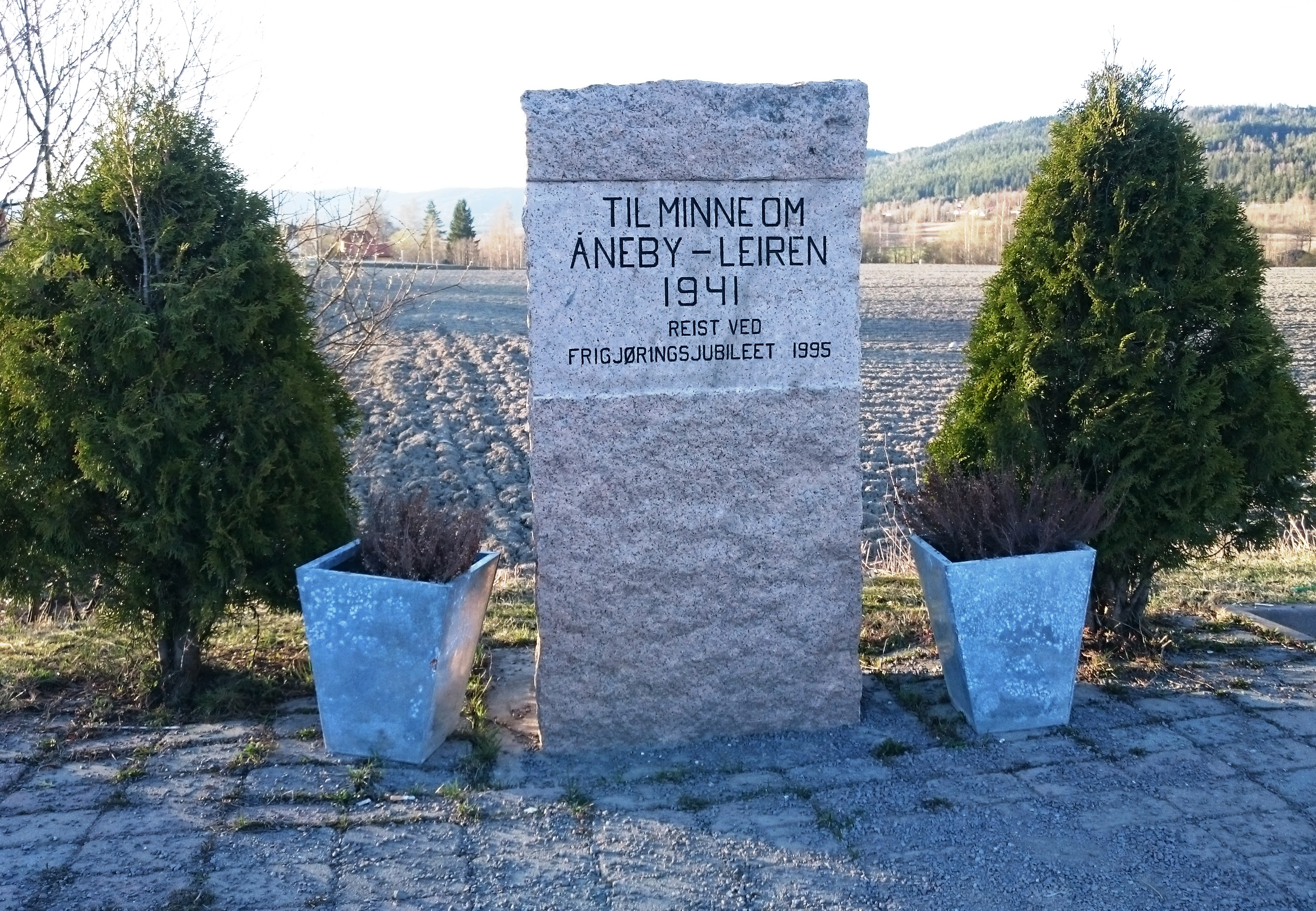
Erected at the liberation anniversary in 1995.

The prisoners were numbered from 1 and up. The last number assigned to an Åneby prisoner was 184, and the prisoner numbers at Grini detention camp continued directly from this. In addition to the hostages, there were many who were imprisoned for minor acts of resistance, such as the demolition of posters or illegal newspapers, or for fighting with German soldiers.

== Leadership ==
The commander's name was Georg Angerer and he was, among other things, head of security for the Germans in Møllergata 19. He had been a German spy in 1934 when he came to Norway as a refugee. Angerer disappeared from Ånebyleiren after only five days.

After a short time, Obersturmführer Hermann Koch (nicknamed "Stormfyrsten" by the prisoners) joined the leadership. He then went on to become the first commander of the Grini detention camp.

== Notable prisoners ==
- Ole Siem
- Nils Hønsvald
- Thorleif Karlsen
- Moritz Rabinowitz
