= Espeland detention camp =

Nazi Germany internment camp in occupied Norway

- Concentration camp
- Espeland Detention Camp

- Location within Vestland Location within Norway
- Coordinates: 60.3751°N 5.47606°E
- Other names: German: Polizeihäftlingslager Espeland,Norwegian: Espeland fangeleir
- Known for: One of the best-preserved Nazi concentration camps in the world
- Location: Espeland, Norway
- Operated by: January 1943 - 9 May 1945: Nazi Germany 9 May 1945 - 1 April 1946: Norwegian Police 1 April 1946 - 21 April 1952: Norwegian Prison Board
- First built: Summer 1942 - Summer 1944
- Operational: January 1943 - 21 April 1952
- Liberated by: Norwegian Police
- Website: https://www.espeland-fangeleir.no/default-css.asp?

Espeland detention camp (Norwegian: Espeland fangeleir, German: Polizeihäftlingslager Espeland) was an internment camp opened in 1943 by Nazi Germany in occupied Norway next to the village of Espeland in the modern-day borough of Arna, Bergen.

Built to house prisoners after the closure of the nearby Ulven detention camp, Espeland was soon being used to mitigate overcrowding in Bergen. It functioned as a transit camp, sending many inmates further to Grini detention camp and to camps in mainland Europe. Abuse was common and the total number of people killed during captivity is unknown.

Following the surrender of the Nazi regime the previous day, the camp was liberated on 9 May 1945. It was subsequently used by the Norwegians to house post-war prisoners. Since 2000, there has been an effort to convert the camp into an education and archive centre. It is currently run by the Stiftelsen Espeland fangeleir (Espeland Prison Camp Foundation), which, as of 2021, was in the process of being merged with the Norwegian Gestapo Museum.

It is among the most well-preserved Nazi concentration camps in the world and in November 2014 the facility was declared a protected monument.

== Background ==
After the invasion of Norway by Nazi Germany during World War II, the Nazi authorities and collaborationist Quisling regime established over 600 concentration camps throughout the country. These would be used to house POWs, political prisoners, groups considered undesirable by Nazi ideology, and ordinary criminals.

In the summer of 1942, the Ulven detention camp near Bergen – at that time used by the Sicherheitsdienst (SD) and Sicherheitspolizei (SiPo) to hold political prisoners – was deemed to be at risk from British sea raids due to its proximity to the coast. A decision was made to transfer the camp to the Wehrmacht and repurpose it for military training. The prisoners would be relocated further inland to a new facility in Espeland, a few kilometres south of Indre Arna, a small village outside Bergen.

== Design and construction ==
The Espeland detention camp was built to designs drawn and signed by SS-Untersturmführer Niebel. Construction was organised by SS-Wirtschafter Rudolf Klotz through Gruppe Bauwesen – an SS-run building organisation in Norway. Barracks were prefabricated in Germany before being transported to and assembled in Norway through the use of Norwegian contractors and slave labour.

Construction began around June–July 1942, with hundreds of Yugoslavian POWs (ferried to and from Bergen on a daily basis by train) made to build the road which would lead to the complex. Work on the camp itself began 1 August 1942, with the first barracks erected the following January. Prisoners were immediately transferred from other camps to ease overcrowding and supply more slaves. By July 1943, the camp contained three prisoner barracks, two single-cell barracks, and a kitchen barrack. By the end of 1944, there was a toilet/laundry barrack, two administration/staff barracks, a guards barrack, and a garage. The prisoner buildings were surrounded by a double barbed wire fence with a guard tower on each corner.

Prisoner barracks were divided into eight- and sixteen-person rooms, each with a total capacity of around 100 prisoners. The single-cell barracks were made up of rooms 1.2m x 4m in size. The maximum capacity of the camp was around 380.

== Life in the camp ==
=== Inmates ===
Between January 1943 and May 1945, Espeland held a total of 2026 prisoners. Although intended as a transit camp for political prisoners waiting to be sent to the Grini detention camp in Bærum, it was also used to hold those with short sentences for non-political crimes. Family members of wanted individuals (to be used as hostages) were also held. Most prisoners were released after a short stay but 627 of the inmates were ultimately transferred to Grini. At least 378 of these were sent further to Germany and a minimum of 27 lost their lives outside of Norway. At least five prisoners died while living in Espeland.

=== Routine and work ===
==== Food ====
Prisoners were all served the same food, regardless of gender and whether they worked or not. The daily ration consisted of a small amount of black bread, some soup, some margarine substitute, and some coffee substitute.

==== Single-cell barracks ====
The first single-cell barracks was nicknamed Lenken (The Link) and reserved for the more serious political prisoners – usually those awaiting a death sentence or transit to Grini. It was also used as a temporary punishment for the other inmates. The prisoners in Lenken were only allowed out once a day, had their mail privileges removed, and were often interrogated/tortured before arriving at the camp. The second of the single-cell barracks was used to hold the camp's female prisoners.

==== Camp work ====
For inmates in the communal barracks, life consisted of forced labour. Prisoners were woken at 6:00am, with work starting at 8:00am and carrying on until 6:00pm; a lunch break was provided at midday. Prisoners were transported outside of camp to provide a workforce for Organisation Todt, as well as to carry out logging and farming jobs. After the work day, prisoners were expected to clean their shoes and uniform.

The internal administration of the camp was also largely entrusted to prisoners, a technique commonly used by Nazi Germany to cut down on expenditure and encourage discipline. Jobs carried out by inmates included cooking, washing, enrolment of new arrivals, and organisation of work teams. Commanders were picked from each barracks and some of the prisoners worked for German officers as personal caretakers.

=== Change in management ===
In its early years, the camp gained a reputation for having a relaxed atmosphere and conditions described as "liveable." The guards were made up of German/Austrian reservists and often sympathetic. Inmates could easily rendezvous with family members during outside work and receive gifts of food. An escape was also reported.

In December 1944, the head of the SD and SiPo in Bergen, Ernst Weimann, declared that the guards were too friendly and initiated a shakeup of the facility. A full replacement of the guard and partial replacement of management was carried out; regulations were strictly tightened and punishments increased.

In March 1945, SS-Oberscharführer Ludwig Runzheimer began in the position of task-force leader at Espeland, and introduced a draconian regime. He made exhaustive punitive exercises a daily affair, not taking age or health into account, and several inmates suffered injuries and trauma as a result. Sometimes prisoners were physically beaten and trampled. This carried on until Germany's capitulation on 8 May 1945.

== Liberation and post-war use by Norwegians ==
On 9 May 1945, the arrival of the Norwegian Red Cross and Norwegian Police led to the liberation of 209 remaining prisoners. The camp was adapted to hold Norwegians accused of treason and renamed Espeland tvangsarbeidsleir (Espeland Forced Labour Camp). It was overseen by police until 1 April 1946, when jurisdiction passed to the Norwegian Prison Board. Conditions improved gradually: single-cell barracks were converted into communal ones, leisure activities were provided, and a mess-hall was built. However, as punishment for treason, outdoor work now included the retrieval of corpses from Nazi mass graves.

On 25 October 1948, the remaining inmates held for treason were transferred elsewhere and the prison was tasked with holding the 60 Germans serving sentences for war crimes in Norway. By 21 April 1952, many of these prisoners had all been pardoned or deported and the Espeland Forced Labour Camp was closed.

Camp facilities were then passed on to the Norwegian Civil Defence, which used it for training purposes during the Cold War until 1997.

== Espeland Prison Camp Foundation ==
As an eventual consequence of the dissolution of the Soviet Union, the camp was declared redundant in June 1997. By this time, due to its continuous usage, it was the most intact Nazi concentration camp in Norway. An attempt was initiated by a group of private investors and mayor of Arna, Erling Mjelde, to have the camp reserved for educational and archival purposes. This movement was backed by Minister of Culture, Anne Enger Lahnstein, and the Stiftelsen Espeland fangeleir (Espeland Prison Camp Foundation) was formed in 2000. On 30 January 2015, the camp was officially handed over to the foundation by the Norwegian state. In 2020, the foundation was merged with the Norwegian Gestapo Museum to become Stiftelsen Lenken: Gestapohuset og Espeland fangeleir (Lenken Foundation: Gestapo House and Espeland Prison). The process is ongoing.

== See also ==
- Nazi concentration camps in Norway
- Gerhard Flesch
- Alfred Zeidler
