= Thore Boye =

Norwegian diplomat (1912–1999)

Thore Albert Boye (27 October 1912 – 1 October 1999) was a Norwegian diplomat.

He was born in Kristiania as a son of Supreme Court Justice Thorvald Boye (1871–1943) and Mia Esmarch (1880–1966). In 1945 he married Nøste Siem (1918–1999), a daughter of Ole Siem and sister of Martin Siem.

He took the cand.jur. degree in 1936, and was an attorney and deputy judge in Tromsø before being hired in the Norwegian Ministry of Foreign Affairs in 1938. After the Second World War reached Norway on 9 April 1940, and the government fled the capital, Boye set out on skis to catch up with them. After doing so he acted as a courier to Stockholm, returned to Molde where he followed the flight of the Norwegian National Treasury to Tromsø. From Tromsø, he left the country together with the government and royal family. They reached London, where Boye became a secretary in the Ministry of Finance-in-exile; from 1941 the Ministry of Defence-in-exile. He was promoted to assistant secretary in 1942. From 1944 he participated in the rebuilding after the liberation of Northern Norway, and in the spring of 1945 he was a secretary for the provisional government in Oslo, awaiting the return of the real government from exile after the war.

He was a legation concellor in Belgium from 1946 to 1948, assistant secretary in the Ministry of Foreign Affairs from 1948 to 1949, secretary-general for the Northern European group in NATO from 1949 to 1951. He was promoted to sub-director in the Ministry of Foreign Affairs in 1951 and deputy under-secretary of state in 1953. From 1955 to 1961 he worked as vice chief executive in the SAS Group, and he served as the Norwegian ambassador to Italy from 1961 to 1965. From 1962 he doubled as the ambassador to Greece. He was then the permanent under-secretary of state (the highest-ranking civil position) in the Ministry of Foreign Affairs from 1965 to 1971, then the Norwegian ambassador to Spain from 1972 to 1977 and Sweden from 1977 to 1981.

He was decorated as a Commander with Star of the Order of St. Olav in 1969.

Civic offices
Preceded by Johan Georg A. Ræder	Permanent under-secretary of state in the Norwegian Ministry of Foreign Affairs; 1965–1971	Succeeded by Sverre Gjellum
Diplomatic posts
Preceded by Knut Lykke	Norway's ambassador to Spain; 1972–1977	Succeeded by Arnt Jakob Jakobsen
