= Moritz Rabinowitz =

Norwegian activist (1887–1942)

- Born: 20 September 1887; Rajgród, Poland
- Died: 27 February 1942 (aged 54); Sachsenhausen concentration camp
- Cause of death: Murder by abuse and neglect
- Resting place: Unknown
- Citizenship: Norwegian
- Occupation: Industrialist
- Years active: 1909–1942
- Employer: Self-employed
- Known for: Industrial development, philanthropy, and anti-fascist activism
- Spouse: Johanne Goldberg
- Children: Edith, married Reichwald
- Parent(s): Isaac Levi; Chaya Rosa

Moritz Moses Rabinowitz (20 September 1887 – 27 February 1942) was a retail merchant based in the city of Haugesund, Norway. Rabinowitz was active in the Jewish community in Norway and was an early opponent of Nazism. After Nazi Germany invaded Norway, Rabinowitz was arrested and moved to Germany. He was murdered in Sachsenhausen concentration camp in 1942.

== Family ==
Rabinowitz was born in Rajgród into a Jewish family as a son of Isaac Levi and Chaya Rosa Rabinowitz. It is also known that he had two sisters and a younger brother. The brother – Herman Herschel – also emigrated to Norway and settled in Bergen. Rabinowitz wrote that he had witnessed "barbaric" murders during pogroms, particularly in Białystok. As long as he lived, Rabinowitz sent money to his parents in Poland.

Rabinowitz married Johanne Goldberg, the daughter of Salomon Goldberg who founded the Friedenstempel in Berlin. They had one child, Edith, born in 1918. She married the Austrian refugee Hans Reichwald, and they had a son Harry, born in 1940. Johanne Rabinowitz died on 25 November 1939, after relocating to Bergen to be near her sister Rosa, who had married Moritz's brother Hermann. Rabinowitz traveled extensively along the Norwegian west coast south of Bergen and apparently spent most weekends with his family.

By 1942, the widower Moritz Rabinowitz's family in Norway consisted of his daughter Edith, son-in-law Hans, grandson Harry, and sister-in-law Rosa, who was married to his brother Hermann. None of these would survive the Holocaust.

== Biography ==
Rabinowitz emigrated to Norway in 1909, at first finding work as a retail clerk in Bergen, then as a peddler. In 1911, he took over the lease of a small café in Haugesund and opened an apparel store with only two items in his inventory: one suit and one overcoat. Over time the business grew, and he moved to a larger location in Haugesund and ultimately opened stores also in Odda, Sauda, Stavanger, Egersund, and Kristiansand. He reinvested his profits and soon became a mainstay in the apparel retail business in southwestern Norway under the company name M. Rabinowitz. He also started an apparel manufacturing company called Condor. By 1940, Rabinowitz employed about 250 people. He also founded the Hotel Bristol in Haugesund. The Rabinowitz family also had a country home at Førdesfjorden they called Jødeland ("Jewland").

== Activism ==
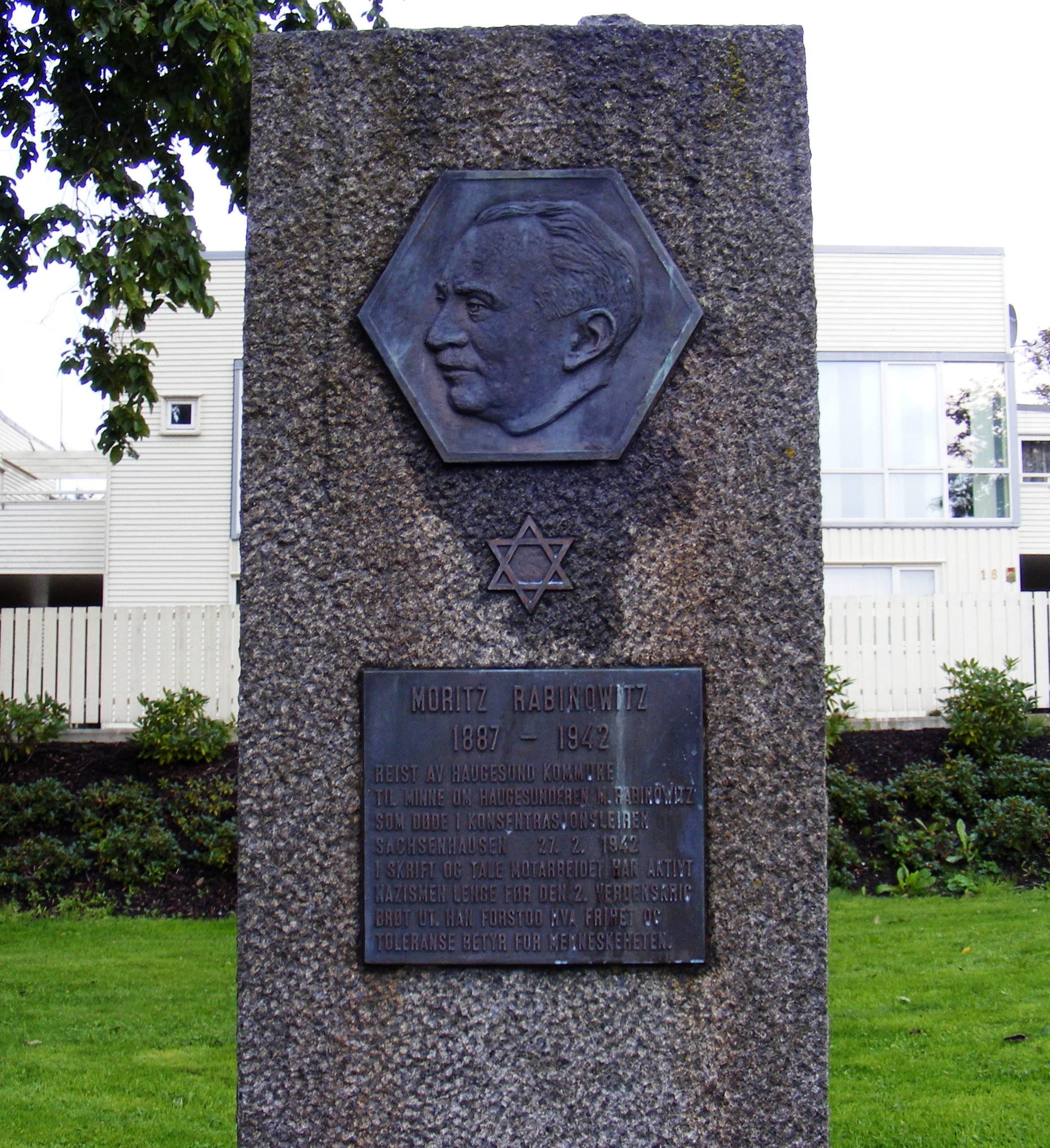
Memorial for Rabinowitz in Haugesund

Though he belonged to a small minority in an otherwise homogeneous and well-functioning society, Rabinowitz became a public figure in Haugesund and the surrounding region. He was a frequent contributor of opinion pieces to the local press, addressing issues including labor relations, relief aid to war-torn areas in Spain, Finland, and Austria. He made charitable donations to numerous causes. Among those that are known he gave gifts and financial support for Christmas celebrations in the local jail, orphanage, Blue Cross, and seaman's church. He donated an entire section of Åkrasanden on Karmøy to the citizens of Haugesund for their recreational purposes.

He was a voice against antisemitism. His nemesis in the op-ed pages was Eivind Saxlund, a voice for the antisemitism of the time. His involvement also got national attention from a leading proponent of racist antisemitism, Jon Alfred Mjøen, who brought the issue to the pages of Aftenposten. Rabinowitz also prevailed in a defamation lawsuit against Mikal Sylten, editor of Nationalt Tidsskrift. Taking place in June 1927, it was the second defamation lawsuit against Nationalt Tidsskrift, after the lawsuit from Kristiansund-based chief physician Ephraim Koritzinsky which took place in May.

Rabinowitz expressed his deep opposition to Nazism in the newspaper pages as early as 1933, figuring that Hitler's "career was only possible in an era as desperate and confused as today's." German Nazi newspapers named him as the Jewish community's secular leader in Norway. In 1934 he wrote that "the new Germany lives in a martial psychosis, specializing in child-rearing for war, and military technique...children are taught from the cradle to hate all foreign peoples and to kill them at the order to do so." In 1934 he also predicted a devastating world war, was unimpressed by the non-aggression treaty between Germany and the Soviet Union. He sent telegrams to world leaders, including Roosevelt, Hindenburg, and Chamberlain, imploring them to intervene on behalf of German Jews. In 1939 he demanded that Norway improve its coastal defense system against a German attack and occupation.

His involvement prompted one reporter to write in Egersundsposten, on 30 January 1940, that: "There may be no other Norwegian who has traveled more extensively in Europe than as Rabinowitz, and he knows the flashpoint Poland inside and out... Rabinowitz is the kind of Jew who shouts from the rooftops that he is a Jew... some may find this irritating... but in truth Rabinowitz is more Norwegian than most of us".

== Capture, deportation, and death ==
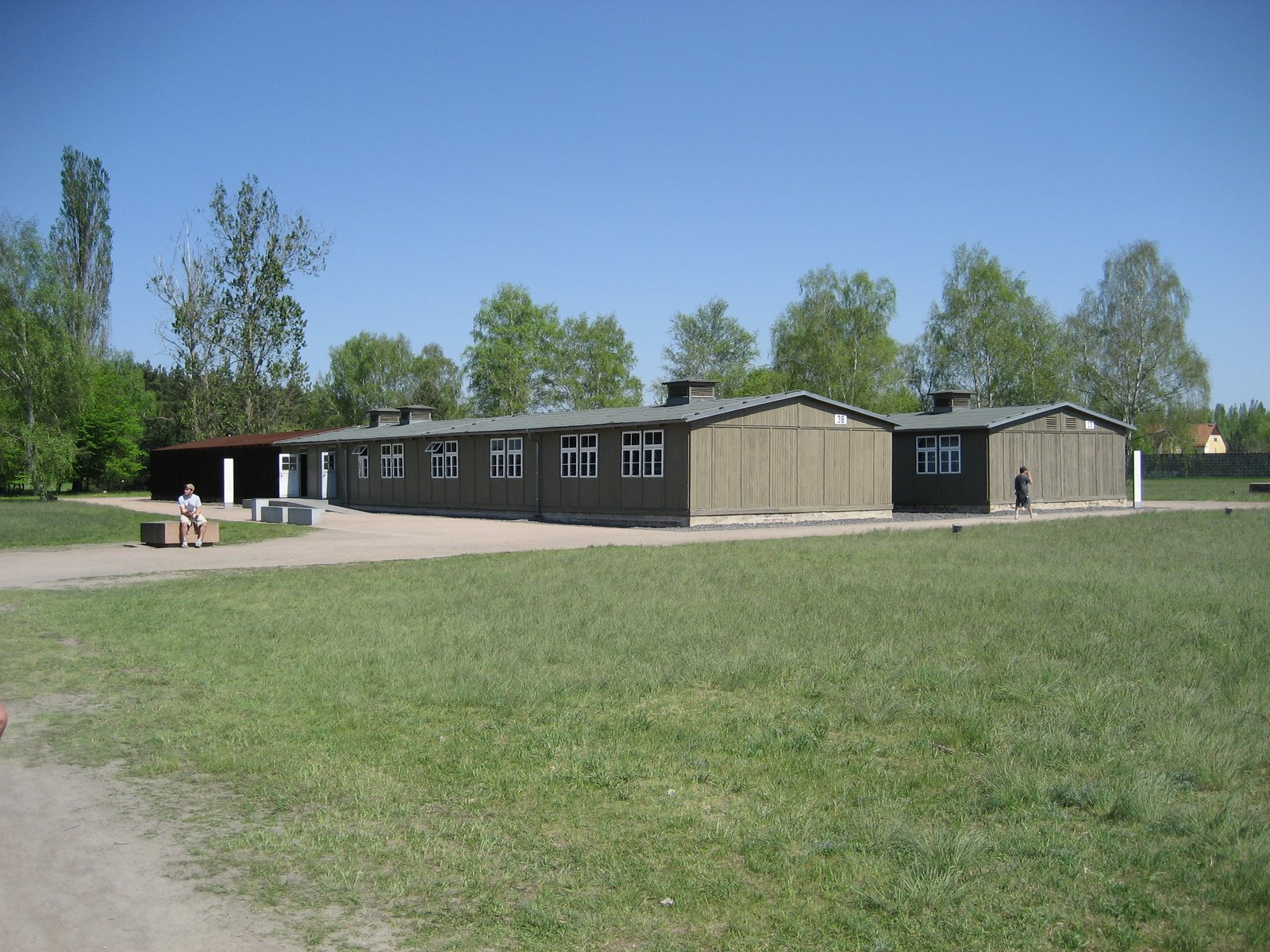
According to an eye witness, Rabinowitz was stomped to death outside the nearest barracks on this picture

Rabinowitz expected that the war would come to Norway. On 8 April, the day before the surprise attack came, he submitted his last op-ed article to Haugesunds Avis in which he asked readers to give the Norwegian soldier respect and support. The German army landed in Norway on 9 April and Haugesund on 10 April. The Gestapo made capturing Rabinowitz a high priority in the little coastal town. Rabinowitz had prepared several places along the coast as hiding places and moved from one to the other with Gestapo on his tracks. Following the war, there was some debate as to why Rabinowitz did not avail himself of four known opportunities to flee the country by sea to England. Among the townspeople of Haugesund, it was rumored that he was too invested in his company and his money. This view, reinforced by stereotypes was rejected in the local papers when Rabinowitz's (non-Jewish) business manager and several employees emphatically stated that such motivations would be uncharacteristic of him. Subsequent op-ed pieces have argued that he declined passage on two occasions for reasons unrelated to his business affairs.

They finally caught up with him in Skånevik Municipality, probably by shadowing employees who were conveying business decisions between Rabinowitz and his businesses. By then, his daughter, son-in-law, and grandson had joined him.

Rabinowitz was first detained in the regional jail at Lagård in Stavanger, was then sent to Møllergata 19 jail in Oslo on 26 February 1941 and then to Ånebyleiren concentration camp on 22 March, until he was sent back to Møllergata 19 on 25 April, where he remained until his deportation on the MS Monte Rosa 22 May 1941. The Monte Rosa landed in Stettin, where he wrote his will. Rabinowitz ended up in Sachsenhausen, where he was placed in the barracks for Jews, though he was officially categorized as a political prisoner. He died on 27 February 1942. The death certificate lists pneumonia as the cause of death, but according to a fellow prisoner, Rabinowitz was kicked and stomped to death outside Barrack 38 in Sachsenhausen. Rabinowitz's brother, daughter, grandson, and son-in-law were all later deported and murdered in Auschwitz.

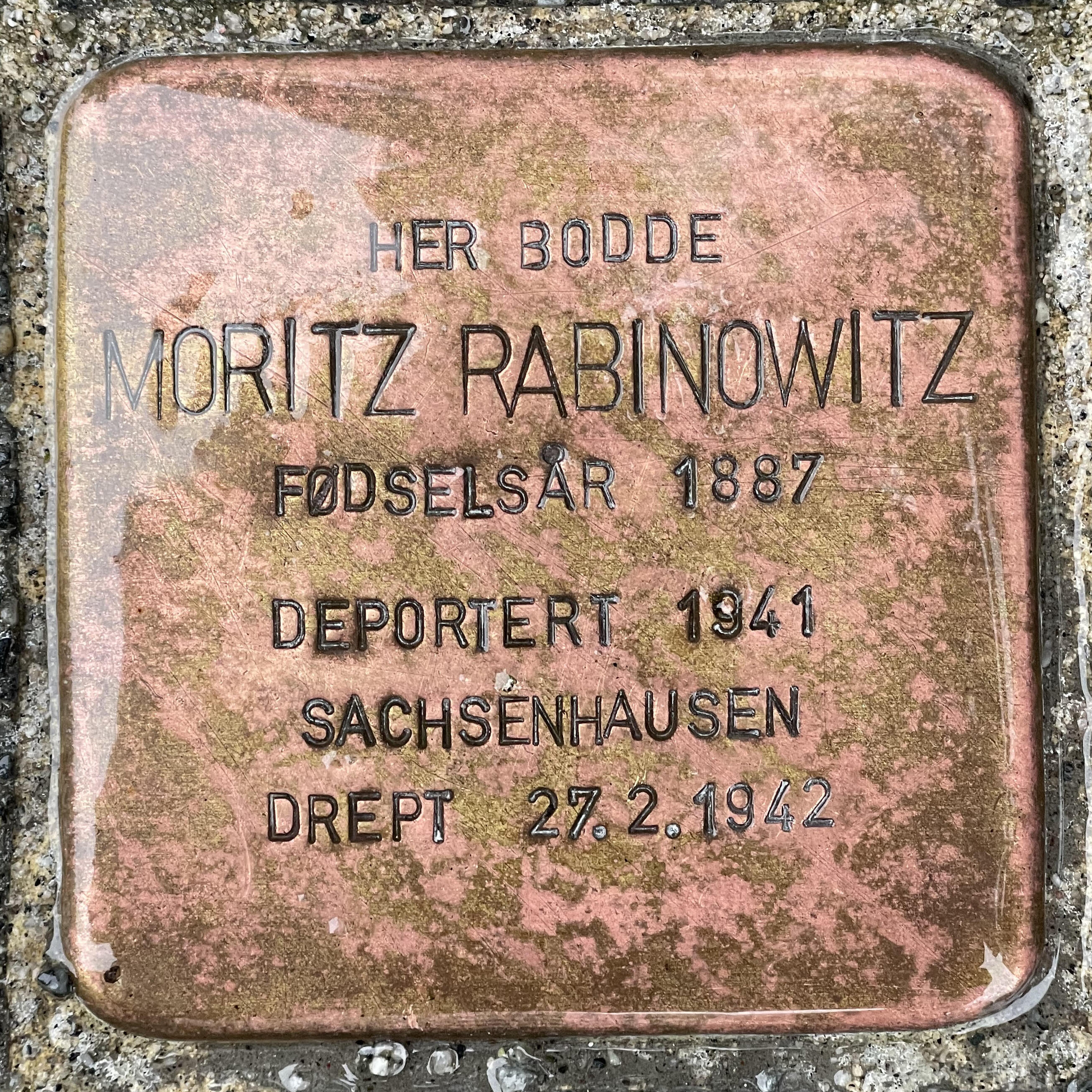
Stolperstein commemorating Moritz Rabinowitz in Haugesund

As it happened, Rabinowitz managed to convey his last greetings via a German inmate and another inmate from Haugesund to the people of Haugesund. These were reproduced in the obituary that was published on 20 June 1945. On 6 May 1986, the people of Haugesund erected a memorial stone for Rabinowitz.

Rabinowitz also dictated and signed his last will and testament to a fellow inmate, Christian Wilhelm Rynning-Tønnesen, where he left all his earthly belongings to his daughter Edith, also expressing a wish that his businesses continue as going concerns. Since Edith and her entire family also were murdered, what was left of Rabinowitz's estate went into probate after the war. After the occupying powers had confiscated his businesses, and at least NOK 300,000 in cash and securities, his estate was valued at NOK 986,000 at the end of the war.
