= Norsk fangeleksikon. Grinifangene =

1946 Norwegian biographical dictionary

Norsk fangeleksikon. Grinifangene is a Norwegian biographical dictionary with details on prisoners incarcerated at the Grini concentration camp between 1941 and 1945.

The encyclopedia was published in 1946 by the publishing house J.W. Cappelens Forlag, and edited by Børre R. Giertsen. It contains nearly 20,000 short biographical entries, ordered by prison number. The ordering more or less corresponds chronologically to the order of arrival at Grini, with a few exceptions. Each entry contains year of birth, date and cause of arrest, date of arrival at Grini and other prisons, and possibly release date or date of death. The book also contains an overview of the organization of the Grini camp, including members of the German staff.
