= Fannrem concentration camp =

Former concentration camp in Norway

Fannrem
- Concentration camp
- Location in Trøndelag Fannrem concentration camp (Norway)
- Coordinates: 63°15′59″N 09°48′56″E
- Location: Orkland Municipality, Norway
- Original use: Slave labor
- First built: Oct 1944
- Operational: 1944-1945

Fannrem concentration camp (Norwegian: Fannrem fangeleir) was a concentration camp that was located at Fannrem in the old Orkdal Municipality in Sør-Trøndelag county, Norway (now part of Orkland Municipality in Trøndelag county). It was established as an annex to the Grini concentration camp by the Nazi authorities in Norway in October 1944 and lasted until the end of the war.

The camp consisted of military barracks that held between 6 and 20 prisoners who were kept very isolated. Up to 200 prisoners were in the camp at one time. The prisoners were engaged in hard labor while at Fannrem. Prisoners were put to work as slave labor on the Thamshavn Line railroad.

== See also ==
- List of Nazi-German concentration camps
