= RMO (Norwegian resistance) =

RMO was a Norwegian clandestine organization for naval intelligence during World War II, led from Oslo. The organization operated from Spring 1942 until the end of the war in the spring of 1945.

== Establishment ==
RMO was established by Kapteinløytnant Andreas Rygg, as an initiative from naval attaché Hans Henriksen at the Norwegian legation in Stockholm. Because of the German mass arrest of Norwegian military officers in 1943, Rygg fled to Sweden, and the organization was subsequently led by Martin Siem and Sigurd Sverdrup.

== Network ==
RMO's primary goal was to establish contacts in the cities along the Norwegian coast. The contact persons were typically harbourmasters, maritime pilots and other sea workers or harbour workers. Siem and Sverdrup had earlier cooperated with Gunnar Sønsteby, and this cooperation continued after RMO was formed. RMO used Sønsteby's courier network to bring messages to Stockholm, and Sønsteby's organization obtained reliable information on ships and traffic. In addition to Oslo, ROM had branches in cities such as Halden, Kristiansand, Stavanger, Haugesund, Bergen, Trondheim and Tromsø. When Rygg moved to Stockholm in 1943, he was employed as second-in-command at the office MI II, the section for military intelligence at the Norwegian legation in Stockholm, and from then on it was possible to coordinate XU's and RMO's activities in the seaport towns. RMO also cooperated with the Milorg department for naval intelligence EV 13. The initial Trondheim group was destroyed by the Gestapo during 1943, but another group with contacts at Trondheim harbour and the submarine harbour was initiated in 1944. In Oslo RMO also had contacts at the Norwegian Maritime Directorate, the Norwegian Hydrographic Service, the Lighthouse administration, the Railways and the Telegraph.

== Intelligence ==
Most of the information collected by RMO was of a static nature. Some also had operative value. Information from Oslo harbour provided by RMO was important for the sabotage missions against German ships in Oslo, carried out by SOE (NOR.I.C.1) agents Max Manus, Gregers Gram and others.

== Post war ==
RMO was intact until the end of World War II. After the war the organization was supposed to be dissolved, along with other intelligence networks such as XU and Zero. During the Cold War agents from the war period might have been recruited to intelligence networks or Stay-behind groups.
