= Falstad Centre =

Memorial site in Ekne, Norway

- Falstadsenteret
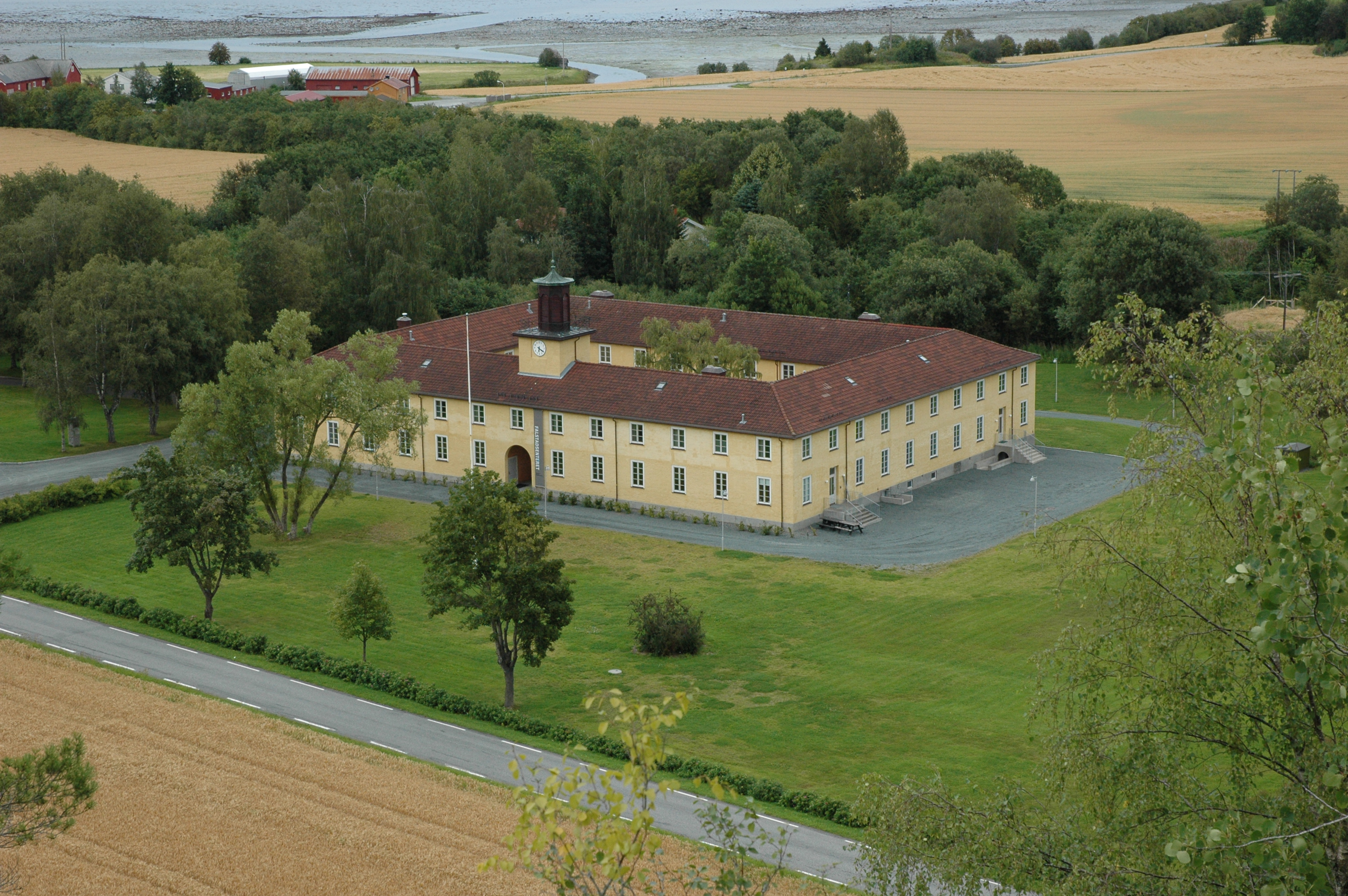

- Location in Trøndelag Falstad Centre (Norway)
- Location: Ekne, Norway
- Coordinates: 63°41′29.08″N 11°2′29.33″E
- Website: falstadsenteret.no

The Falstad Centre (Norwegian: Falstadsenteret) and Falstad Museum is a memorial site in Ekne, Norway. The Falstad Centre Foundation was established in August 2000 as a national centre for the education and documentation of the history of imprisonment during the Second World War, humanitarian international law and human rights.

The institution also house a museum collection, built up from the establishment of the first Falstad museum in 1985. In 2006, the centre moved into what was once the main building in the SS camp Falstad. From that time, the institution has also conducted extensive work on the development of the former camp area as a memorial landscape.

== Location and history ==
The Falstad Centre is a memorial site and center for human rights. The center consists of the Falstad concentration camp and Falstad Woods, which stand nearby and were used as an execution site by the German occupation authorities. Today the woods are a war grave and protected national heritage site.

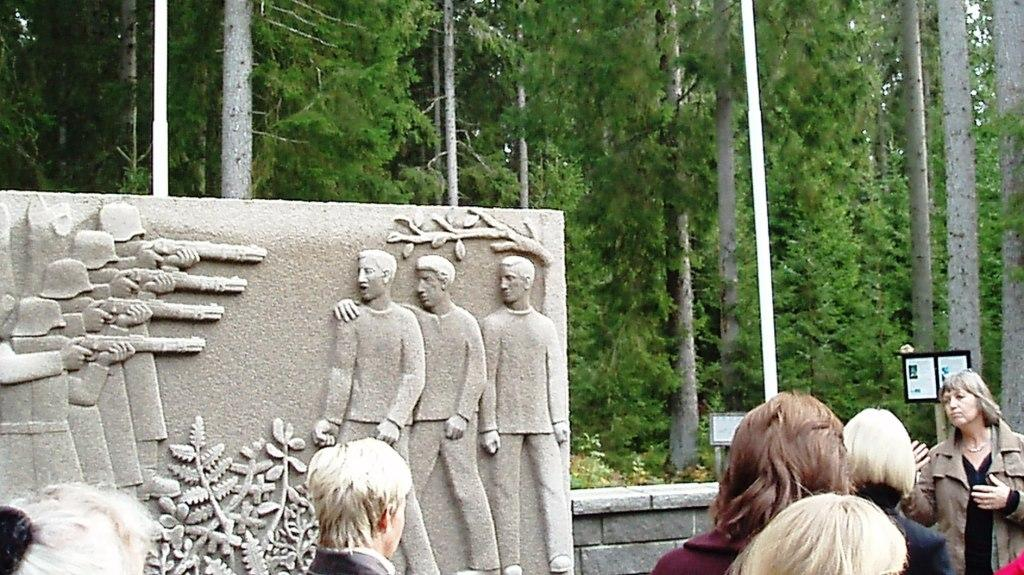
The Falstad Centre's director, Tone Jørstad, guides a group in the woods where prisoners were killed. The relief Arkebusering (Execution by Firing Squad), by Odd Hilt, shows a German firing squad executing three Norwegian patriots.

The Falstad Museum was established in 1995 in connection with the 50th anniversary of liberation at the end of the Second World War. It has been set up in the basement of what was the main building of the Falstad concentration camp (German: SS Strafgefangenenlager Falstad). The Falstad Centre foundation was established in 2000 and is a national educational and documentation center covering the wartime history of prisoners of war, humanitarian law, and human rights. The center was opened on 7 October 2006. The center collaborates with various educational and art institutions including schools and universities, research centers, archives, and human rights organizations.

== Faces of Power ==
In spring 2019, the Falstad Centre initiated the project "Faces of Power – Art in the Commander's Residence," Six artists and writers were invited to discuss and propose artistic expressions to be incorporated into the former commander's house: Anne Helga Henning, Dag Hoel, Edvine Larsen, Tore Reisch, Ingrid Storholmen and Gulabuddin Sukhanwar, founder of Literature for Inclusion.

The first phase of the project was carried out with support from the Arts Council Norway and the Fritt Ord Foundation. Now, the Commander's Residence serves as a place for different artistic projects and welcomes visitors from Norway and Europe.

== Exhibitions ==
The exhibition 70-årsmarkering for ankomsten av jugoslaviske fanger til Norge under andre verdenskrig (transl. Seventieth Anniversary of the Arrival of Yugoslav Prisoners in Norway during World War II) was held at the center in 2012.

== Collaboration ==
Falstad Centre collaborates on various project with different universities, schools and human rights organization, art and culture centres to promote human rights education.

== Research ==
Research and development are core activities in the work of the Falstad Centre. Our research staff has expertise in the subjects of philosophy, history, cultural heritage management, art history and comparative literature. We work closely with the universities in the region and with other national and international institutions.

== See also ==
- Falstad concentration camp
- Falstad Reform School
- German occupation of Norway
