= Bardufoss concentration camp =

Nazi concentration camp in Norway

Coordinates: 69.0645°N 18.5151°E

The Bardufoss concentration camp was located in Northern Norway in Målselv Municipality. During the occupation of Norway by Nazi Germany, the Nazi authorities established a "concentration camp in the town of Bardufoss," as an annex to the Grini concentration camp. It opened in March 1944 to alleviate overflowing in other camps, particularly Grini and the Falstad concentration camp. Situated in a cold climate, it was notorious for its hard work regime, sparse rations, and inadequate shelter. It is estimated that some 800 prisoners passed through the camp, and when liberated about 550 were incarcerated.

== See also ==
- Glossary of Nazi Germany
- The Holocaust
- List of books about Nazi Germany
- List of concentration and internment camps
- List of Nazi-German concentration camps
- Nazi concentration camps
- Nazi Party
- Nazi songs
- World War II
