= Ludwig Runzheimer =

SS-Oberscharführer Ludwig Runzheimer
- Runzheimer on 11 June 1945
- Born: 28 July 1912; Gladenbach, Hesse, German Empire
- Died: 6 July 1946 (age 33); Sverresborg Fortress, Bergen, Norway
- Status: Executed by firing squard
- Conviction: War crimes
- Penalty: Death
- Military career
- Allegiance: Nazi Germany
- Branch: Schutzstaffel
- Service years: 1938-1945
- Rank: SS-Oberscharführer
- Unit: Gestapo Division IV A
- Commands: Senior Guard, Espeland detention camp
- Conflicts: World War II

Ludwig Runzheimer (28 July 1912 – 6 July 1946) was a German SS-Oberscharführer in the Gestapo during World War II. During the last months of the war he held a central position at the Espeland detention camp in occupied Norway, where he became notorious for sadistic behaviour and torture of prisoners.

Following the liberation of Norway, he was arrested and sentenced to death for war crimes. He was executed by the Norwegian state on 6 July 1946.

== Early life ==
Ludwig Runzheimer was born on 28 July 1912 in the town of Gladenbach in Hesse, Germany. A member of the Nazi Party since 1934, he trained as a radio operator in the Luftwaffe and from November 1938 he served in the German border police. After the outbreak of war in 1939, he went into the Geheime Feldpolizei and served in the Netherlands, Belgium, France, and Russia. In September 1944, he was ordered to Bergen, Norway, where he worked for the Sicherheitspolizei (SiPo) in Gestapo Division IV A. In this role he was directly involved in the torture of prisoners.

== Espeland detention camp ==
In 1945, the head of SiPo in Bergen, Ernst Weimann, needed a way to tighten lax conditions at the nearby Espeland detention camp. He also wished to remove Runzheimer (who had a past criminal conviction in Germany) from his department. Being aware of Runzheimer's cruel character, Weimann solved both problems by transferring him out of Bergen to Espeland, where he was assigned as a special guard tasked with enforcing a stricter regime.

The camp commander at Espeland, SS-Oberscharführer Georg Eberl, had been treating prisoners reasonably well, but this changed with the arrival of Runzheimer on 1 March 1945. Under the approval of his new superior, SS-Hauptsturmführer Eugen Nemitz, Runzheimer presided over a reign of terror in the camp. Strictly enforcing the rules and punishing the slightest mistake, he greatly increased use of the camp's isolation cells. He also initiated a programme of punitive exercises to follow the ten hour camp workday. This would include forcing prisoners to perform hare jumps to the point of exhaustion, making them run across the camp while carrying full buckets of excrement from the latrine, and making the weakest carry him on their backs. In addition to this, he was also physically violent, dishing out beatings with a stick and trampling prisoners. On one occasion, in the middle of winter, he ordered inmates to roll in dirt before forcing them to wash off in the nearby river. Some of the prisoners died of exhaustion.

Runzheimer carried on in this manner until the camp was liberated on 9 May 1945 after the end of World War II in Europe.

== Trial and execution ==
Fearing consequences for their brutal treatment of camp prisoners, many of the guards (including Runzheimer) abandoned Espeland shortly before it was liberated by Norwegian police. However, many of the officers had left portraits of themselves hung up on the walls inside the barracks and this enabled prisoners to identify the worst offenders to the authorities. Runzheimer was eventually arrested in Sunnhordland.

He was put on trial on 15 January 1946. Dr. Koren, who had been imprisoned at Espeland during Runzheimer's tenure, testified against him (translated from Norwegian):

I got the impression of Runzheimer as a sadistic Gestapist. He rejoiced when he could torment his fellow human beings and when he became ecstatic, he seemed as a man who was not aware of his actions. On a daily basis he was nervous, impulsive, constantly in motion, surely also sleepless, and I mostly perceive him as insane. That is not meant as a mitigating circumstance.

Dr. Koren also detailed the various injuries he had treated at the camp as a result of Runzheimer's behaviour. Runzheimer himself claimed that he had only performed his military duty, refusing to admit to serious abuses. He was found guilty and sentenced to death by the Gulating Court of Appeal on 13 April 1946. He was the only German sentenced to death in Norway who did not appeal his case.

Runzheimer was executed by firing squad at Sverresborg Fortress in Bergen in the morning hours of 6 July 1946.

== See also ==
- Grini detention camp
- Tromsdalen detention camp
- Siegfried Fehmer
- Gerhard Flesch
- Irma Grese
