= Alfred Zeidler =

German Schutzstaffel (SS) officer

SS-Hauptsturmführer Alfred Zeidler
- Born: 22 September 1902; Danzig, Kingdom of Prussia, German Empire
- Military career
- Allegiance: Nazi Germany
- Branch: Schutzstaffel
- Service years: 1933-1945
- Rank: SS-Hauptsturmführer
- Commands: Lagerkommandant of Grini detention camp
- Conflicts: World War II

Alfred Zeidler (born 22 September 1902) was a German Schutzstaffel (SS) officer who served Nazi Germany in World War II. From 1942 to 1945, he was Lagerkommandant of the Grini detention camp in Norway during the German occupation. Although sentenced to lifelong forced labour after the war, Zeidler was released in 1953. Details of his later life are unknown.

== Early life ==
Alfred Zeidler was born on 22 September 1902 in Danzig – at that time part of West Prussia in the German Empire – as the son of a locksmith. He then lived in Braunschweig where he worked as a broker in the shipping industry and as a colporteur before becoming unemployed.

After Hitler's rise to power in 1933, Zeidler joined NSDAP and the SS, becoming a member of the Sicherheitsdienst (SD) in 1937. He was eventually promoted to SS-Hauptsturmführer.

At some point, Zeidler married and had two children.

== At Grini detention camp ==
On 30 June 1942, Zeidler took part in an inspection of the Grini detention camp in Bærum, Norway, which was being used by the SS to hold political prisoners. The next month, on 15 July, he returned with Hellmuth Reinhard (head of the Gestapo in Norway), who appointed Zeidler as Lagerkommandant of the camp. In his first meeting with the camp prisoners, he announced that they would soon become accustomed to "Prussian discipline".

He held his post at Grini until the end of World War II in Europe.

== Post-war ==
Following the surrender of Nazi Germany on 8 May 1945, many SS officers (fearing reprisals for war crimes) attempted to disguise themselves as ordinary soldiers and blend in with the Wehrmacht. Zeidler was eventually discovered with a group of around 75 Gestapo men who, led by Heinrich Fehlis (SiPo and SD commander in Norway), had disguised themselves in Gebirgskorps Norwegen uniforms and hidden in a camp near Porsgrunn. The camp was eventually surrounded by Milorg and the troops were forced to surrender; Fehlis committed suicide and Zeidler was apprehended with the other men.

In 1947, as part of the legal purge in Norway after World War II, Zeidler was sentenced to forced labour for the rest of his life. He was released from prison and expelled from Norway in 1953.

== See also ==
- Josef Terboven
- Ludwig Runzheimer
- Siegfried Fehmer
- Victoria Terrasse
- Beisfjord massacre
- Operation Blumenpflücken
- Espeland detention camp
