= Sigurd Sverdrup =

Norwegian resistance member (1918–2008)

Sigurd Bernhard Sverdrup (1 June 1918 – 16 May 2008) was a Norwegian World War II resistance member.

He studied law during the early phase of World War II. He became a member of the resistance group 2A. Here he gained contact with Martin Siem, a worker at the mechanic yard Akers Mekaniske Verksted. Both were recruited to the secret intelligence organization RMO. Siem was an informant regarding his workplace, whereas Sverdrup gained a direct channel to the executive of the Oslo Port Authority. When the leader of RMO, A.K. Rygg, had to flee the country in the autumn 1943, Siem and Sverdrup took over the leadership. Sverdrup was specifically tasked with coordinating naval intelligence in the Oslofjord, from Kristiansand in the west to Halden in the east. RMO cooperated with XU and Milorg, and information on the Port of Oslo became especially important for Norwegian ship saboteurs, such as Max Manus, Gregers Gram and Roy Nielsen.

Sverdrup died in 2008.
