= Thorvald Boye =

Norwegian judge

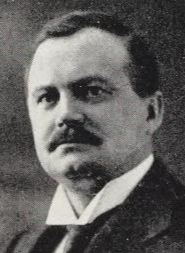
- Born: 1 February 1871; Arendal, Norway
- Died: 10 December 1943 (aged 72)
- Education: University of Oslo
- Occupation: Supreme Court Justice
- Spouse: Mia Esmarch (1880–1966)
- Children: Thore Boye
- Awards: Order of the Polar Star; Order of Wasa; Order of the Dannebrog

Thorvald Boye (1 February 1871 – 10 December 1943) was a Norwegian Supreme Court Justice, educator and legal scholar.

== Biography ==
He was born in Arendal to Albert Boye and Johanne Hansen. He graduated as cand.jur. in 1894 and dr. jur. in 1912. He continued his studies at the universities of Berlin, Geneva and Paris. From 1913, he worked in the Ministry of Labor and Social Affairs (Sosialdepartementet). He also taught national and international law at the Norwegian Military College and University of Oslo.He was appointed as a Supreme Court Justice in 1922.

== Personal life ==
He was married to Mia Esmarch (1880–1966). They were the parents of diplomat Thore Boye. In 1901, he was awarded the Crown Prince's gold medal (Kronprinsens gullmedalje) by the University of Oslo. He was decorated Commander of the Order of the Dannebrog, Commander of the Order of the Polar Star and Commander of the Order of Vasa.

== Selected works ==
- Haandbok i folkeret (1918)
- Norsk medicinallovgivning (1920)
- Kongeriget Norges grundlov (1935)
