= Andreas Rygg =

Norwegian military officer (1909–1999)

- Born: 22 March 1909 Horten, Norway
- Died: 2 April 1999 (aged 90)
- Allegiance: Norway
- Branch: Royal Norwegian Navy
- Conflicts: World War II
- Awards: Defence Medal 1940–1945; Order of the Sword; Order of Dannebrog

Andreas Kielland Rygg (22 March 1909 – 2 April 1999) was a Norwegian military officer.

He was born in Horten, a son of naval commander Andreas Andersen and Nelly Kielland. He finished secondary school in 1929 and graduated as a naval officer in 1932. He married Sofie Gram in 1937, daughter of stipendiary magistrate Harald Gram and sister of Gregers Gram.

He served on several vessels, from 1939 as second-in-command of HNoMS B-6. In May 1940 he temporarily left naval service, being hired in the Ministry of Provisioning in the summer. During the German occupation of Norway he established the clandestine organization for naval intelligence RMO, which operated from Oslo from the spring of 1942. Rygg chaired RMO until he had to flee to Sweden in 1943, due to the German mass arrest of Norwegian military officers. From 1943 to 1945 he served at the military office of the Norwegian Legation in Stockholm.

He served as naval attaché in Stockholm and Copenhagen from 1948 to 1950, and assistant naval attaché in Washington, D.C. from 1950 to 1952. He was Border Commissioner at the Norway-Soviet border from 1962 to 1969, and then worked in the naval staff until 1974.

He was decorated with the Defence Medal 1940–1945, was a Knight, First Class of the Swedish Order of the Sword, and the Danish Order of Dannebrog.
