= Gerhard Flesch =

Nazi war criminal (1909–1948)

Gerhard Friedrich Ernst Flesch
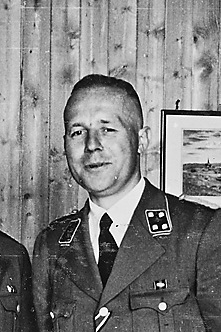
- Flesch in 1942
- Born: 18 October 1909; Posen, Prussia, German Empire
- Died: 28 February 1948 (aged 38); Kristiansten Fortress, Norway
- Status: Executed by firing squad
- Conviction: War crimes
- Penalty: Death

Details
- Victims: 340+
- Span of crimes: 1939 – March 1945
- Country: Poland and Norway
- Military career
- Allegiance: Nazi Germany
- Branch: Reich Security Main Office (RSHA)
- Service years: 1936–1945
- Rank: SS-Obersturmbannführer
- Commands: Einsatzkommando 2/VI

Gerhard Friedrich Ernst Flesch (8 October 1909 – 28 February 1948) was a German SS functionary during the Nazi era. After World War II, he was tried, found guilty and executed for his crimes, specifically the torture and murder of members of the Norwegian resistance movement.

== Background ==
Flesch was an Oberregierungsrat and held the rank of SS-Obersturmbannführer (lieutenant colonel). He was born in Posen, Province of Posen, German Empire. Flesch became a member of Nazi Party (NSDAP) in 1933. In 1934, he obtained his law degree and by 1936 was a member of the Gestapo, when Reinhard Heydrich appointed him over a unit to control the religious sects of Germany. In 1938, Flesch took part in the German march into the Sudetenland, and in 1939, in the annexation of Bohemia and Moravia. Later he was appointed political adviser to Gauleiter Fritz Sauckel in Thuringia.

== Career in World War II ==
After the outbreak of the war in September, 1939, Flesch became leader of Einsatzkommando 2/VI in Poznań (German: Posen). Between 20 and 23 October 1939, the 14 Einsatzkommando that he commanded executed 275 Poles in the Greater Poland region near Poznań who were named as Polish patriots by Wolfgang Bickerich, the Lutheran pastor in Leszno, who had kept a list before the German invasion of Poland in 1939. They included political leaders, teachers, police officers, Catholic priests, workers, and farmers, and included scouts as young as 18. This was the start of Operation Tannenberg organized by Reinhard Heydrich which was meant to eliminate Polish leaders in the parts of Poland annexed to Germany. Flesch's men shot more than 40 more people in November 1939.

In 1940, Flesch joined the 3rd SS Division Totenkopf in their march into France. He had a position as Regierungsrat (Executive Council, government advisor), and was an SS-Sturmbannführer (major) in April 1940, when he was assigned to Norway. His first job in Norway was Kommandeur der SiPo und des SD in Bergen (the Sicherheitsdienst (SD; Security Service) was primarily the intelligence service of the SS and the Nazi Party, where the Sicherheitspolizei (SiPo; Security Police) was a term used in Nazi Germany to describe the state political and criminal investigation security agencies. It was made up by the combined forces of the Gestapo (secret state police) and the Kripo (criminal police) between 1936 and 1939. Thereafter, they became departments of the Reich Security Main Office (RSHA). On 11 October 1941, Flesch was appointed Kommandeur der Sicherheitspolizei und des Sicherheitsdienst in Trondheim. As Kommandeur of the district, he was also chief of Falstad concentration camp outside Trondheim and the prisons in Trondheim. He was promoted to the rank of Obersturmbannführer (lieutenant colonel) and received the title of Oberregierungsrat. Flesch's immediate superior was Heinrich Fehlis. On 8 May 1945, he fled from Trondheim with a gold bar in his luggage. He was caught and sent back with a police escort on the train and during which he made an unsuccessful attempt to escape.

== Trial and execution ==
Flesch was known for being a notorious torturer, and ordered the execution of many members of the Norwegian resistance movement without any trial. After World War II, in 1946, he was tried for the many cases of torture and murder. He was charged with a series of war crimes committed in Norway; seven instances of ordering the murders of a total of 37 prisoners, albeit four of those targeted were not killed, five instances of torture (verschärfte Vernehmung: "enhanced interrogation") and one instance of withholding medical treatment resulting in death. Flesch was found guilty of ordering 25 murders, 21 of which were carried out, all counts of torture, and the withholding medical treatment charges. He was sentenced to death by execution by firing squad. Flesch appealed to the Supreme Court of Norway on procedural grounds and that the sentence was too harsh; however on 12 February 1948 his appeal was rejected. The sentence was carried out at midnight at Kristiansten Fortress on 28 February 1948. Right before the order was given to fire, Flesch shouted "Heil Hitler!"
