= Falstad concentration camp =

Nazi concentration camp in Trøndelag, Norway

- Concentration camp
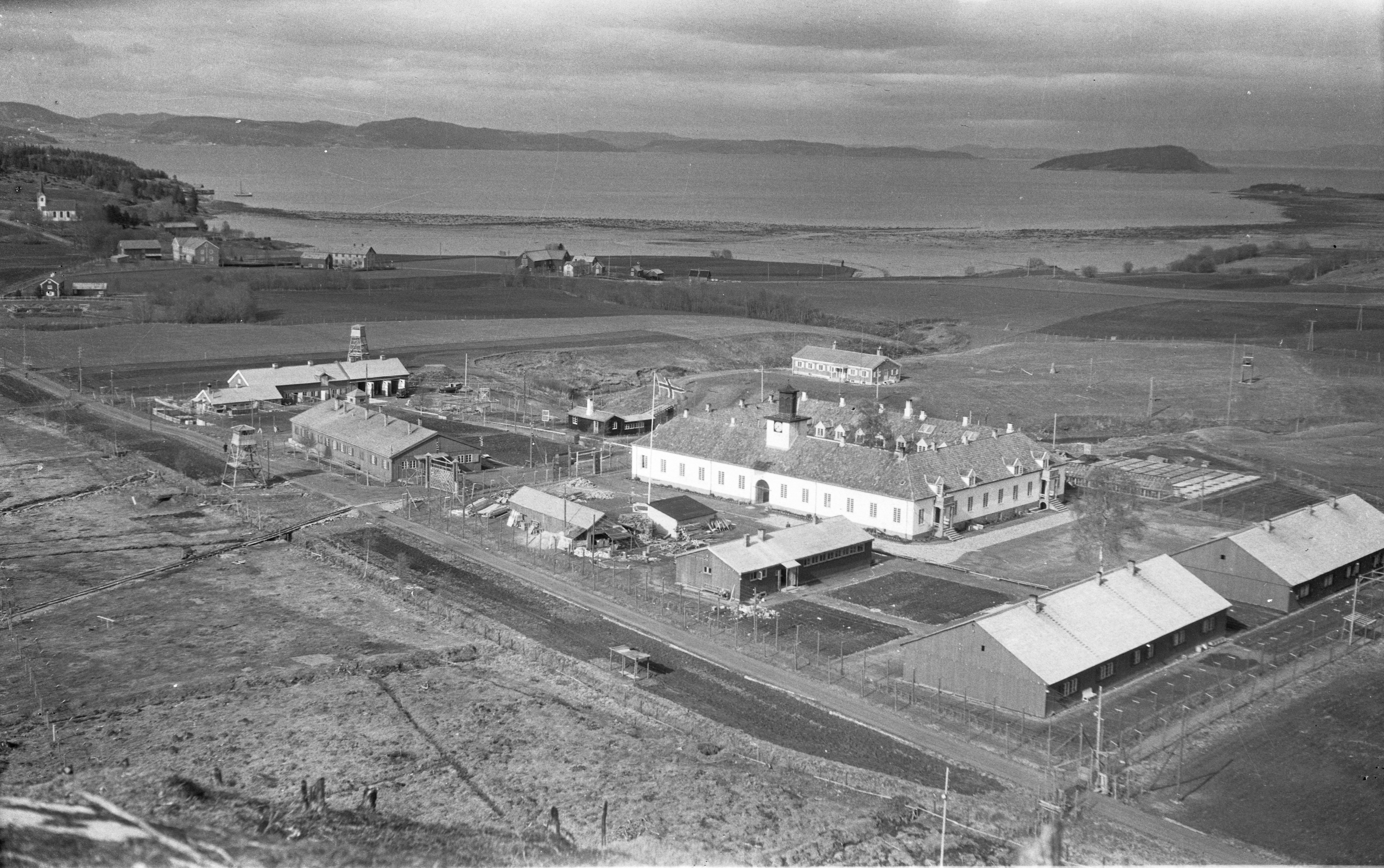
- Aerial photo of Falstad concentration camp taken shortly after the May 1945 German capitulation.

- Location within Trøndelag Location within Norway
- Coordinates: 63.6914°N 11.0413°E
- Other names: German: SS-Strafgefangenenlager Falstad, Norwegian: Falstad fangeleir
- Location: Levanger Municipality, Trøndelag
- Built by: Norway
- Operated by: Nazi Germany
- Original use: Boarding school for boys
- First built: 1895-1910
- Operational: August 1941 - May 1945
- Website: https://falstadsenteret.no/en/history/the-falstad-centre

Falstad concentration camp (Norwegian: Falstad fangeleir or German: SS-Strafgefangenenlager Falstad) was situated in the village of Ekne in what was Skogn Municipality (now part of Levanger Municipality in Trøndelag county) in Norway. It was used mostly for political prisoners from Nazi-occupied territories.

== Falstad boarding school ==
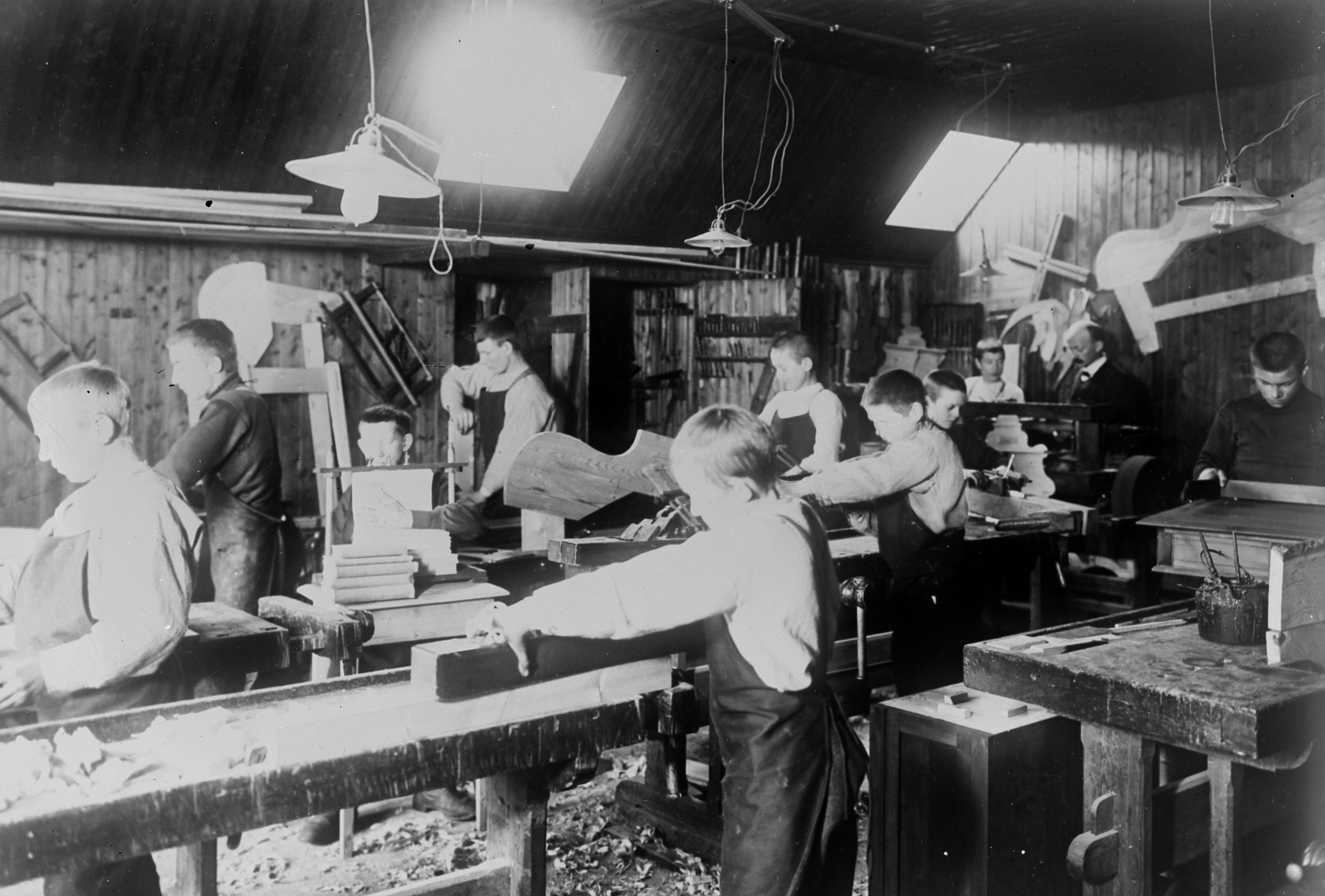
Woodwork class at Falstad

The boarding school for boys at Falstad was founded as part of the general movement in Europe generally and Norway in particular, to reform the penal system, especially for children. Prison director Anders Daae took the initiative in founding a private institution in Trøndelag, to be modeled after similar schools in Europe. He raised funds primarily through the Trondhjems Brændevinssamlag (transl. Trondheim liquor cooperative) and Trondhjems Sparebank (transl. Trondheim Savings Bank) and acquired the farm known as Nedre Falstad for 80,000 kr in 1895, along with the farm buildings. It was explicitly originated to serve the needs of the "misguided" (Norwegian: vanartede) rather than criminal youth through education, labor, and a "Christian spirit."

The main building burned down the same year the institution was established. New buildings were constructed, and in 1910, the Norwegian government took over the operations of the school. In 1921, there was another fire, and the new brick structures that followed were based on 19th century prison designs, with a courtyard in the middle of a rectangular building.

== Use as a prison camp ==
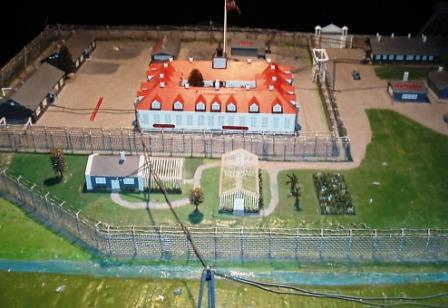
Scale model of the Falstad camp

Nazi German authorities first visited Falstad in August 1941 with the hope of making it a center for the Lebensborn program in Norway, but found it unsuitable for this task. However, they quickly decided to put it to use as a prison camp in September 1941. The inhabitants of Ekne were put under severe restrictions, and the first prisoners arrived—about 170 Danes who had volunteered and then reneged on being a part of the Todt Organisation. The Danish inmates spent three months in the camp, using the time to start construction of the barbed wire fence and watch towers.

Within the command structure of Reichskommissariat Norwegen, the German occupying authorities in Norway, Falstad came under the civilian authority of Reichskommissar Josef Terboven through the Higher SS and Police Leader, Wilhelm Rediess, who was in charge of all German police, including the SS and Gestapo, and Heinrich Fehlis, who was the Befehlshaber der Sicherheitspolizei und des SD (BdS). For reasons that remain unclear, Falstad was part of the Fifth Section, known as the "Kriminalpolizei," or criminal police. For all practical purposes, however, Falstad became the personal prison of Gerhard Flesch, who was the leader of the regional Einsatzkommando V, with the title KdS Drontheim.

The camp inmate population grew steadily, new buildings were erected. Prison barracks were built southeast of the main building, utility buildings were constructed around the center, and the commander's quarters were erected nearby on the other side of the river. In all, the grounds were monitored from three watchtowers.

The camp authorities burned what documents they could before the liberation of 1945, but it is estimated that at least 4,500 prisoners passed through Falstad. Citizens of at least 13 countries were among these inmates. Although the camp was intended for political prisoners, several thousand prisoners of war (POWs) were kept there. Most of them were sent to other camps in Germany or Poland, or to Grini concentration camp, in Norway.

The camp also became notorious for its use as a transit camp for the deportation of Norwegian Jews to Auschwitz. Forty-seven Jewish men were imprisoned at Falstad at one point or another. One, Ephraim Wolff Koritzinsky, died of cancer at Levanger Hospital on 15 May 1942. At least eight were murdered at Falstad.

The main characteristic of the camp was forced, hard, and largely meaningless labour. Degradations and abuse were commonplace, particularly under the administration of SS-Hauptscharführer Gogol and Edward F. Lambrecht, a prison guard known among the prisoners as Gråbein (lit. 'Grayleg')—an appellation used in reference to wolves.

== Executions in Falstadskogen ==
The camp commanders used the nearby forest (Falstadskogen) as a site for extrajudicial executions of POWs, and following show trials of political and Jewish prisoners.

The first executions took place on 7 March 1942, when Olav Sverre Benjaminsen, Abel Lazar Bernstein, David Isaksen, Wulf Isaksen, and David Wolfsohn were shot. All of these, except Benjaminsen, were Jewish. In June 1942, Ljuban Vukovic, a Yugoslav POW, was made the first grave digger in the forest. He survived and became an important witness in the post-war trials.

On 6 October 1942, the Nazi authorities imposed martial law on sections of central Norway, and at least 170 non-Norwegian prisoners and 34 Norwegian political prisoners were killed in the forest (Falstadskogen) just south of Falstad. Among these were Hirsch Komissar, who was Jewish.

On 13 November 1942, Moritz Abrahamsen, Kalman Glick, and Herman Schidorsky, all Jewish, were killed. On 16 February 1943, Toralf Berg—a resistance fighter—was also executed. During the summer of 1943, a change in the command of the camp led to improved conditions for the remaining prisoners.

Throughout all this, more than 150 unnamed POWs were shot in the forest. During 4–5 May 1945, the camp authorities sought to exhume and hide the bodies of their victims, sinking about 25 in the fjord near the camp.

Efforts to find, exhume, identify and bury the victims are ongoing. The original estimate of 202 dead is considered low.

== Commanders and officials ==
- There were six camp commandants at Falstad during the war: Paul Schöning, Paul Gogol, Scharschmidt (first name unknown), Werner Jeck, Georg Bauer, and Karl Denk. None of these were prosecuted for war crimes in Norway, though Denk may have faced trial in Germany for unrelated charges.
- Gerhard Flesch, Kommandeur der Sicherheitspolizei und des SD Trondheim 1941 to 1945 was sentenced to death during the Legal purge in Norway after World War II.
- Walter Hollack, Gestapo officer who acted as "prosecutor" during the tribunals in 1942, was sentenced to a life term of hard labor, but was pardoned in 1953 and deported on 22 June that year.
- Hans Roth, section leader and for a short period executive officer, noted for his proclivity for beating up prisoners, was sentenced to 15 years of hard labor, but was pardoned and deported on 16 June 1950.
- Oscar Hans, leader of the Sonderkommando and commander of the firing squads that killed prisoners, was originally sentenced to death, but this was commuted by the Norwegian supreme court. He was deported to Germany on 10 December 1947.
- Josef Schlossmacher, Gestapo official in Trondheim, was incriminated on several aspects of the executions at Falstad, but charges against him were dropped.
- Julius Nielson, a Gestapo official who played an active role in capturing and sending prisoners to Falstad, was sentenced to death and executed in Trondheim on 10 July 1948.

== After the war ==
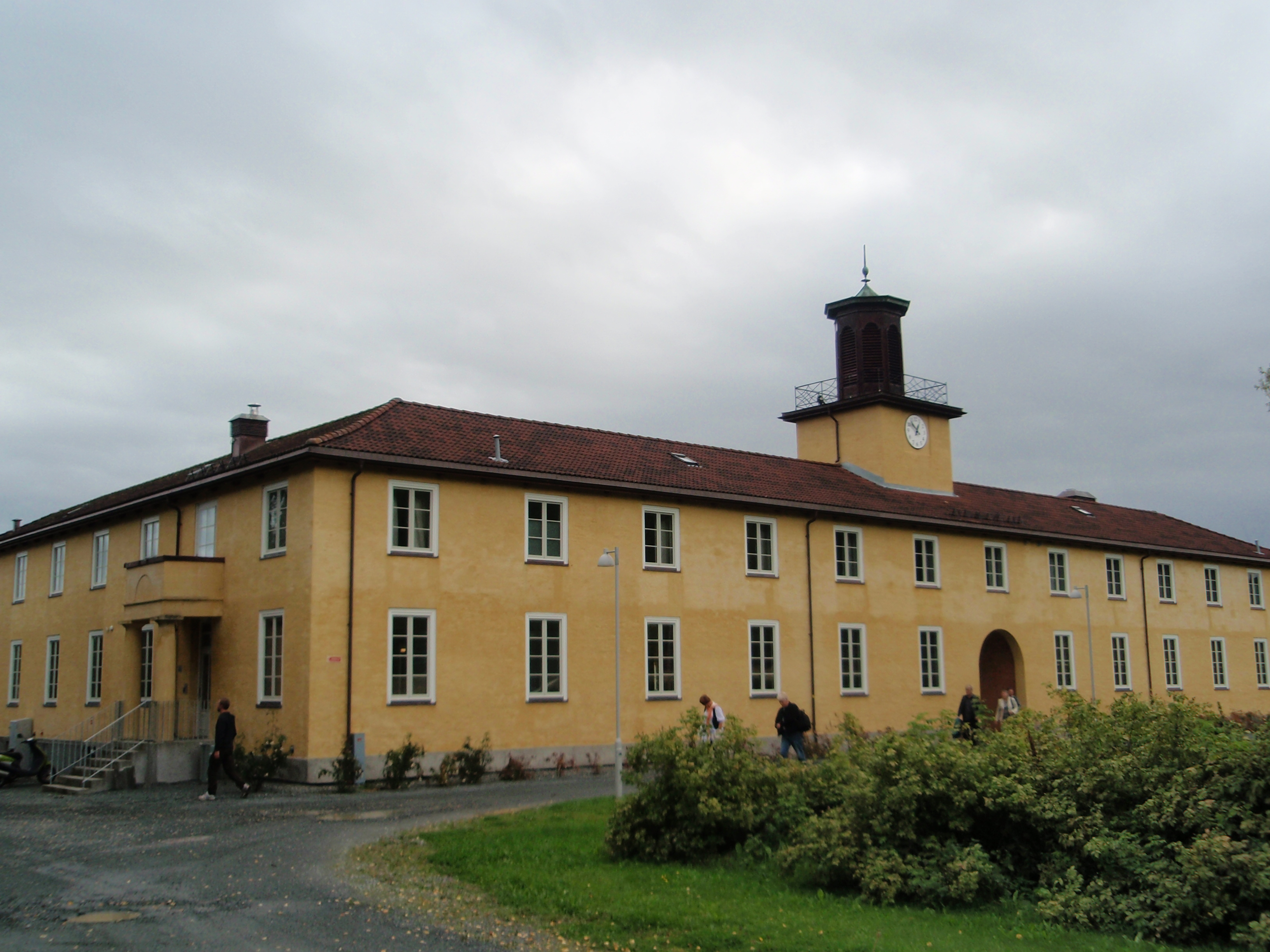
The main building of the Falstad complex

After the war the camp was used for prisoners close to the defeated Nazi rule, under the name Innherrad forced labour camp.

Between 1951 and 1992, the camp once again functioned as a school, this time for the mentally impaired. It went through a number of name changes during this time.

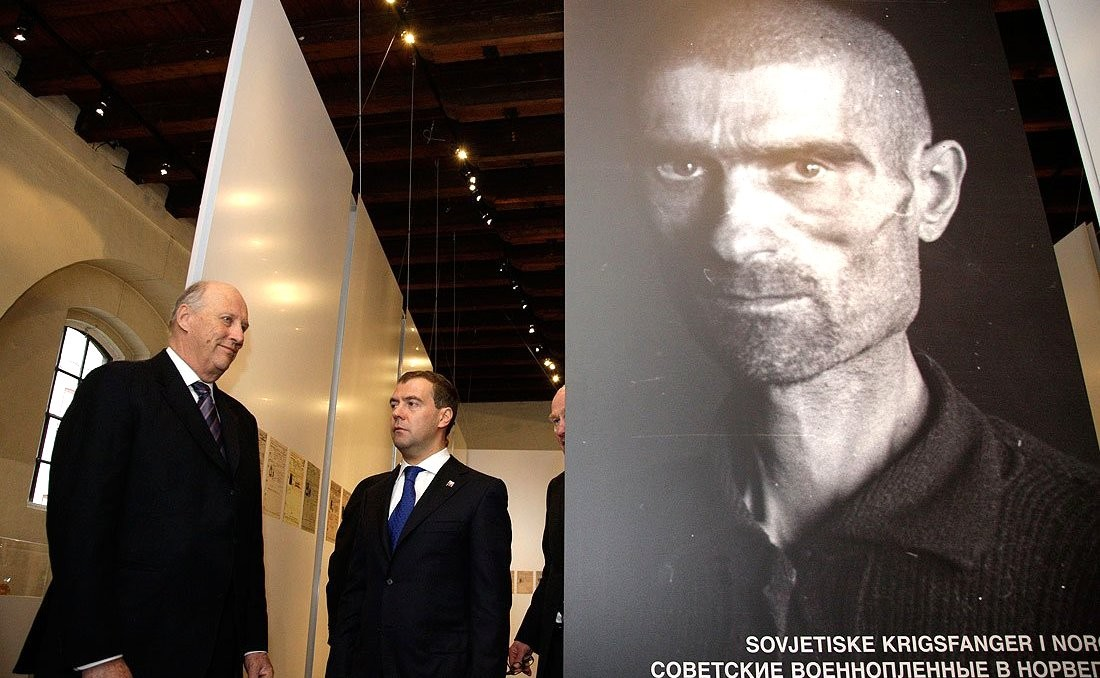
Dmitry Medvedev and Harald V on exhibition, 26 April 2010

In August 2000, Stiftelsen Falstadsenteret (transl. The Falstad Centre Foundation) was established as a "national centre for the education and documentation of the history of imprisonment in the Second World War, humanitarian international law and human rights."

== See also ==
- List of Nazi concentration camps
- German Resistance to Nazism
- Nazi concentration camps in Norway
