= Siem =

Siem is a surname. Notable people with the surname include:

- Charlie Siem (born 1986), British-Norwegian violinist
- Kjetil Siem (born 1960), Norwegian businessperson, journalist, author and sports official
- Kristian Siem (born 1949), Norwegian businessman
- Martin Siem (1915–1996), Norwegian businessperson
- Mary Alice Siem, American activist
- Ole Siem (1882–1979), Norwegian naval officer, businessman and politician
- Sasha Siem (born 1984), British-Norwegian singer-songwriter and composer
- Sunniva Siem (born 1969), Norwegian physicist

== See also ==
- Security information and event management
- Siems
- Sihem
