= Ringdal =

Ringdal is a Norwegian surname. Notable people with the surname include:

- Haakon Ringdal (born 1954), Norwegian businessman
- Nils Johan Ringdal (1952–2008), Norwegian author and historian
- Olav Ringdal (1921–1945), Norwegian resistance member
