= Acergy =

Former offshore engineering company

Acergy S.A.

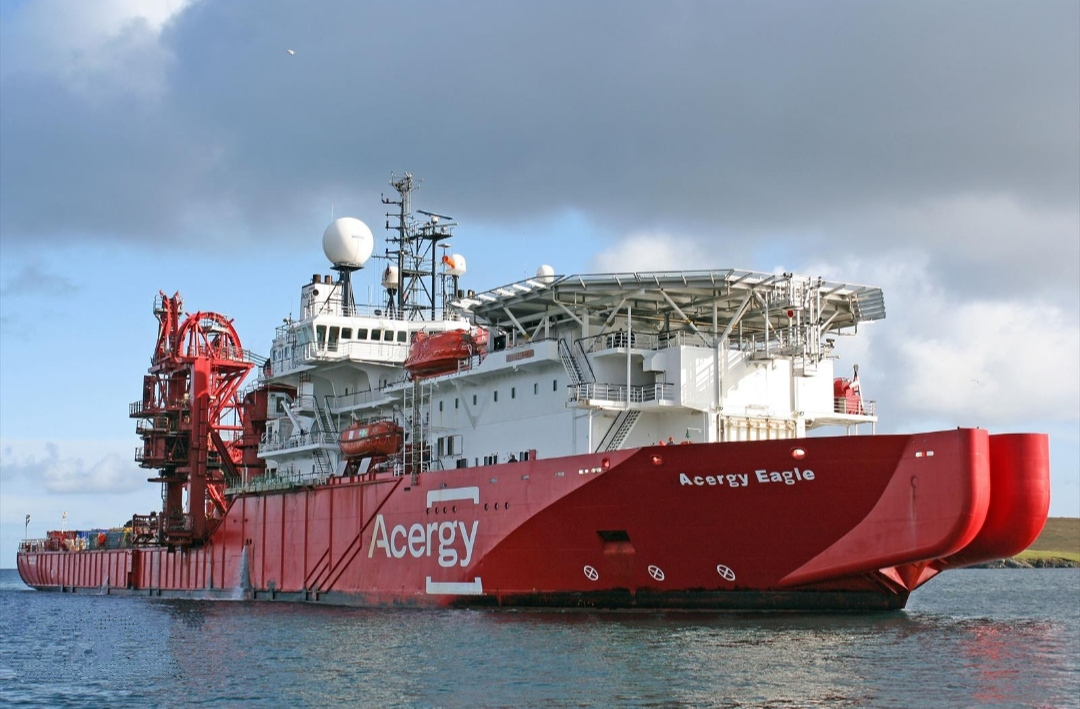
- Acergy ship at breaking yard
- Company type: Société Anonyme
- Industry: Petroleum
- Founded: 1970
- Defunct: January 2011
- Fate: Merged with Subsea 7
- Successor: Subsea 7
- Headquarters: Hammersmith, London, United Kingdom
- Key people: Jean Cahuzac (CEO), Sir Peter Mason (Chairman)
- Products: Offshore engineering and construction

Acergy S.A. was an international offshore seabed-to-surface engineering and construction company previously known as Stolt Offshore and Stolt Comex Seaway and was part of the Stolt-Nielsen Group until 2005. The company was registered in Luxembourg and had its headquarters in London in the United Kingdom as well as offices in Stavanger, Norway; Aberdeen, United Kingdom; Suresnes, France; Houston, United States; Rio de Janeiro, Brazil; Perth, Australia; St. John's, Canada and Singapore. The company was listed on the Oslo Stock Exchange and NASDAQ. In 2011 the firm merged with Cayman Islands-based Subsea 7, Inc. to create Subsea 7 S.A.

== History ==
The company started as the Haugesund-based Stolt Nielsen Seaway and offered divers for the exploration of the North Sea in 1970. The company was part of the Stolt-Nielsen Group. In 1989 the company expanded to Aberdeen and in 1992 it acquired the French diving company Comex Services. In 1997 the company won its first ultra-deepwater contract off West Africa, resulting in the acquisition of Houston-based Ceanic Corporation, Danish NKT Flexibles and ETPM of France.

In 2000, the company changed its name to Stolt Offshore. In 2005 the Stolt-Nielsen Group sold its ownership in the company and listed it on the Oslo Stock Exchange and NASDAQ. As of 1 March 2006, the company changed its name to Acergy.

On 21 June 2010 the combination of Acergy S.A. and Subsea 7 Inc. was announced and was completed on 7 January 2011. The new entity took the Subsea 7 name while retaining Acergy's Luxembourg domicile and operational headquarters in London. The chairman and chief executive roles were filled by Kristian Siem and Jean Cahuzac, who had previously held the same roles at Subsea 7 and Acergy respectively.

== Operations ==
The company had four main operational areas: Subsea Umbilical Risers and Flowlines (SURF); Inspection, Maintenance and Repair (IMR) and Conventional Field Development.

=== Joint ventures ===
Main Joint Ventures included: Seaway Heavy Lifting in Netherlands, NKT Flexibles in Denmark, SapuraAcergy in Malaysia, Global Oceon Engineers in Nigeria.

=== Assets ===
Ships: Acergy Condor, Acergy Discovery, Acergy Eagle, Acergy Falcon, Acergy Harrier, Acergy Hawk, Acergy Legend, Acergy Osprey, Acergy Petrel, Acergy Viking, Far Saga (time charter), Skandi Acergy (time charter), Pertinacia, Polar Queen, Polarbjørn (time charter), Sapura 3000 (owned by SapuraAcergy Joint Venture), Stanislav Yudin (owned by Seaway Heavy Lifting Joint Venture), Oleg Strashnov (newbuild, owned by Seaway Heavy Lifting Joint Venture), Acergy Havila (Newbuild), Acergy Borealis (newbuild), Seven Waves (newbuild 2013)

Barges: Acergy Polaris, Antares, Acergy Orion
