= Niels G. Stolt-Nielsen =

Norwegian business leader (born 1965)

Niels Gregers Stolt-Nielsen
- Born: January 23, 1965 (age 61)
- Occupation: Shipping company executive
- Years active: 1990 to present
- Known for: CEO of Stolt-Nielsen Limited

Niels G. Stolt-Nielsen (born January 23, 1965) is a Norwegian business leader. Since 1996 he has served as director of Stolt-Nielsen Limited (SNL), a company with principal operations in parcel tankers, bulk-liquid storage, tank containers and aquaculture. Since 2000 he has been the company's chief executive officer, taking over after his father, Jacob Stolt-Nielsen.

== Early life ==
Stolt-Nielsen earned a BS degree in Business and Finance from Hofstra University in 1990. He is a member of the Stolt-Nielsen family that owns a controlling interest in Stolt-Nielsen Limited, and he is a son of founder Jacob Stolt-Nielsen.

== Career ==
He joined Stolt-Nielsen Limited in 1990 beginning as a shipbroker in Greenwich, Connecticut and then as a round-voyage manager. In 1994 he opened and organized the company's representative office in Shanghai, China. In 2000 it was announced that he would replace his father as CEO of the company, after his father had served in the same position for 41 years. He has been known as a more conservative CEO than his father was. He served as interim chief executive officer of Stolt Offshore S.A. from September 2002 until March 2003. He held the position of chief executive officer of Stolt Sea Farm from 1996 until September 2001.

== Emigration issues ==
In 2001 Niels Stolt-Nielsen notified Norwegian authorities that he was living abroad having his residence in London and stopped paying taxes in Norway. The tax authorities contested this in 2001, however Stolt-Nielsen's assertion was accepted for the 2002 - 2004 tax years due to a clerical error. In 2005 the error was discovered and the authorities claimed Stolt-Nielsen owed taxes from 2001 to 2004, and for 2005, as well. The tax authorities were subsequently sued by Stolt-Nielsen and in a November 2007 it was ruled that Stolt-Nielsen had a permanent residence at Frogner in Oslo.

== Other positions ==
- Director of Stolt Offshore S.A. (until 2005)
- Interim CEO, Stolt Offshore S.A (September 2002 – March 2003)
- CEO, Stolt Sea Farm (1996 – September 2001)
