= NKT (disambiguation) =

NKT is the New Kadampa Tradition of Buddhism.

NKT may also refer to:

- NKT A/S, a Danish conglomerate
  - NKT Flexibles, its pipeline subsidiary
- Natural killer T cell, in biology
- Newmarket railway station, Melbourne
- Nihonkai Telecasting, a Japanese television channel
