= International Marine Contractors Association =

International trade association for the marine contracting industry

- Formation: 1972/1995
- Type: Trade Association
- Headquarters: 66 Buckingham Gate; London SW1E 6AU; United Kingdom
- Region served: Worldwide
- Members: 700+
- Key people: Iain Grainger (CEO); Jim Cullen (Technical Director)
- Website: www.imca-int.com

International Marine Contractors Association (IMCA) is a leading international trade association for the marine contracting industry. It is a not for profit organisation with members representing the majority of worldwide marine contractors in the oil and gas and renewable energy industries.

IMCA was formed following the merger of the Association of Offshore Diving Contractors (AODC) with the Dynamically Positioned Vessel Owners Association (DPVOA) in 1995.

== Overview ==
IMCA's purpose is to improve performance in the marine contracting industry.

IMCA represents over 700 member organisations in over 60 countries. It operates in five geographic regions: Asia-Pacific, North America, Europe & Africa, Middle East & India and South America). IMCA has a full-time secretariat in London that organises and manages the regional and technical committees. The extensive committee structure consists of elected member representatives who are experts in their field of operation.

As a trade association, IMCA is required to comply with international competition law and represents the industry on national and international forums, such as the International Maritime Organization. Members are obliged to comply with the IMCA Code of Conduct as a condition of membership. One of the commitments is to operate with risk as low as reasonably practicable (ALARP), and to minimise environmental impact.

== Publications and documents ==
IMCA has developed a comprehensive body of knowledge in the form of a suite of thousands of published guidance documents, technical information notes, DVDs and safety promotional materials which are internationally recognised as authoritative and establish standards of good practice in the marine contracting industry.

IMCA has published guidance documents in the following fields:

- Safety, Environment & Legislation
  - Safety flashes: Anonymised reports of accident, incidents, and near misses reported by members, and circulated to the interested public in the interest of improving safety. These reports may contain only the bare details, or a basic analysis, of what happened, depending on what was reported. As a general rule, no judgements are made nor blame suggested. The reader is left to learn what they can from information provided.
- Competence & Training
- Diving Division
  - IMCA D014 International Code of Practice for Offshore Diving
  - IMCA D022 The Diving Supervisor's Manual.
  - IMCA D024 Rev 2 - Part 2 DESIGN for Saturation (Bell) Diving Systems.
- Diving Medical Advisory Committee (DMAC)
- Marine Division & DPVOA
- Offshore Survey Division
- Remote Systems & Remotely operated vehicle Division

== Diving Certification ==
IMCA provides an internationally recognised certification scheme for three specialist diving disciplines:

- Air Diving Supervisors.
- Bell Diving Supervisors.
- Life Support Technicians.

IMCA recognises some diver training certificates for surface oriented and closed bell offshore diving under the IMCA international code of practice for regions where there are no relevant regulatory systems. These certificates are listed in the current IMCA Briefing Note. IMCA does not approve or recognise specific diver training schools or courses.

== Events ==
IMCA organises an annual programme of meetings and events all over the world, including regional meetings, briefing sessions, technical seminars and workshops on specific industry related issues. The Association's flagship event takes place every two years with an agenda combining business and strategic issues featuring senior executives and technical sessions. IMCA also supports a number of conferences and exhibitions hosted by other organisations which share a common interest of its members.

== History ==
- 1972 - Association of Offshore Diving Contractors AODC founded.
- 1990 - Dynamically Positioned Vessel Owners Association DPVOA, and AODC Middle East Section founded.
- 1995 - AODC and DPVOA merged to form IMCA.
- 1997 - Offshore Survey Division formed.
- 1999 - Observer status granted at the International Maritime Organization.
- 1999 - IMCA Asia-Pacific Section founded.
- 2000 - Middle East Section extended to include India.
- 2002 - Americas Deepwater Section founded (later to become Central & North America Section).
- 2003 - Europe & Africa Section founded.
- 2009 - South America Section founded.

=== Past IMCA Presidents ===
- 2022–present: Jonathan Tame, Subsea7.
- 2020-2022: Pieter Heerema, Allseas.
- 2018-2020: Iain Grainger, McDermott International.
- 2017-2018: Harke Jan Meek, Heerema Marine Contractors.
- 2015–2016: Bruno Faure, Technip.
- 2013-2014: Massimo Fontolan, Saipem.
- 2011-2012: Andy Woolgar, Subsea7.
- 2009-2010: Johan Rasmussen, Acergy.
- 2007-2008: Knut Boe, Technip.
- 2005-2006: Frits Janmaat, Allseas Group.
- 2003-2004: Steve Preston, Heerema Marine Contractors.
- 2001-2002: John Smith, Halliburton Subsea/Subsea7.
- 1999-2000: Donald Carmichael, Coflexip Stena Offshore.
- 1997-1998: Hein Mulder, Heerema Marine Contractors.
- 1995-1996: Derek Leach, Coflexip Stena Offshore.
