= Rexonics =

Rexonics AG
- Company type: Private company
- Industry: Oil and gas
- Founded: 2009; 16 years ago
- Headquarters: Wil, Canton of St. Gallen, Switzerland
- Area served: Worldwide
- Products: Ultrasonic oil well stimulation
- Website: www.rexonics.com

Rexonics is Swiss company that provides a high-power ultrasound technology for commercial oil well stimulation. Rexonics technology makes the oil recovery process more efficient and less cost-intensive with no environmental risks.

== History ==
In 2008, Ogsonic AG was founded as a spin-off of an industrial ultrasonic application provider to focus on the development and production of ultrasonic system for the oil and gas industry.

In 2009, first oil well stimulation was completed in Mexico and Romania showing it was possible to increase oil production.

In 2013, to increase the commercialization of the Rexonics technology, Rexonic AG was formed through a joint venture between Rex International Holding and Ogsonic AG.

In 2016, Rex International Holding pared down its stake to 50% from 66.67% to Ogsonic.

== Technology ==
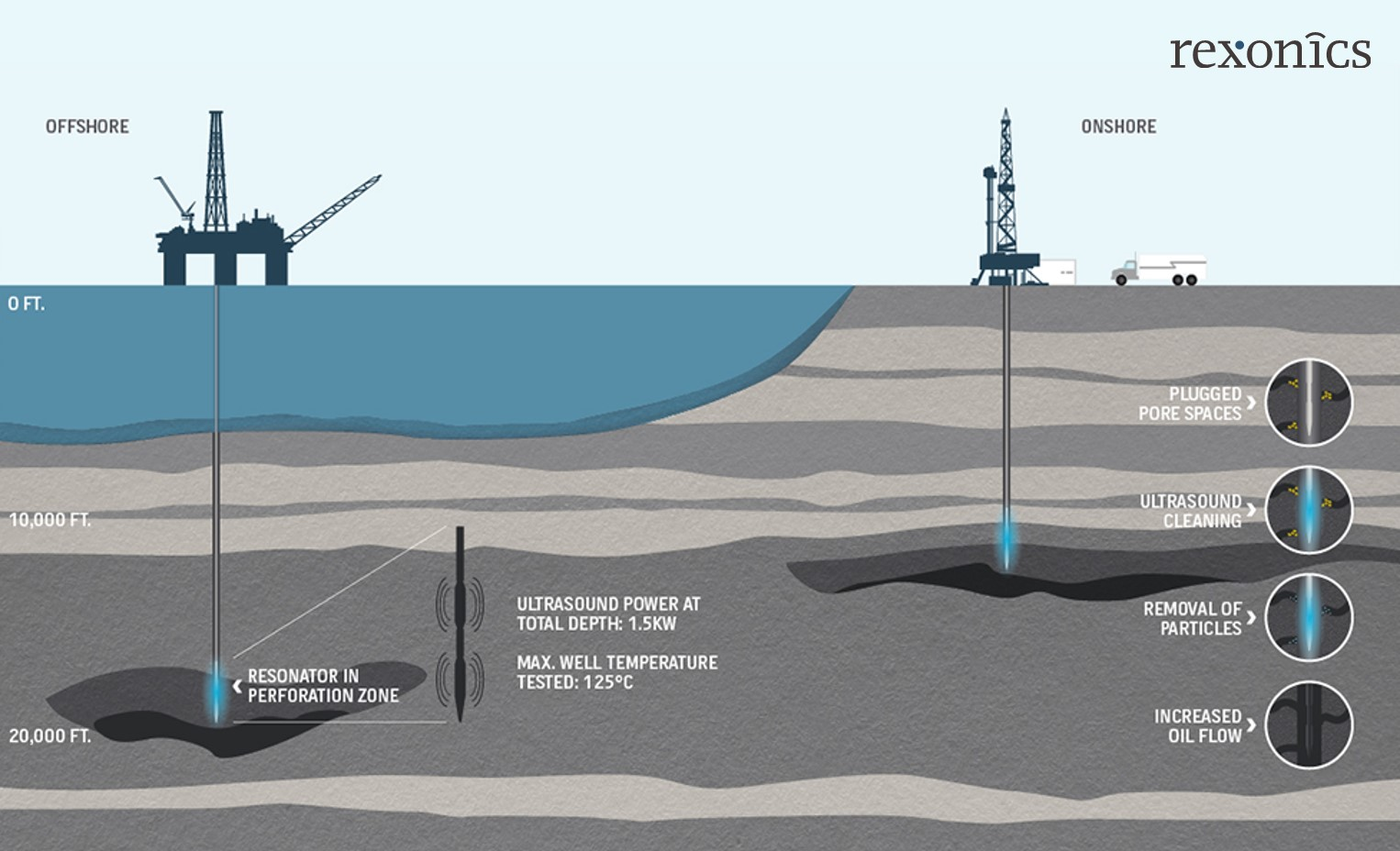
Rexonics

The Rexonics technology is a high powered ultrasonic tool used to stimulate onshore and offshore wells. The proprietary and patented technology is designed to clean the production well bore of typical oil production inhibitors such as wax, paraffin and salt deposits.
