= Jacob Stolt-Nielsen =

Norwegian businessman (1931–2015)

Jacob Stolt-Nielsen Jr.
- Born: May 12, 1931; Haugesund, Norway
- Died: February 15, 2015 (aged 83); Oslo, Norway
- Occupation: Shipping Magnate: Founder of Stolt-Nielsen S.A. (1959)
- Spouse: Nadia
- Children: 4

Jacob Stolt-Nielsen Jr. (12 May 1931 – 15 February 2015) was a Norwegian entrepreneur. The founder of Stolt-Nielsen Limited, he is widely credited as the creator of the parcel tanker concept. He also pioneered and built successful businesses in tank containers, offshore oilfield services and aquaculture. He served as a director on the board of Stolt-Nielsen Limited, where his son, Niels Gregers Stolt-Nielsen, is chief executive officer.

== Biography ==
After a few years as shipping trainee, Stolt-Nielsen, worked as a shipbroker in New York. There, he was briefly associated with Charles Steuber Sr., at whose house he was married in 1957, and the two conceived of the idea for a new pump and pipeline system for tank ships which would permit a tanker to safely segregate multiple grades of dangerous chemicals, after first converting the MT Freddy. The brief business association between the two was short-lived because of divergent priorities. Based on the new design, Stolt-Nielsen started his own company, Parcel Tankers Inc, Liberia, in 1959. His ships were called parcel tankers and the trade became known as the Parcel Trade. The company grew very fast and is still today the largest owner and operator of parcel tankers in the world, now operating a fleet of about 150 ships ranging in size from 450 to 45,000 dwt. The business is to run parcel tankers in regular, scheduled liner service, transporting as many as 20/25 parcels of different liquid chemicals on each ship. The company operates such services all over the world.

In 1972, Stolt-Nielsen started Sea Farm A/S in Norway for the production of salmon smolt. The company was subsequently renamed Stolt Sea Farm Ltd. (SSF) and grew to become the third largest salmon producer in the world. The salmon business was sold in 2006, with SSF retaining the turbot, caviar and sturgeon businesses. SSF has since also added sole to the menu.

Stolt-Nielsen expanded into another new business in 1974, when he created Stolt-Nielsen Seaway A/S to provide sub-sea construction services for offshore petroleum exploration and production in the North Sea. After the acquisition of Comex Services, the company was renamed Stolt Comex Seaway. In 1999 and 2000 the company acquired Ceanic Inc. and the French sub-sea contractor E.T.P.M., and was renamed Stolt Offshore S.A. The company was sold in 2006, renamed Acergy, and is now part of Subsea 7.

Stolt-Nielsen had also set his sight on the terminal business as a natural complement to the tanker business. He acquired his first storage terminal in the 1970s. Today, Stolthaven Terminals operates four owned and five joint-venture terminals, providing storage for chemicals and other speciality products in key markets worldwide with a total capacity of 4 million m3 when present construction completed.

In 1982, another industry caught Stolt-Nielsen's attention. Stolt Tank Containers was established after the purchase of United Tank Containers. Starting out with only 400 tank containers, STC is today the world’s largest provider of door-to-door transportation services for bulk-liquid chemicals and food-grade products, with the total count of containers approaching 30,000.

In 2000, after 41 years as head of the company, Stolt-Nielsen retired as chief executive officer and handed over the reins as CEO to his son, Niels Gregers, who continues as CEO of Stolt-Nielsen Limited today.

Stolt-Nielsen is known for his long history of friendship with Filipino seafarers. His relationship with Captain Gregorio Oca led to the creation of the Philippines’ biggest union of seafarers and the extensive training of Filipino seafarers in chemical tankers owned by Stolt-Nielsen. Classrooms and medical/hospital facilities were donated by Stolt-Nielsen for Filipino seafarers and their families.

In January 2003, Solt-Nielsen S.A. voluntarily entered The United States Department of Justice (DOJ) amnesty program, amid claims of anticompetitive activity and industry collusion. After penalties were handed down to two competitors, the DOJ then rescinded Stolt-Nielsen’s amnesty and notified Niels G. Stolt-Nielsen and Jacob Stolt-Nielsen that they were targets of his action. A trial in 2005 ruled unanimously in favour of Stolt-Nielsen and its executives. In December 2007, the DOJ announced that it would not appeal the decision. “Thus ended the worst episode in the history of Stolt-Nielsen,” wrote Stolt-Nielsen in the company’s 2007 annual report. “The struggle took a great toll. The cost in money – more than $150 million – was bad. The cost in grey hair and stress was worse… We proved the hard way that justice can be had in the U.S. if you have deep pockets and the nerve to fight. I am glad it is over.”

On 15 December 2009, the 50th anniversary of the founding of the company, Jacob Stolt-Nielsen stepped down as chairman of the board. He remained a director of the company. Writing in the company’s 2009 annual report, he said: “This is my last Chairman’s Statement for the annual report. After 50 years in the chair it is time to leave the tiller to someone else… As I now take my place among the other directors, I do so with utmost confidence in Christer Olsson (Chairman), Niels Stolt-Nielsen, our Chief Executive Officer, and the outstanding management and personnel of Stolt-Nielsen S.A. worldwide.”

In 2011, Stolt-Nielsen suggested that captured pirates should be executed and their boats sunk, the historical response to piracy, as an effective solution to the problem of piracy around the Horn of Africa. He was criticised by Norway's Foreign Ministry's state secretary, who said that "human rights" apply even to pirates.

== Family ==
Jacob Stolt-Nielsen and his wife of more than 50 years, Nadia, have four children: Siri, Lise, Jacob B. and Niels. Jacob B. Stolt-Nielsen currently serves as a director of Stolt-Nielsen Limited, having previously held a number of management positions in the company. The Stolt-Nielsen’s two daughters are not active in the company.

== Awards and honors ==
Jacob Stolt-Nielsen has received recognition from a number of organizations for his achievements:

- 1991; Connecticut Maritime Association – Commodore Award
- 1993; Norwegian-American Chamber of Commerce – Achievement Award
- 1993; Babson College – inducted into the Academy of Distinguished Entrepreneurs Hall of Fame
- 2001; Norwegian-American Chamber of Commerce, Louisiana Chapter – Image Award
- 2002; Inducted into the International Maritime Hall of Fame
- 2006; Philippines Government – Outstanding Shipping Executive Award
- 2008; John B. Lacson Foundation Maritime University – Doctor of Maritime Science Honoris Causa

Publication: Biography by Kristian Ilner, “Jacob Stolt-Nielsen, an entrepreneur” published by Vigmostad Bjørke 2009
