= Common Marine Inspection Document =

The Common Marine Inspection Document (CMID) (IMCA M 149) is a free to use marine inspection format provided by the International Marine Contractors Association for the inspection and audit of marine vessels involved in the offshore industry. The inspection's purpose is to establish that a particular vessel is safe to work aboard, will not place anybody working on or around the vessel in danger and will not cause any harm to the environment. The inspection also ensures that all mandatory certification for the vessel and its operations are up to date.

The inspection contains 17 sections including:

- Vessel Particulars
- Index of Certificates
- HSE (Health, Safety & Environment)
- Crew Management
- Pollution Prevention

The eCMID is currently on Issue 11, it is an online database, which allows the electronic completion of CMID reports and manages storage and access of these inspections was released by IMCA.

In April 2013, IMCA reworked the Marine Inspection Checklist for Small Workboats (IMCA M 189) renaming it as the Marine inspection for Small Workboats (Common Marine Inspection Document for Small Workboats) and changing the formatting of sections of the document, to make it compatible with the IMCA eCMID Database
