= Sihem =

Sihem is a feminine given name of Arabic origin. Notable people with the name include:

== Given name ==
- Sihem Amer-Yahia, Algerian computer scientist
- Sihem Aouini (born 1982), Tunisian team handball player
- Sihem Badi (born 1967), Tunisian politician
- Sihem Bensedrine (born 1950), Tunisian journalist and human rights activist
- Sihem Boughdiri (born 1965), Tunisian banker and politician
- Sihem Habchi (born 1975), French feminist of Algerian descent
- Sihem Hemissi, (born 1985) is an Algerian team handball player

== See also ==
- Siem
- Siemens
