= Stolt =

Stolt is a surname. Notable people with the surname include:

- Roine Stolt (born 1956), Swedish guitarist, vocalist, and composer
- William Alex Stolt (1900–2001), American mayor

== See also ==
- Jacob Stolt-Nielsen (1931–2015), Norwegian businessman
