= Sasha Siem =

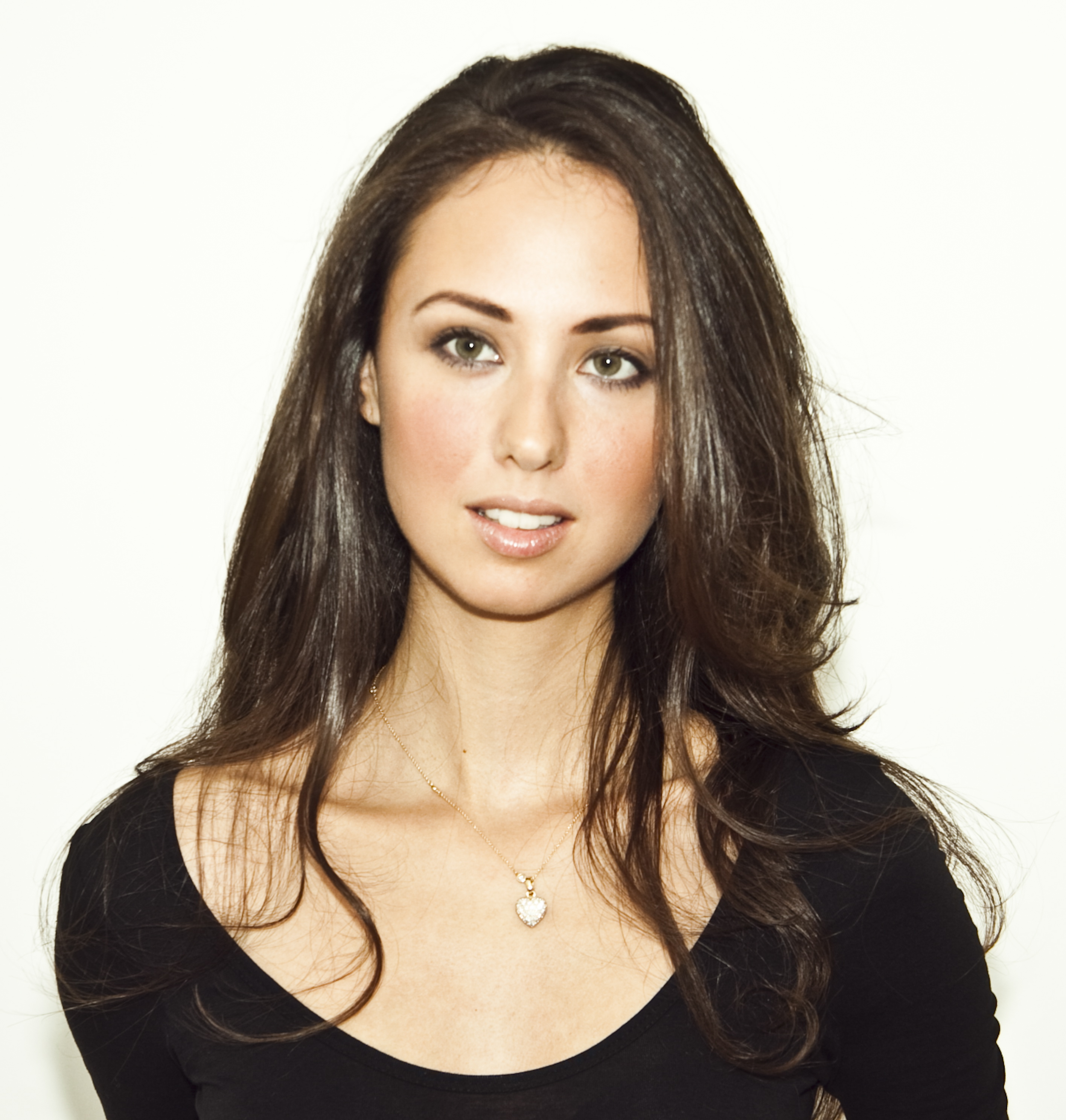
- Sasha Siem (2010)

Background information
- Born: Sasha Kathrine Siem; 1984 (age 40–41); London, England
- Years active: 2008–present
- Website: sashasiem.com

Sasha Kathrine Siem (born 1984, in London) is a British-Norwegian singer-songwriter and composer.

== Early life ==
Sasha Siem was born in London, England, to Kristian Siem, a Norwegian businessman, and his South African wife Karen Ann, née Moross. Her brother is violinist Charlie Siem.

== Career ==
Siem studied music and poetry at Girton College, Cambridge, where she was awarded a BA and MPhil, and Harvard University. By her early twenties, she had written music for the London Symphony Orchestra, The Royal Opera House, Rambert Dance Company, Opera North, The Aldeburgh Festival, Le Nouvel Ensemble Moderne, The London Sinfonietta, and the London Philharmonic Orchestra.

In 2010, she became one of the youngest people to win a British Composer Award. She has also been awarded the Arthur Bliss Prize and the Royal Philharmonic Society Composition Prize.

Siem has performed at festivals and venues across Europe and the United States, including The Royal Opera House, London; HBC, Berlin; the Ultima Oslo Contemporary Music Festival; (Le) Poisson Rouge, NYC; by:Larm, Joe's Pub, The Forum, London, Latitude Festival by:Larm, Barbican, Southbank Centre and Sadlers Wells.

While parallels have been drawn with pioneering singer-songwriters such as Tom Waits, Jacques Brel, Björk, and Joanna Newsom, the influence of art-song composers such as György Kurtág, Claude Vivier, and Salvatore Sciarrino is equally evident in her music.

The Guardian noted that Siem is "making waves in the music scene", while the Times said "she is clearly a gifted musician".

Siem released her debut EP So Polite on 1 February 2013. Her debut album Most Of The Boys was produced by Valgeir Sigurðsson in Iceland and was released on 2 March 2015 on vinyl and CD. It was reviewed in Uncut by Jim Wirth, who described the album as "An uptown fusion of Bjork, The Raincoats and the Cosmopolitan letters page".

Talking about Siem's single, "My Friend", Tarynn Law from The 405 said, "gorgeous and emotive work, with lyrics that allow for self-reflection". Jamie Skey from Q said, "...if you were to construct a Venn Diagram between Bjork and Leonard Cohen, you’d find the tune somewhere in the shaded middle section. Robin Murray from Clash said, “sweeping, widescreen grandeur… both contagious and quite, quite affecting”.

In 2016, Siem released her second album Bird Burning to critical acclaim. Pip Williams at The Line of Best Fit wrote: "Bird Burning is a spectacular record on several levels, successfully tackling concepts other artists would rightly shy from. Scandinavia regularly yields musicians of extraordinary talent, but Sasha Siem’s startling ambition stands Bird Burning head and shoulders above the rest."

Siem’s songs have been remixed by Matthew Herbert, Susanne Sundfor, High as a Kite, East India Youth, and Rabit.

She is also known by her pseudonym Frigga and has released two albums under this name: A Gathering in 2022 and A Lost Mosaic in 2025. Her 2018 song Do You Really Wanna Be in Love also gained popularity.
