= Haakon Ringdal =

Norwegian businessman

Haakon Ringdal (born 1954) is a Norwegian businessman, since 2009 CEO of Odfjell.

He worked for Jo Tankers from 1989 to 1995, in Gearbulk from 1995 to 2001 and as CFO of Odfjell from 2001. He succeeds Terje Storeng as CEO on 3 May 2009.
