= NKT Flexibles =

Danish pipeline manufacturer

- Company type: Subsidiary
- Industry: Oilfield equipment; Chemical industry equipment
- Founded: 1999; 27 years ago
- Founder: NKT Cables
- Headquarters: Brøndby, Denmark
- Owners: NKT (51%: 1999-2012); Subsea 7 (49%; 1999-2012)
- Parent: NOV Inc. (2012-present)

NKT Flexibles is a supplier of flexible pipelines for the offshore and chemical industries based in Denmark. NKT Flexibles was acquired by the Houston, Texas-based company National Oilwell Varco (renamed NOV Inc. in 2021) in 2012 for 3.8 billion kr.. The company was formed in 1999 when it was split off from NKT Cables to form a joint venture between NKT (51%) and Subsea 7 S.A. (49%). It has production facilities in Kalundborg, Denmark and offices in Brøndby, Denmark.

The company produces dynamic and static risers, static flowlines, subsea and topside jumpers, and expansion joints for use in the offshore oil and gas industry. The NKT flexible pipe is an unbonded structure consisting of helically wound metallic armour wires or tapes combined with concentric layers of polymers, textiles, fabric strips and lubricants.

In May 2011, the company announced its second frame agreement with Brazil oil company Petrobras. The agreement, worth up to 9.7 billion kr., included the establishment of a Brazilian production facility located in the Acu Superport.
