= Charlie Siem =

British violinist (born 1986)

- Siem

Background information
- Born: Charles Maximilian Siem; 14 January 1986 (age 40); London, England
- Genres: Classical
- Occupation: Violinist
- Instrument: Violin
- Years active: 2001–present
- Label: Naxos Classics, Signum Classics, Sony Classics, Warner Classics

Charles Maximilian Siem (born 14 January 1986) is an English contemporary classical violinist.

== Life and career ==
Charlie Siem was born in London, England, to Karen Ann (Moross) and Kristian Siem, a billionaire. His father is Norwegian. His mother is South African, and is Jewish; her family was originally from Lithuania and Ukraine. He has three sisters, all involved in arts: musician and composer Sasha Siem, visual artist and healing arts/yoga teacher Sophie Madeleine Siem, and artist and model Louisa Tatiana Kristianne Siem.

Siem began the study of violin at age three when his interest was piqued upon hearing the cassettes his mother used to play for her children. He went on to study at Eton College and Girton College, Cambridge, and continued his violin studies with Itzhak Rashkovsky and Shlomo Mintz. He performed his first concerto with an orchestra at age 15, and played with the Royal Philharmonic Orchestra at age 18. He has played alongside artists such as The Who and Miley Cyrus.

Siem is distantly related to Norwegian violin virtuoso and composer Ole Bull.

He plays a violin made by Guarneri del Gesu from 1735, also known as "The d'Egville". The violin was previously owned by Yehudi Menuhin.

He is married to Countess Viola Arrivabene Valenti Gonzaga, first daughter of Count Giberto Arrivabene Valenti Gonzaga and Princess Bianca of Savoy-Aosta (daughter of Princess Claude of Orléans and Duke Amedeo of Aosta).

== Reviews ==
- "Siem also had the deep heart and soul required to make the music sing, in a great romantic combination of drama, passion and tenderness."
- "Under the Stars" Album of the week on Classic FM "A very attractive selection of favourites, performed with the violinist's trademark grace and intimacy."
- Gramophone, "Charlie Siem, allowing his tone to soar in a great arch, creates a memorable high-point."
- "These performances show that his music-making is more than capable of speaking for itself without any kind of special pleading." The Guardian
- "There was a dumbfounding gap between his retro suavity and the ineptitude of his playing. His intonation, passagework and tone were simply ugly in two works that are stale enough when played well....Mr. Siem teetered on the edge of charm but saved himself with the frigid calculation of his phrasing." The New York Times
- "...Charlie Siem completely broke people's prejudices with his performance, proving himself through his music and demonstrating the charm of 'the most exciting young violinist in the contemporary music world' on the stage of Beijing Concert Hall. Charlie presented the Beijing audience with masterpieces and sonatas such as Violin Sonata No. 9 "Kreutzer" by Beethoven, Violin Sonata No. 3 by Grieg, Zigeunerweisen by Sarasate and more....His performance was a consummate display of skill. He captivated the audience with his extremely impressive playing, calm stage presence, handsome appearance and astonishing technique." China Art News

== Discography ==
Charlie Siem has released CDs through the years:

- Charlie Siem – Elgar & Grieg (Sonatas for Violin and Piano) - Andrei Korobeinikov - Challenge Classics
- Charlie Siem – Violin Virtuoso - Warner Classics
- Charlie Siem – Bruch, Wieniawski, Ole Bull – London Symphony Orchestra – Andrew Gourlay - Warner Classics
- Charlie Siem – Tony Banks: six pieces for orchestra - The City of Prague Philharmonic Orchestra - Martin Robertson - Paul Englishby - Naxos Classics
- Charlie Siem – Under The Stars – Münchner Rundfunkorchester – Paul Goodwin - Sony Classics
- Charlie Siem – Midnight Garden - Paravox Classics
- Charlie Siem – Between the Clouds - Itamar Golan - Signum Classics
- Charlie Siem – Beethoven Violin Concerto And 2 Romances - Philharmonia Orchestra – Oleg Caetani - Signum Classics
- Charlie Siem – Brahms Violin Concerto And Enescu Violin Works - Philharmonia Orchestra – Oleg Caetani - Signum Classics
