= Siems =

Siems is a surname. Notable people with the surname include:

- Christa Siems (1916–1990), German film and television actress
- Margarethe Siems (1879–1952), German operatic soprano and voice teacher
- Ruth Siems (1931–2005), American home economist
- Thomas F. Siems, American economist

== See also ==
- Siem
