= Sihem Amer-Yahia =

Algerian computer scientist

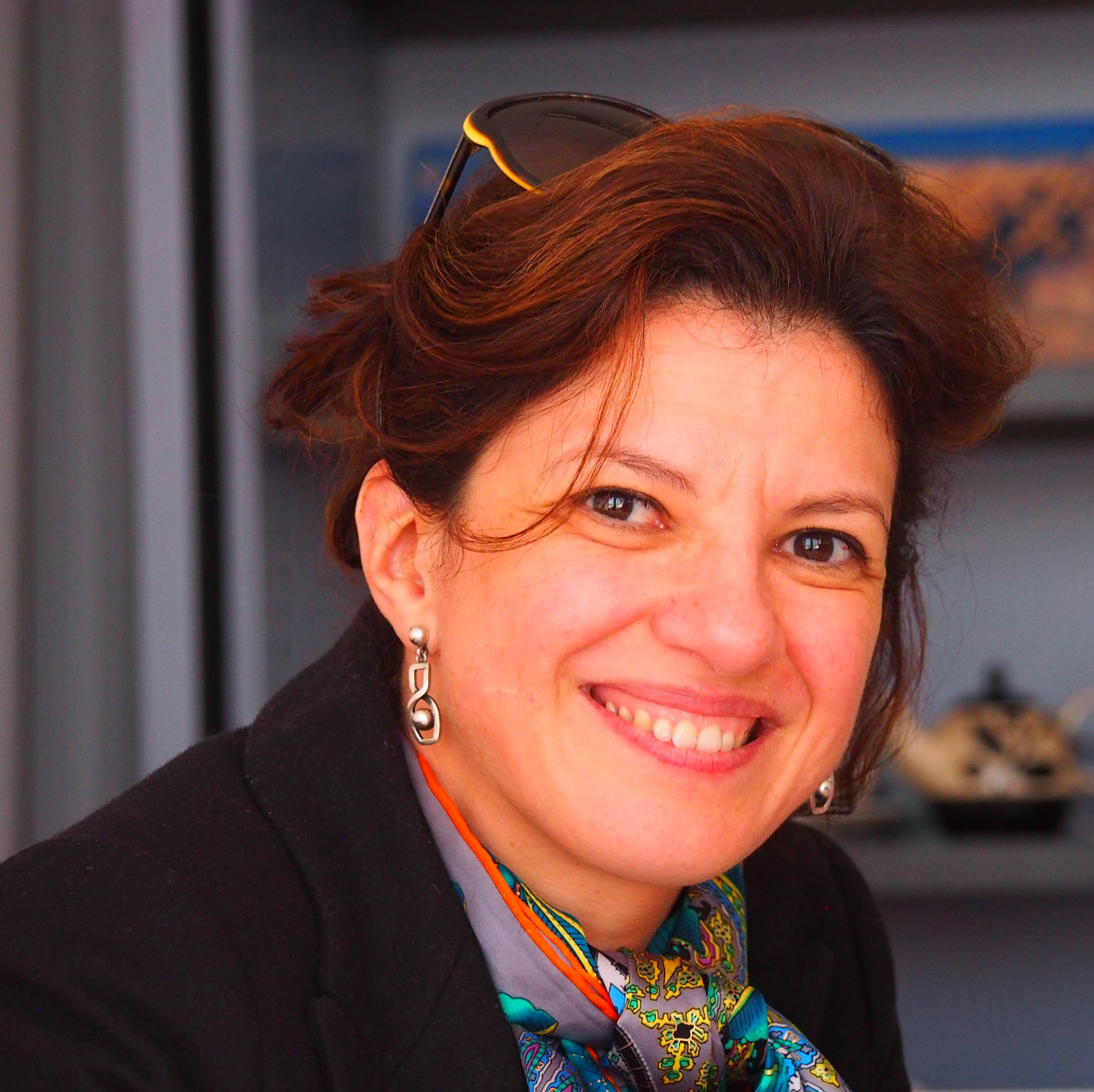
- Education: INRIA
- Awards: CNRS Silver Medal (2020); Association for Computing Machinery Distinguished Member (2017)
- Scientific career
- Fields: Computer science
- Workplaces: CNRS, University of Grenoble Alpes

Sihem Amer-Yahia is an Algerian-French-American computer scientist. She is a CNRS Research Director at the Laboratoire d’Informatique de Grenoble. She leads the SLIDE research team. Sihem Amer-Yahia works on data management, declarative languages and query processing algorithms. Her publication topics include crowdsourcing, computational complexity, data analysis, data handling, data visualisation, information science, and addresses new data management problems in emerging internet and big data applications.

== Early life and education ==
Amer-Yahia received her Ph.D. in CS from Paris-Orsay and INRIA in 1999, and her Diplôme d’Ingénieur from INI, Algeria.

== Career ==
Before joining CNRS, Amer-Yahia served as a principal scientist at QCRI, senior scientist at Yahoo! Research and member of technical staff at AT&T Labs.

Amer-Yahia served on several journal boards including the SIGMOD Executive Committee. She is one of the trustees emeriti of the VLDB Endowment.

Amer-Yahia also served on the EDBT (Extending Database Technology) board, and was the program committee chair of the EDBT conference in 2014. She is the editor-in-chief of the VLDB Journal for Europe and Africa.

She was an associate editor of ACM TODS, her term ending in 2017, and she has been an area editor for the Information Systems Journal.

== Awards and honours ==
In 2024, Amer-Yahia received the VLDB Endowment Women in Database Research Award.

In 2024, Amer-Yahia received the ACM SIGMOD Contributions Award for her contributions towards diversity, equity, and inclusion in the professional database research community.

In 2024, Amer-Yahia received the IEEE TCDE Impact Award.

In 2020, Amer-Yahia received the CNRS Silver Medal.

In 2017, Amer-Yahia was recognized as an ACM Distinguished Member.
