= JO Tankers =

Jo Tankers, based in Norway, was one of the world's main providers of deep-sea transportation services for chemicals and other high value liquids.

Since 1915 Odfjell family in Bergen were involved in shipping. They started with the transport of timber. As a consequence the Jo Tankers' vessels named after trees. In the 1930s the first tanker was built and in the 1950s they entered the chemical tanker trade. Jo Tankers have operated a fleet with chemical tankers up to 40,000 tonnes deadweight (DWT).

Jo Tankers has been acquired by Stolt-Nielsen in 2016. Stolt-Nielsen has over time painted the ships from the orange color into the Stolt-Nielsen colors. As the Jo Tankers fleet consisted out of a number of early 1990s tankers, a number of Jo Tankers ships have been beached and dismantled. Ships aging above 25 years are considered too old for most major oil compagnies to be accepted as charter.
