= Peter Mason (businessman) =

English businessman (1946–2024)

Sir Peter James Mason, KBE (9 September 1946 – 11 November 2024) was a British businessman who was chairman of Thames Water and senior non-executive director of BAE Systems.

Mason was previously Chief Executive of AMEC. He also held senior positions at Balfour Beatty, BICC and Norwest Holst. Mason was later chairman of Kemble Water Holdings Ltd.

Mason died on 11 November 2024, at the age of 78.
