= Subsea 7 =

Luxembourgish-domiciled subsea engineering, construction, and services company

Subsea 7 S.A.

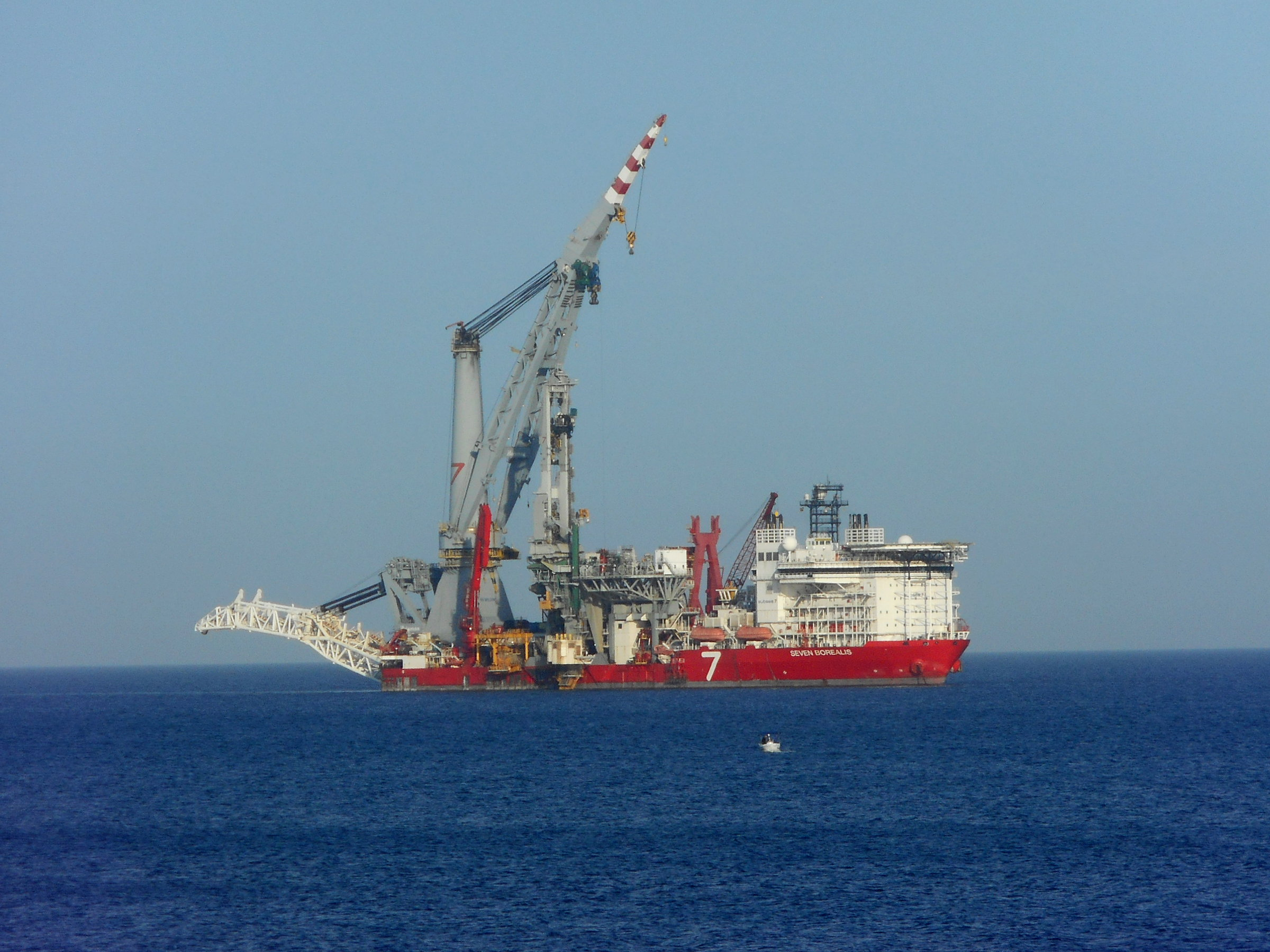
- Seven Borealis pipelay and heavy lift vessel at anchor off Limassol, Cyprus.
- Company type: Société Anonyme
- Traded as: OSE: SUBC
- Industry: Engineering
- Predecessor: Acergy S.A. Subsea 7, Inc
- Founded: 2002
- Headquarters: Sutton, Greater London, United Kingdom
- Area served: Worldwide
- Key people: Kristian Siem (Chairman), John Evans (CEO)
- Services: Offshore engineering, construction, and project management for the energy industry
- Revenue: ▲US $6.297 billion (2013)
- Operating income: ▼US $573.4 million (2013)
- Net income: ▼US $439.9 million (2013)
- Total assets: ▲US $10.357 billion (2013)
- Total equity: ▲US $6.612 billion (2013)
- Number of employees: 9,800 (2015)
- Subsidiaries: 4Subsea; Seaway 7; Xodus Group
- Website: www.subsea7.com

Subsea 7 S.A. (stylised as Subsea7) is a Luxembourgish multinational services company involved in subsea engineering and construction serving the offshore energy industry. The company is registered in Luxembourg with its headquarters in London. Subsea 7 delivers offshore projects and provides services for the energy industry.

Subsea7 makes offshore energy transition feasible through working on lower-carbon oil and gas and by providing services for the growth of renewables and other emerging energy industries.

== History ==
The company was formed by the January 2011 merger of two predecessor companies, Acergy S.A. and Subsea 7, Inc.

Acergy was founded in 1970 as Stolt Nielsen Seaway, a division of the Norwegian Stolt-Nielsen Group offering divers for the exploration of the North Sea. After a series of acquisitions, including Comex Services of France in 1992 and Houston, Texas–based Ceanic Corporation in 1998, the company changed its name to Stolt Offshore in 2000. Five years later Stolt-Nielsen spun out the company as an independent business listed on the Oslo Stock Exchange and NASDAQ. The firm renamed as Acergy in March 2006.

Subsea 7, Inc. was the result of a series of mergers between DSND Offshore AS, Halliburton Subsea, Subsea Offshore and Rockwater over an extended period, with Rockwater and SubSea merging in 1999 to form Halliburton Subsea, and the resulting company operating as a 50/50 joint venture with DSND in 2002 with the name Subsea 7. Halliburton exited the joint venture in November 2004. The company was listed on the Oslo Stock Exchange in August 2005 following its restructuring the same year.

On 21 June 2010 the combination of Acergy S.A. and Subsea 7 Inc. was announced and was completed on 7 January 2011. The new entity took the Subsea 7 name while retaining Acergy's Luxembourg domicile and operational headquarters in London. The chairman and chief executive roles were filled by Kristian Siem and Jean Cahuzac, who had previously held the same roles at Subsea 7 and Acergy respectively.

On 24 July 2025 the signing of Subsea7 and Saipem merger agreement was announced. The new entity will take the name Saipem7. Saipem7 will remain incorporated in Italy and headquartered in Milan, and will have its shares listed on both the Milan and Oslo stock exchanges.

== Presence ==
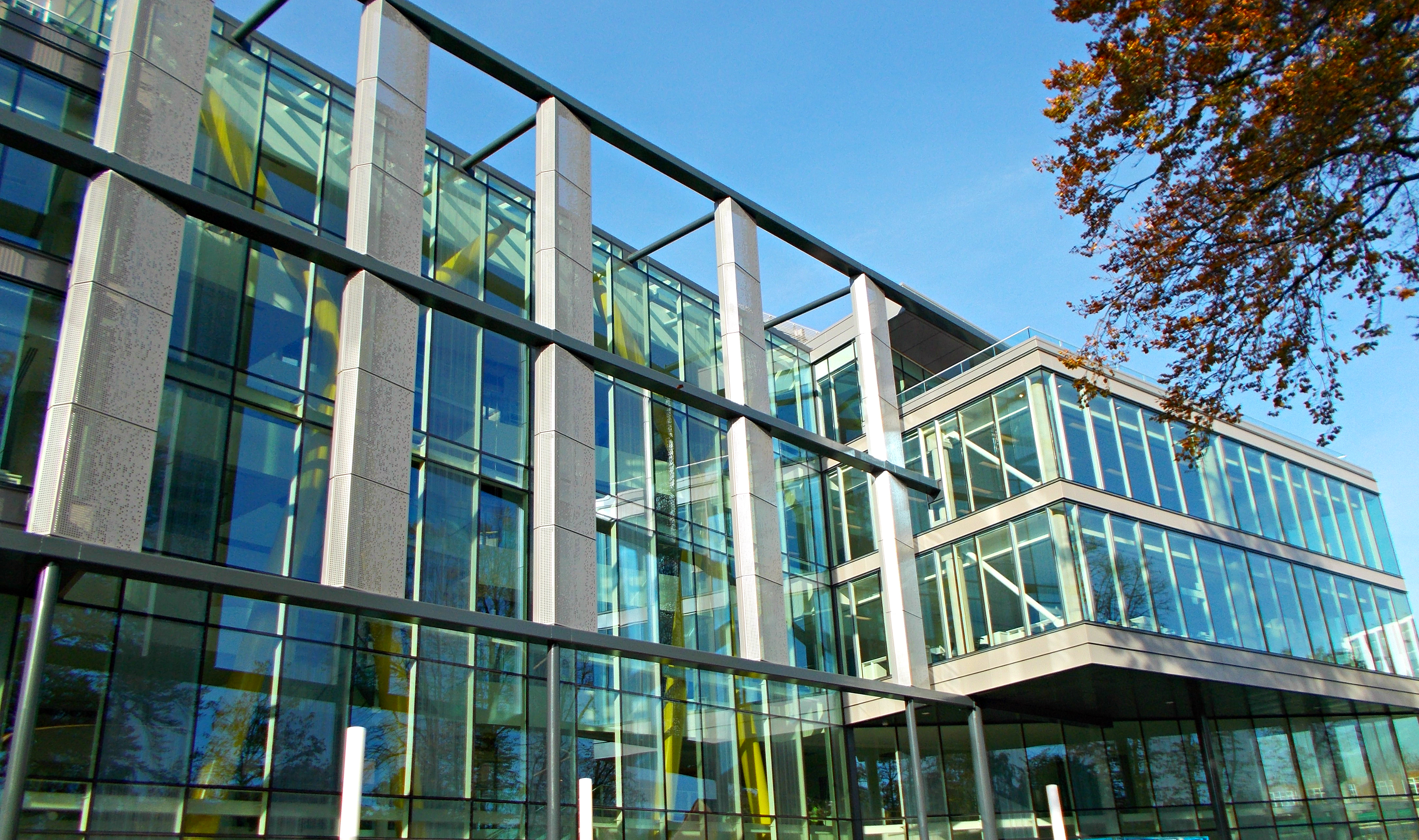
The principal executive office in Sutton, London

The current headquarters for Subsea 7 is located at 40 Brighton Road, Sutton, London.

Subsea 7 global offices
Africa	Americas	Asia/Oceania	Europe
Angola	Brazil	Australia	France
Egypt	Mexico	Indonesia	Luxembourg
Ghana	United States	Malaysia	Norway
Mozambique	Canada	Russia	Portugal
Nigeria		Saudi Arabia	United Kingdom
		Singapore	
		United Arab Emirates	
		Turkey	
		Azerbaijan	

== See also ==
- List of oilfield service companies
