= Stolt-Nielsen =

Provider of transportation and storage for liquids

Stolt-Nielsen Limited
- Type: Public
- Traded as: OSE: SNI
- Industry: Chemical Logistics; Aquaculture
- Predecessor: Parcel Tankers Inc.
- Founded: 1959
- Founder: Jacob Stolt-Nielsen
- Headquarters: London (UK)
- Area served: Worldwide
- Key people: Niels G. Stolt-Nielsen(Chairman); Dr. Udo Lange (CEO); Maren Schroeder (President, Stolt Tankers); Guy Bessant (President Stolthaven Terminals); Hans Augusteijn (President Stolt Tanker Containers); Jordi Trias (President Stolt Sea Farm)
- Products: Logistics; Bulk liquid cargo Chemical tankers Tank containers Shipping terminals LNG carrier Fish farming
- Revenue: US$2.769 billion (2025)
- Operating income: US$426.5 million (2025)
- Net income: US$350.2 million (2025)
- Total assets: US$5,775 million (2025)
- Number of employees: 7000+ (2025)
- Website: www.stolt-nielsen.com

Stolt-Nielsen Limited (SNL) is a global provider of bulk liquid logistics, operating across three core businesses: parcel tanker shipping, bulk liquid storage terminals, and tank containers. Through its Stolt Tankers division, it is one of the world largest operators of sophisticated stainless steel chemical tankers. The company also runs a land based aquaculture business. Founded in 1959, it is registered in Bermuda with operations managed from London and Rotterdam.

== History ==
=== Founding ===
Company founder Jacob Stolt-Nielsen began his career training at a ship brokerage in London, when he noticed an increase in certain kinds of liquids being shipped over the sea, especially those that served as the base materials for plastics. He moved to New York City in order to work for R.J. Chianelli, a broker in the chemicals industry that focused on these products. He witnessed the explosion in growth of the plastics industry, building on technology developed during World War II. However, the basic materials needed for the creation of plastics were new substances that the traditional shipping industry did not yet know how to ship safely or effectively.

There was a need in the industry for tankers that could transport different liquid chemicals in separation from each other, in order to keep the substances strictly pure upon delivery. There was also a need for the creation of packaging or housing the materials such that they would not eat through the containment. He developed a system using deep-well submersible pumps: one pump and one tank per parcel of liquid, in order to maintain the purity of the substances and the integrity of the containment. For his idea he received 20% of a new venture looking to monetize the idea, with Chianelli receiving 20% and 60% going to a customer of theirs, C.P. Steuber. The new firm was called Chemical Carriers Inc., formed one year after Stolt-Nielsen had first arrived in the US.

The new system improved the cost efficiency of shipping the chemicals by over 300%, resulting in an immediate profit for the company and the nickname "Jackpot Nielsen" for the new method's inventor. The maiden voyage of the new tanker system was made on board the Freddy. This was the prototype for the "parcel tanker", a further development on the idea by Stolt-Nielsen. Stolt-Nielsen leveraged his invention into his work as a ship broker, and in 1959 Stolt-Nielsen officially became a ship owner with his purchase of the Stolt Avance.

=== 1959-2000 ===
The company purchased the Fossvik in 1961, which was renamed the Stolt Avenir, followed by the Ringerd, renamed the Stolt Victor. In 1962 the company opened its first Asian office in Tokyo, in order for the Victor to service that area of the world. By 1963 the company had offices in Oslo, Norway; New York, United States and Tokyo, Japan and was operating 18 ships. In 1965 the company purchased the Stolt Condor and Stolt Atlantic, all time-chartered to Parcel Tankers, and run from the port at Haugesund, Norway. They also began to expand into South America. In 1971 the first storage terminal was acquired and in 1972 Sea Farms (then not part of the Stolt-Nielsen Group) was founded. In 1988 the company issued an initial public offering on NASDAQ. Jacob passed on his position as CEO to his son Niels G. Stolt-Nielsen in 2000, with Jacob staying as chairman of the company.

=== US federal investigation ===
Stolt-Nielsen entered an amnesty agreement in January 2003 with the United States Department of Justice (DOJ), on condition that it fully disclose the operating activities of its competitors and partners. The result of this disclosure led to criminal charges against two companies, Odfjell and JO Tankers. The DOJ rescinded its amnesty and withdrew from the agreement with Stolt-Nielsen in March 2004. Stolt-Nielsen responded by filing civil complaints against the government, arguing that the DOJ had illegally breached its contract with Stolt-Nielsen by withdrawing amnesty. The resulting trial in 2005 ruled unanimously in favor of Stolt-Nielsen and its executives. The court issued injunctions restricting the DOJ from indicting the company and found that the DOJ had not provided sufficient proof that Stolt-Nielsen was in breach of contract.

=== 2000s ===
In 2005 the company saw a 61% in operating income. In 2007 the company voluntarily delisted from NASDAQ, and the DOJ dismissed all antitrust accusations against the company. By the end of 2007 the company had recovered from the dismissed allegations, with a $216.4 million profit and a 12% increase in operating revenue to $1.75 billion. The US Supreme Court refused to hear the appeal of antitrust allegations. The decision enabled Stolt-Nielsen to petition the district court in Philadelphia to dismiss the indictment based on the amnesty agreement—a petition that was successful. The court threw out the three-year attempt to indict Stolt-Nielsen, as it had fully complied with the amnesty agreement they had previously signed.

In 2009 Jacob Stolt-Nielsen stepped down as Chairman, remaining a director of the board. He was succeeded by then Vice-Chairman Christer Olsson, a member of the board since 1993. In 2011 the company transported 17.4 million tons in 12,179 parcels for 410 customers, with ships able to transport more than 600 different chemicals. That year the company had also taken the lead in anti-piracy efforts, spending over $1 million per month to protect its ships, with the use of various technologies and armed guards.

=== 2010s ===
In the aftermath of Hurricane Isaac, it was discovered that Stolthaven LLC's terminal in Braithwaite, Louisiana (near New Orleans) terminal leaked thousands of gallons of hazardous material. In addition there were several railroad tankers that were full of hazardous material and left at the plant for the duration of the hurricane. Many of the rail cars were overturned and potentially leaked hazardous material. On 11 September 2012 Stolthaven reported to the Louisiana Department of Environmental Quality that it had potentially leaked 97.3 gallons of benzene, 177,568 gallons of diethylethanolamine, 97.3 gallons of naphthalene, and large amounts of various other hazardous chemicals. The LDEQ immediately launched an investigation to determine the amount of chemicals spilled and to assess the hurricane preparedness of the Braithwaite terminal. The LDEQ fined Stolthaven LLC twice, once for a false reporting of a chemical spill, and second for a lack of preparation for the hurricane.

In May 2014, the company made a partnership with the Dutch multinational commodity trading company, Trafigura to develop a new bitumen terminal in the UK. It was announced that the companies have plans to begin operations at the import center from mid-2015 at Stolthaven Terminals’ Dagenham site, east of London. The Dutch trading company are proposing to invest at least £15m over ten years.

In June 2015, Stolt-Nielsen and Golar LNG announced a joint venture to pursue production and distribution opportunities. The firm also made a strategic investment in the Golar, acquiring a 2.3 percent stake.

In November 2016, Stolt-Nielsen announced the completion of the acquisition of the chemical tanker operations of Jo Tankers consisting of 13 chemical tankers and a 50% share in a joint venture with eight chemical tanker newbuildings, representing an enterprise value of $575.0 million.

== Operations ==
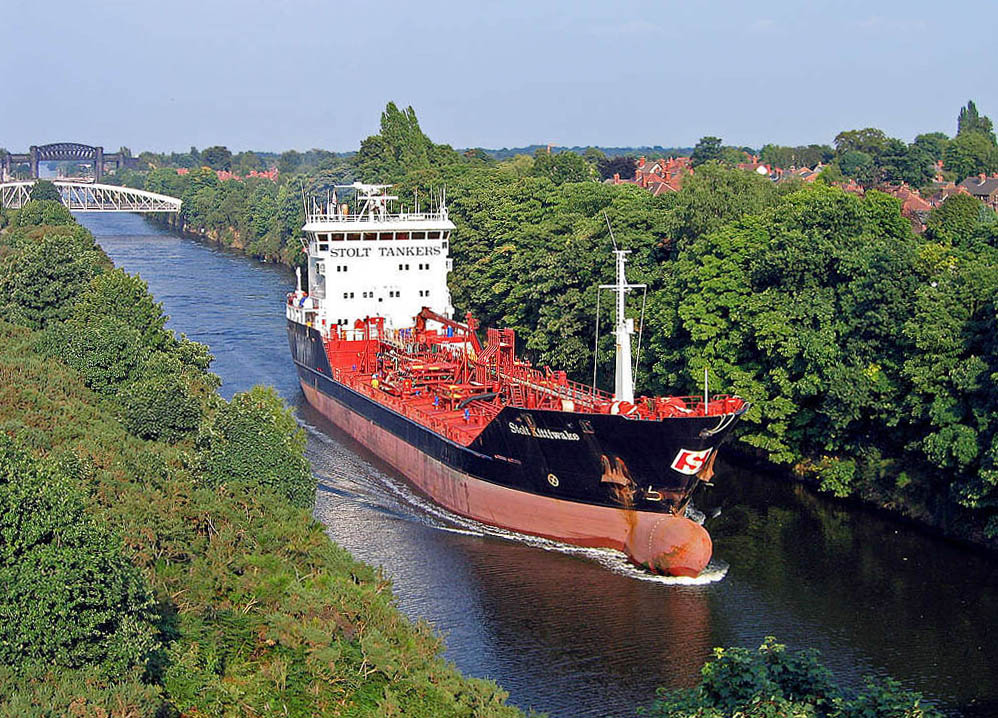
Stolt Kittiwake on the way outward from Carrington, UK in 2005

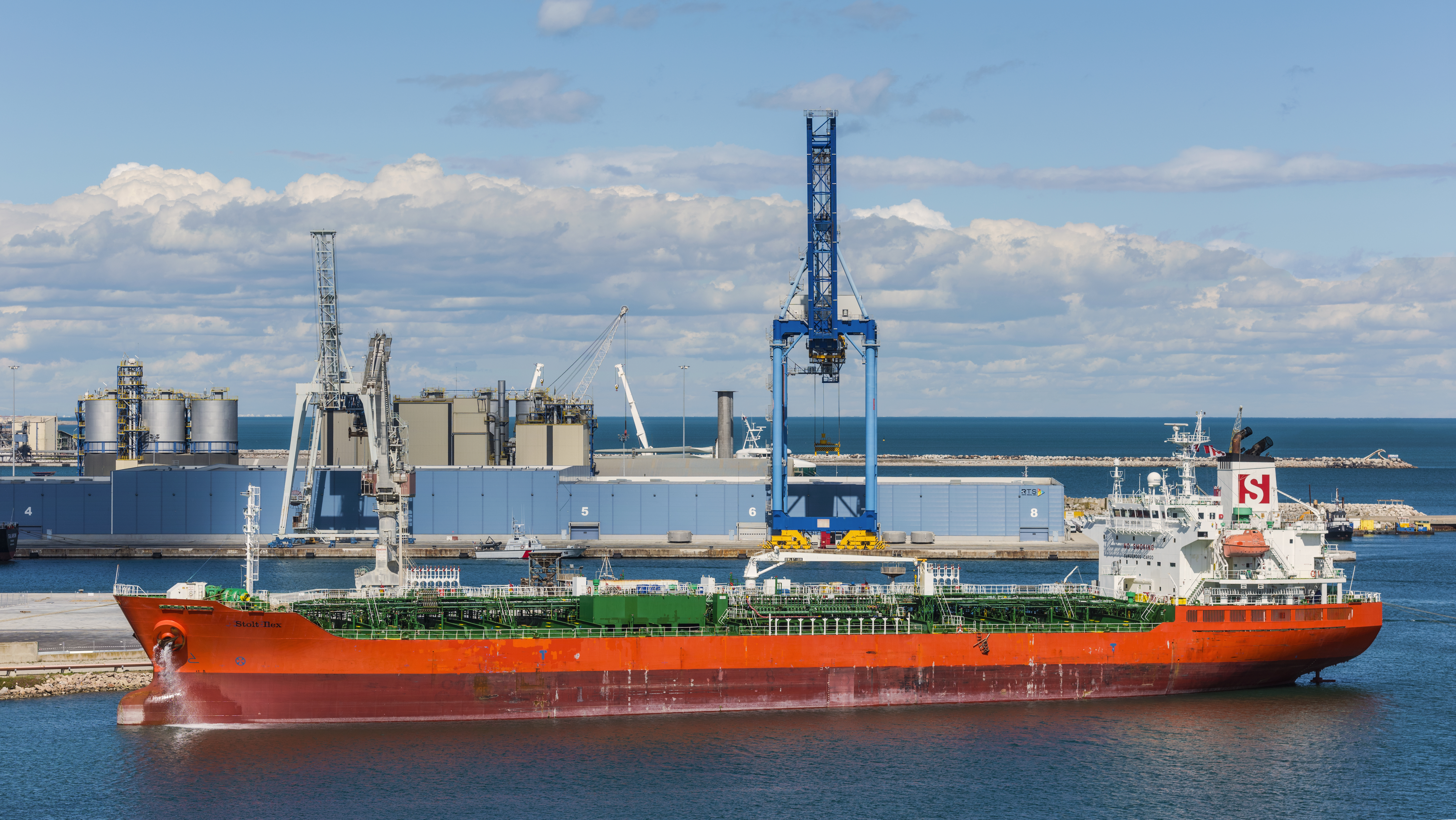
Stolt Ilex in the harbour of Sète

=== Headquarters ===
Stolt-Nielsen Limited is registered in Bermuda. Corporate services are provided from Rotterdam and London. The parcel tanker, terminal and tank container businesses are managed from Rotterdam, and the aquaculture business is headquartered in Santiago de Compostella, Spain.

=== Stolt tankers ===
The company first started with a single charter tanker, and today the Stolt Tankers division is the world's largest parcel tanker company with a fleet of more than 160 deep-sea, coastal and inland tankers.

=== Stolthaven terminals ===
Stolthaven Terminals operates a global network of 20 owned and joint-venture bulk-liquid terminals with a total of 4.1 million cubic meters of storage capacity. The company's six wholly owned terminals are located in New Orleans and Houston in the U.S., Santos in Brazil, Singapore, London in the UK and Moerdijk in the Netherlands. Stolthaven has nine majority-owned terminals in Australia and New Zealand, and also participates in five joint-venture operations: Antwerp in Belgium, Westport in Malaysia, Ulsan in South Korea, and Ningbo and Tianjin in China. The company also operates and maintains more than 450 railroad tank cars in North America.

=== Stolt tank containers ===
Jacob Stolt-Nielsen helped establish United Tank Containers in 1978, starting small with only a few units. The outfit was eventually renamed Stolt Tank Containers (STC). It currently operates the world's largest fleet of stainless steel ISO tank containers, with more than 47,000 units in service. The fleet is supported by a global network of 21 offices, depots and repair and cleaning facilities in locations worldwide.

=== Stolt-Nielsen gas ===
Stolt-Nielsen Limited entered the market for the transportation of liquefied petroleum gas (LPG) in late 2009. The company purchased the Althea Gas, built in 2003, and the VLGC Yuhsho, built in 1999. The company began further integrating the gas business into its business model by the purchase of second-hand liquefied petroleum gas carriers, operating in both the spot and short-term period markets. On 19 November 2010 SNG entered into a partnership with Sungas Holdings Ltd to become equal shareholders in Avance Gas Holding Ltd, which was previously wholly owned by SNG. Avance Gas now owns six VLGCs.

=== Stolt Sea Farm ===
The company got into commercial-scale aquaculture in 1972. The company first started farming salmon and rainbow trout, deciding that it would be easier than other stocks, such as lobster and sea trout. They began their efforts under the name Sea Farm, so there was no name association to Stolt-Nielsen in its early years. The separate company went public in 1985, which it remained until it was purchased by Stolt-Nielsen in 2006. In 2005 the salmon, trout, halibut, tilapia, cod, sturgeon and caviar operations of Stolt Sea Farm were merged into Marine Harvest. In 2006 the sturgeon and caviar operation was merged back into the Stolt Sea Farm group. After selling its Sterling Caviar business in 2021, today Stolt Sea Farm is a land-based fish farm producer of turbot and sole.
