= Kristian Siem =

Norwegian businessman (born 1949)

Kristian Siem (born February 7, 1949) is a Norwegian businessman. He is chairman of Subsea 7 and Siem Industries, a formerly-listed company with ownership interests in the oil and gas industry and shipping.

== Life and career ==
He worked for Fred Olsen's shipping company until 1978, when he bought a cheap oil rig, which today has the name Borgsten Dolphin.

Siem was the chairman and main shareholder of the Norwegian Cruise Line. In 2009, his fleet adopted the Norwegian flag.

In 2011, the King of Norway awarded Siem the Royal Norwegian Order of St. Olav for his service to business.

He is the son of industrialist Martin Siem (1915-1996) and Inger Aagard (1916-2012). His siblings include brother, Ole Martin Siem (born 1956), a financier.
