= Offshore (hydrocarbons) =

Oil industry operations at sea

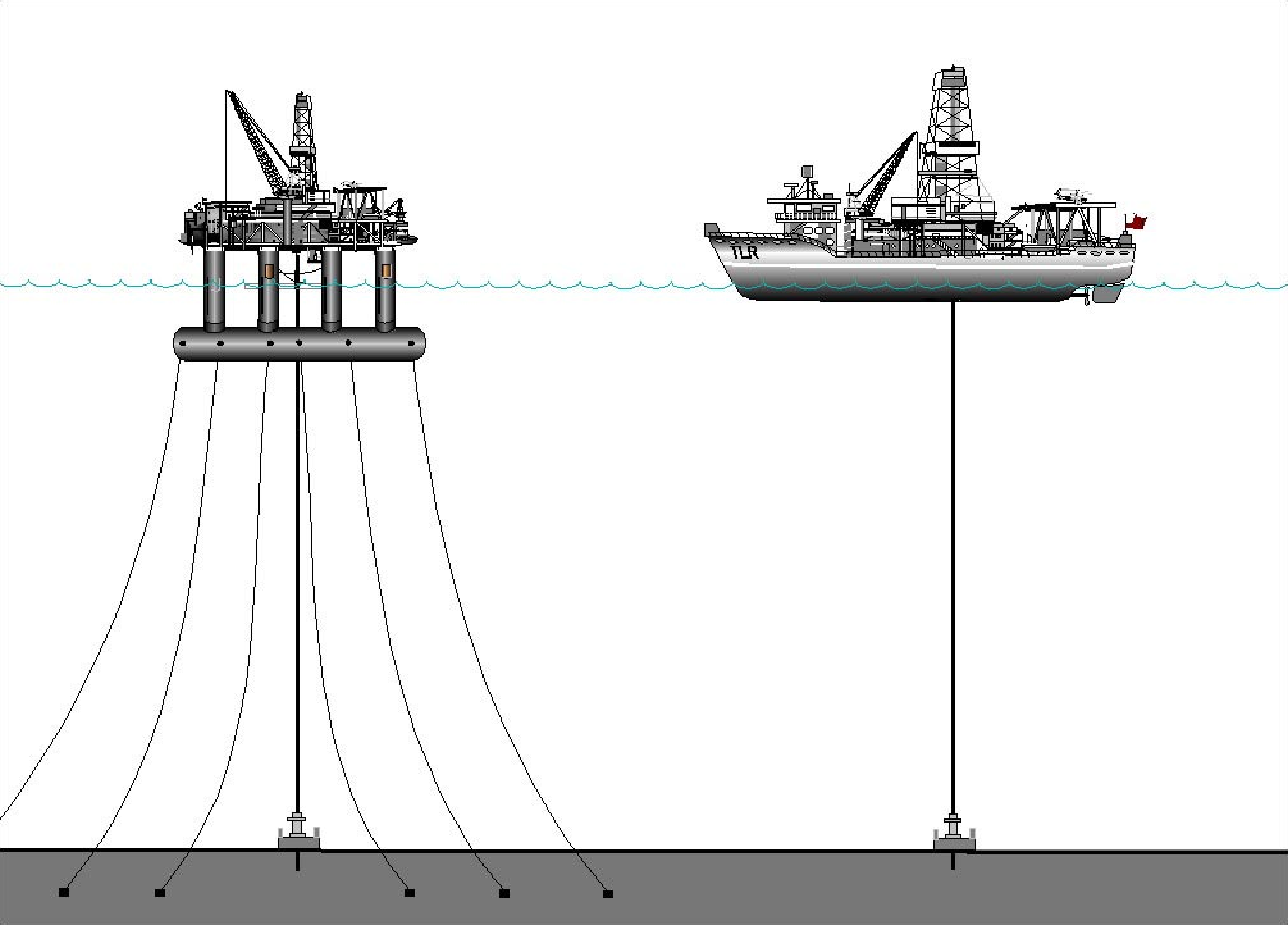
Deepwater drilling vessels - semisubmersible and drilling ship

"Offshore", when used in relation to hydrocarbons, refers to operations undertaken at, or under the, sea in association with an oil, natural gas or condensate field that is under the seabed, or to activities carried out in relation to such a field. Offshore is part of the upstream sector of the oil and gas industry.

Offshore activities include searching for potential underground crude oil and natural gas reservoirs and accumulations, the drilling of exploratory wells, and subsequently drilling and operating the wells that recover and bring the crude oil and/or natural gas to the surface.

Offshore exploration is performed with floating drilling units, drill ships, semi-submersible installations and jack-up installations.

At the surface (either on the seabed or above water) offshore facilities are designed, constructed, commissioned and operated to process and treat the hydrocarbon oil and gas. Permanent oil and gas installations and plant include subsea wellheads and flowlines, offshore platforms and tethered floating installations. Other facilities include storage vessels, tanker ships, and pipelines to transport hydrocarbons onshore for further treatment and distribution. Further treatment and distribution comprise the midstream and downstream sectors of the industry.

There are various types of installation used in the development of offshore oil and gas fields and subsea facilities, these include: fixed platforms, compliant towers, semi-submersible platforms, jack-up installations, floating production systems, tension-leg platforms, gravity-based structure and spar platforms.

Production facilities on these installations include oil, gas and water separation systems; oil heating, cooling, pumping, metering and storage; gas cooling, treating and compression; and produced water clean-up. Other facilities may include reservoir gas injection and water injection; fuel gas systems; power generation; vents and flares; drains and sewage treatment; compressed air; helicopter fuel; heating, ventilation and air conditioning; and accommodation facilities for the crew.

The final phase of offshore operations is the abandonment of wells, the decommissioning and removal of offshore facilities to onshore disposal, and the flushing, cleaning and abandonment of pipelines.

== See also ==
- Deepwater drilling
- Offshore drilling
- Offshore oil and gas in the United States
- Oil platform
- Oil production plant
- Semi-submersible platform
- Submarine pipeline
- Subsea (technology)
