= The Night House =

The Night House may refer to:

- The Night House (2020 film), a supernatural psychological horror film
- The Night House (novel), a horror novel by Jo Nesbø
- The Night House (upcoming film), an American psychological horror film, based on the novel
