= Cary Joji Fukunaga =

American filmmaker (born 1977)

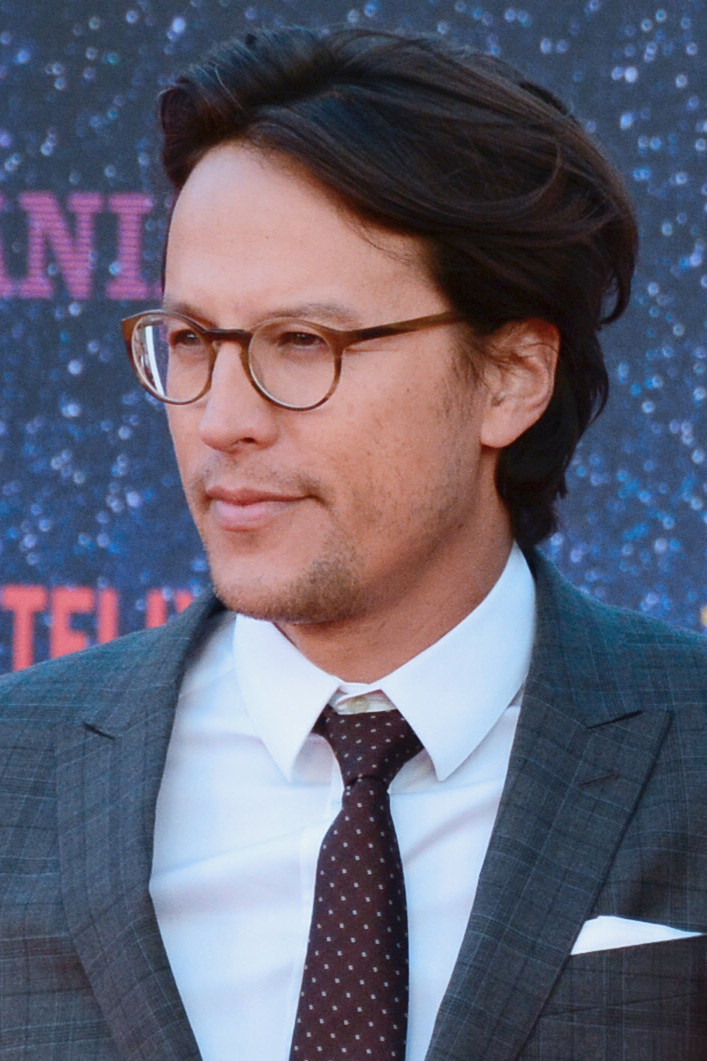
- Fukunaga in 2018
- Born: July 10, 1977 (age 49); Oakland, California, U.S.
- Education: UC Santa Cruz; New York University
- Occupations: Director; producer; screenwriter; cinematographer
- Years active: 2002–present

Cary Joji Fukunaga (born July 10, 1977) is an American filmmaker. He first attracted attention and acclaim for directing the first season of the HBO series True Detective in 2014, for which he won the Primetime Emmy Award for Outstanding Directing for a Drama Series. His feature films include the thriller Sin nombre (2009), the period drama Jane Eyre (2011), the war drama Beasts of No Nation (2015), and the 25th James Bond film, No Time to Die (2021). Fukunaga also co-wrote the Stephen King horror film adaptation It (2017). He directed and executive produced the Netflix limited series Maniac (2018) and executive produced and directed several episodes of the Apple TV+ miniseries Masters of the Air (2024).

== Early life ==
Fukunaga was born on July 10, 1977 in Oakland, California. His father, Anthony Shuzo Fukunaga, was a third-generation Japanese American, born in an internment camp during World War II. His mother, Gretchen May Grufman, is Swedish-American and worked as a dental hygienist, and later as a college history instructor and university assistant professor of history. Fukunaga inherited his interest in history from her. His parents eventually divorced. His family often relocated within the San Francisco Bay Area, moving to Berkeley, Albany, Vallejo, Benicia, Sebastopol and back to Oakland.

Fukunaga attended Analy High School. He graduated from the University of California, Santa Cruz with a Bachelor of Arts in history in 1999 and attended the Grenoble Institute of Political Studies, where he studied geopolitics and international law.

Fukunaga had originally wanted to be a professional snowboarder, but switched to filmmaking in his mid-twenties. He got his start as a camera intern and later applied to film school. He enrolled in the New York University Tisch School of the Arts Graduate Film Program.

== Career ==
=== Short films ===
Fukunaga wrote and directed the short film Victoria para Chino (2004) while at NYU, which screened at the Sundance Film Festival and received a Student Academy Award in 2005. It won an Audience Award for Best Narrative Student Short Film at the 2004 Austin Film Festival, a Best Student Film award at the 2006 Ashland Independent Film Festival, a BAFTA/LA Award for Excellence – Honorable Mention award at the 2005 Aspen Shortsfest, Best Student Film at the 2005 BendFilm Festival, Best Short Film and an Audience Award for Best Short Film at the 2005 Gen Art Film Festival, Best Short Film at the 2005 Milan International Film Festival, and the Jury Prize for Best Student Short at the 2004 Woodstock Film Festival.

Fukunaga wrote and directed the short films Kofi (2003) and Sleepwalking in the Rift (2012). He wrote and directed a segment in the omnibus film Chinatown Film Project (2009).

=== Feature films ===
Sin Nombre

Fukunaga made his feature film debut with Sin Nombre, which he wrote and directed. It received positive reviews and a number of awards, including the Directing award at the 2009 Sundance Film Festival and a New Director's Award for Fukunaga at the 2009 Edinburgh International Film Festival. In 2009, it won Best Foreign Language Film awards from the Austin Film Critics Association, the Dallas-Fort Worth Film Critics Association Awards, the Florida Film Critics Circle Awards, the San Diego Film Critics Society Awards (2nd place for Best Foreign Language Film), and the Washington DC Area Film Critics Association Awards. Cinematographer Adriano Goldman won the Cinematography award at the 2009 Sundance Film Festival; and at the 2009 Stockholm Film Festival, the film won a Best Actor award for Edgar Flores, and Best Directorial Debut and FIPRESCI Prizes for Fukunaga. It also brought Fukunaga the 2010 Premios ACE award for Cinema – Best First Work.

The film was nominated for Best Feature, Best Director and Best Cinematography at the 2010 Independent Spirit Awards, and was nominated by the 2009 British Independent Film Awards (Best Foreign Film), the 2010 Broadcast Film Critics Association Awards (Best Foreign Language Film), the 2009 Chicago Film Critics Association Awards (Most Promising Filmmaker; Best Foreign Language Film), the 2010 Image Awards (Outstanding Foreign Motion Picture), the Bronze Horse at the 2009 Stockholm Film Festival and the 2009 Sundance Film Festival Grand Jury Prize.

Speaking with journalist Brandon Kosters, Fukunaga said that he wanted viewing audiences to "feel like they're on the journey with the characters," regardless of the audience members' individual political identities. "You can maintain your opinion after, Fukunaga said, "but I want you to go through [the character's journey] with them."

Jane Eyre

In 2010, Fukunaga directed a new film adaptation of Jane Eyre starring Mia Wasikowska, Michael Fassbender, Jamie Bell and Judi Dench. It was released in 2011 and nominated for an Academy Award for Best Achievement in Costume Design for Michael O'Connor, and a 2012 Goya Award for Best European Film.

It was nominated for a 2012 BAFTA Award (Best Costume Design), a 2012 Broadcast Film Critics Association Award (Best Costume Design), the 2012 Costume Designers Guild Awards (Excellence in Period Film), the 2012 Evening Standard British Film Awards (Best Technical Achievement), the 2011 Phoenix Film Critics Society Awards (Best Costume Design), the 2011 Satellite Awards (Best Costume Design).

The 2012 Australian Film Institute awards as well as the 2011 British Independent Film Awards nominated Mia Wasikowska for a Best Actress award. Screenwriter Moira Buffini (as well as author Charlotte Brontë) were nominated for a 2012 USC Scripter Award.

Beasts of No Nation

Fukunaga directed, wrote and filmed Beasts of No Nation, based on the novel of the same name by Uzodinma Iweala, in which Idris Elba stars as Commandant, a lead character. The movie was picked up by Netflix for a reported $12 million as part of an effort to expand into original films. On November 25, 2015, Fukunaga was nominated for the Independent Spirit Award for Best Director and Best Cinematography for his work on Beasts of No Nation, and the film received a nomination for Best Feature.

No Time to Die

On September 20, 2018, it was announced that Fukunaga would direct the 25th James Bond film, replacing Danny Boyle. He is the first American filmmaker to direct an official Bond film for EON Productions. Fukunaga was originally considered to direct Spectre before Sam Mendes returned. (Note: The American directors John Huston and Robert Parrish were two of six directors who worked on the 1967 adaptation of Casino Royale, and Irvin Kershner directed the 1983 film Never Say Never Again. However, neither film was produced by Eon Productions or part of the EON series canon.) The film, eventually titled No Time to Die, was co-written by Fukunaga alongside Neal Purvis and Robert Wade and Phoebe Waller-Bridge, and was eventually released in October 2021 in the United States.

Blood on Snow

In September 2024, it was reported that Fukunaga would direct and produce the Jo Nesbø crime thriller adaptation Blood on Snow. Tom Hardy and Aaron Taylor-Johnson were attached to star, with filming due to take place later that year. It was later announced in February 2025 that Benedict Cumberbatch was replacing Hardy, while Eva Green, Emma Laird, and Ben Mendelsohn were added to the cast.

=== Television ===
Fukunaga directed all eight episodes of the first season of the 2014 HBO TV series True Detective, which was written and created by novelist and screenwriter Nic Pizzolatto. The series stars Matthew McConaughey, Woody Harrelson and Michelle Monaghan. Fukunaga served as an Executive Producer on the show. The series received critical praise and was nominated for five Primetime Emmy Awards, including Outstanding Drama Series and Outstanding Directing for Fukunaga, who won. For the second season of True Detective, Fukunaga did not return as director, but continued to serve as executive producer.

Fukunaga was originally slated to direct the 2018 TNT TV series The Alienist. However, due to scheduling conflicts he was replaced by Jakob Verbruggen, although he retained a "created by" credit and remained as an executive producer. Fukunaga served as executive producer for the follow-up series to The Alienist, The Angel of Darkness, based on the novel of the same name.

Fukunaga directed all ten episodes of the dark comedy series Maniac for Netflix. It premiered on September 21, 2018.

=== Writing and producing ===
Fukunaga has written most of the films he has directed. The short films that he has written the screenplays for include Kofi (2003) and Victoria para chino (2004). He wrote the screenplay to his feature film, Sin Nombre (2009), as well as his segment for the omnibus film Chinatown Film Project (2009).

Through his production company, Parliament of Owls, Fukunaga has produced or served as executive producer on most of the projects he has directed. He was the executive producer for his short films Kofi (2003) and Victoria para chino (2004). He was an executive producer on Andrew Okpeaha MacLean's feature film thriller, On the Ice, which won "Best Debut Film" and the Crystal Bear (Best Feature Film for the Generation 14+) at the 2011 Berlin Film Festival, among other awards.

Fukunaga served as an executive producer for the HBO series he directed, True Detective. Warner Bros. chose Fukunaga to develop its adaptations of Stephen King's It (2017 and 2019), the first of which was initially due to start shooting in summer 2015. Fukunaga was set to direct the first film and was expected to co-write the second. Three weeks before production was slated to begin, Fukunaga left the project.

=== Cinematography and other work ===
Fukunaga served as a cinematographer on a number of short film projects, including Handmade (2013; documentary short directed by Rob Meyer), Sikumi (2008; also known as Sikumi (On the Ice) about an Inuk hunter on the frozen Arctic Ocean, directed by Andrew Okpeaha MacLean), Team Queen (2007) (a short film directed by Leah Meyerhoff), the feature documentary Death of Two Sons (2006; directed by Micah Schaffer), the short films Clear Water (2005; directed by Natalie Mooallem), White (2005; directed by Sebastian Mantilla), Kinnaq Nigaqtuqtuaq (2005; directed by Andrew Okpeaha MacLean), Two Men (2005) (directed by Ian Olds) and Mating Call (2004; directed by Patricio Serna).

He served as a camera operator on the short Glory at Sea (2008) (directed by Beasts of the Southern Wild director Benh Zeitlin), as a gaffer on the short film Just Make Believe (2008) (directed by Jadrien Steele), as an additional cinematographer on the TV documentary Small Steps: Creating the High School for Contemporary Arts (2007), assistant camera on the short film Dock (2004; directed by Nina Martinek), additional photography for the documentary Lockdown, USA (about the "War on Drugs" campaign and directed by Rebecca Chaiklin and Michael Skolnik), additional camera for Autumn's Eyes (2006; directed by Paola Mendoza and Gabriel Noble), a grip on the feature film Mango Kiss (2004; directed by Sascha Rice), and as an additional film loader on the feature film Black Cadillac (2003; directed by John Murlowski and starring Randy Quaid).

Following the 2022 Russian invasion of Ukraine Fukunaga is documenting humanitarian relief efforts in Ukraine.

== Personal life ==
Fukunaga lives in New York City. He has lived in France, Japan, Mexico City and London, and is fluent in English, French and Spanish. He considers screenwriter Naomi Foner as a mentor.

== Misconduct allegations ==
In October 2021, Raeden Greer accused Fukunaga of pressuring her into doing a topless scene for True Detective that was not included in her contract for her role as a stripper.

In April and May 2022, three women accused Fukunaga of various forms of sexual harassment, including pursuing relationships with them while in a position of power over them in the workplace.

Actress and skateboarder Rachelle Vinberg posted videos to Instagram accusing Fukunaga of grooming her and many other young actresses, citing in particular her experience filming his "A Perfect Day" Samsung commercial in 2016 (when she was 18 years old), and said that she had been in therapy for a year and diagnosed with PTSD as a result of his behavior in their relationship. On May 5, 2022, twins Hannah and Cailin Loesch, who worked on Maniac, accused Fukunaga of sexual harassment and grooming.

== Filmography ==
Short film

Year	Title	Director	Writer	Producer
2003	Kofi	Yes	Yes	Executive
2004	Victoria para chino	Yes	Yes	Yes
2012	Sleepwalking in the Rift	Yes	Yes	Executive

=== Feature film ===
Year	Title	Director	Writer	Producer	DoP
2009	Chinatown Film Project	Yes	Yes	No	Yes
2009	Sin nombre	Yes	Yes	No	No
2011	Jane Eyre	Yes	No	No	No
2015	Beasts of No Nation	Yes	Yes	Yes	Yes
2017	It	No	Yes	No	No
2020	Joe Bell	No	No	Yes	No
2021	No Time to Die	Yes	Yes	No	No
2025	Ricky	No	No	Yes	No
2027	Blood on Snow	Yes	No	Yes	No

Executive producer

- On the Ice (2011)
- Little Boxes (2016)
- Thumper (2017)

Cinematographer only

Year	Title	Notes
2004	Mating Call	Short film
2004	The Adventures of Supernigger: Episode I – The Final Chapter	Short film
2005	Two Men	Short film
2005	Kinnaq Nigaqtuqtuaq	Short film
2005	White	Short film
2005	Clear Water	Short film
2006	Death of Two Sons	Documentary film
2007	Team Queen	Short film
2008	Sikumi (On the Ice)	Short film
2013	Handmade	Short film

=== Television ===
Year	Title	Director	Executive producer	Writer	Notes
2014	True Detective	Yes	Yes	No	Season 1
2018	The Alienist	No	Yes	Yes	Episodes "These Bloody Thoughts" and "Castle in the Sky"
2018	Maniac	Yes	Yes	No	Miniseries
2024	Masters of the Air	Yes	No	No	4 episodes
2024	Omnivore	No	Yes	Yes	Episodes "Chile" and "Rice"

== Awards and nominations ==
Year	Award	Work	Result
2005	Sundance Film Festival Honorable Mention in Short Filmmaking	Victoria para Chino	Won
2005	Aspen Shortsfest Jury Award for Best Student Film	Victoria para Chino	Won
2005	Austin Festival Audience Award for Best Narrative Short	Victoria para Chino	Won
2005	Britannia LA Award for Excellence	Victoria para Chino	Won
2005	Student Academy Award for Best Narrative Short	Victoria para Chino	Won
2005	Ashland Independent Film Award for Best Student Film	Victoria para Chino	Nominated
2009	Sundance Film Festival Dramatic Directing Award	Sin Nombre	Won
2009	Sundance Film Festival Grand Jury Prize: Dramatic	Sin Nombre	Nominated
2009	Edinburgh International Film Festival New Director's Award	Sin Nombre	Won
2009	Deauville Jury Special Prize	Sin Nombre	Won
2009	FIPRESCI Prize	Sin Nombre	Won
2009	Deauville Grand Special Prize	Sin Nombre	Nominated
2009	Stockholm Bronze Horse	Sin Nombre	Nominated
2009	Golden Venice Lion	Sin Nombre	Nominated
2010	Independent Spirit Award for Best Director	Sin Nombre	Nominated
2012	Goya Award for Best European Film	Jane Eyre	Nominated
2014	Primetime Emmy Award for Outstanding Directing for a Drama Series	True Detective	Won
2014	Primetime Emmy Award for Outstanding Drama Series	True Detective	Nominated
2015	Producers Guild of America Award for Best Episodic Drama	True Detective	Nominated
2015	Directors Guild of America Award for Outstanding Directing – Drama Series	True Detective	Nominated
2015	British Academy Television Award for Best International Programme	True Detective	Won
2015	Golden Lion	Beasts of No Nation	Nominated
2015	Capri Hollywood International Film Festival Award for Best Director	Beasts of No Nation	Won
2016	Independent Spirit Award for Best Feature	Beasts of No Nation	Nominated
2016	Independent Spirit Award for Best Director	Beasts of No Nation	Nominated
2016	Independent Spirit Award for Best Cinematography	Beasts of No Nation	Nominated
2016	American Society of Cinematographers Spotlight Award	Beasts of No Nation	Nominated
2016	Peabody Award	Beasts of No Nation	Won
2017	Bram Stoker Award for Best Screenplay	It	Nominated
2018	Primetime Emmy Award for Outstanding Limited Series	The Alienist	Nominated
2018	IndieWire Honors Auteur Award		Won
2019	Writers Guild of America Award for Television: Long Form – Adapted	Maniac	Nominated
2019	Producers Guild of America Award for Outstanding Producer of Limited Series Television	Maniac	Nominated
2019	Directors Guild of America Award for Outstanding Directing – Miniseries or TV Film	Maniac	Nominated
