= Independent Spirit Award for Best Supporting Performance =

Annual award dedicated to independent films

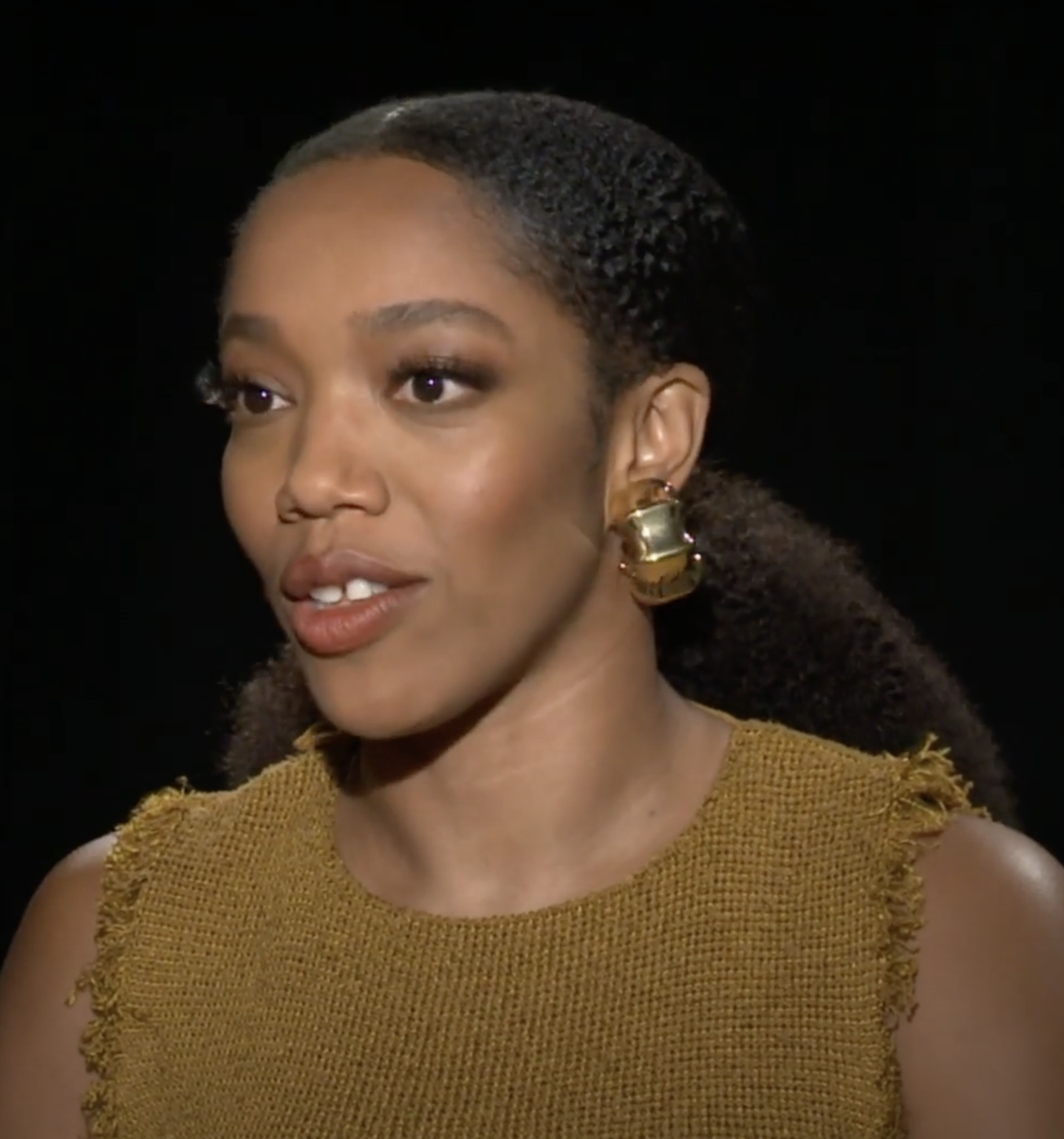
- The 2025 recipient : Naomi Ackie
- Country: United States
- Presented by: Film Independent
- First award: 2023
- Currently held by: Naomi Ackie for Sorry, Baby (2025)
- Website: filmindependent.org

The Independent Spirit Award for Best Supporting Performance is one of the annual awards given out by Film Independent, a non-profit organization dedicated to independent film and independent filmmakers. In 2022, the Independent Spirit Awards announced that the four acting categories would be retired and replaced with two gender neutral categories, with both Best Supporting Male and Best Supporting Female merging into the Best Supporting Performance category.

== Nominees and winners ==
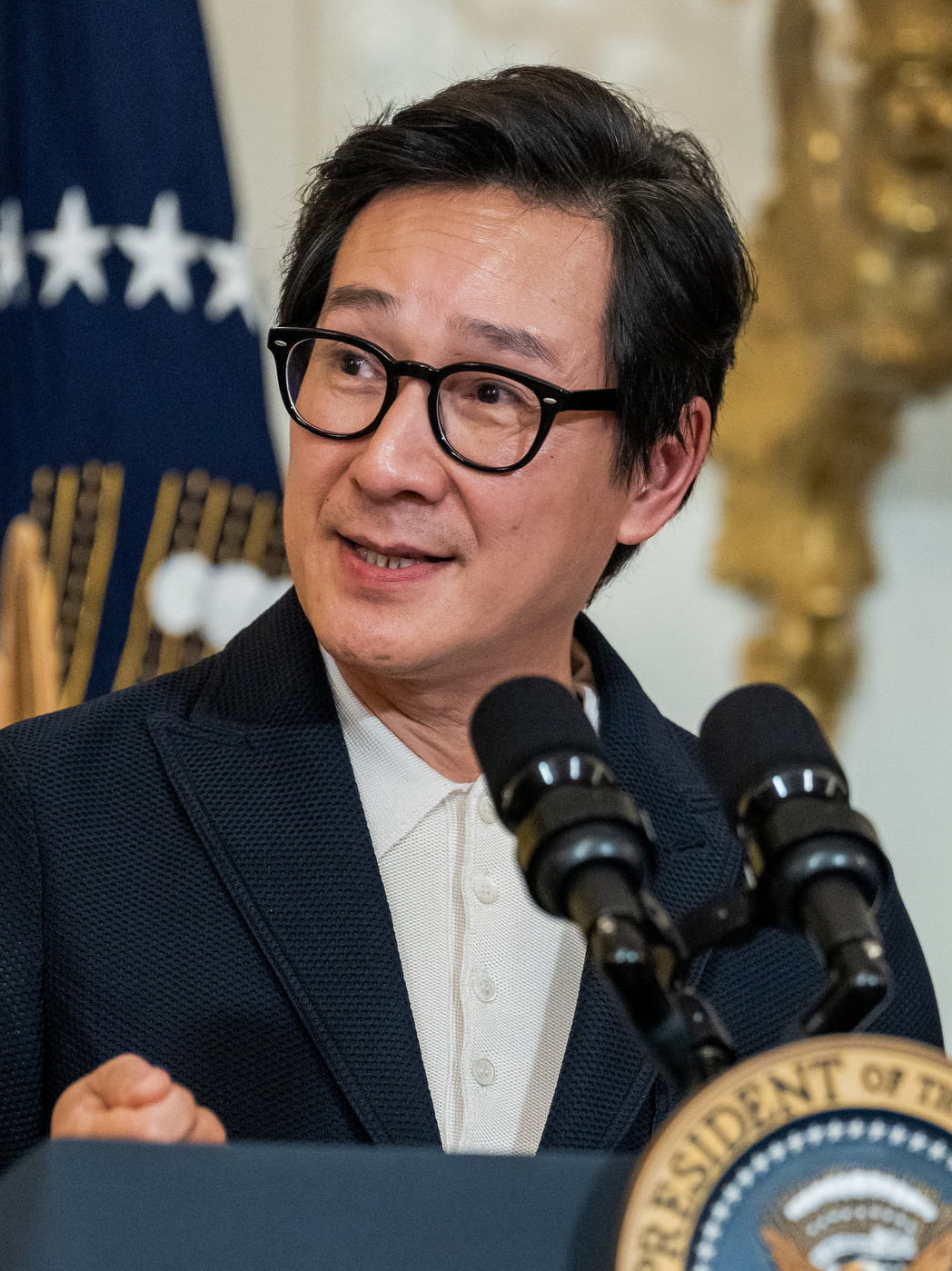
Ke Huy Quan was the first time winner in this category for Everything Everywhere All at Once (2022)

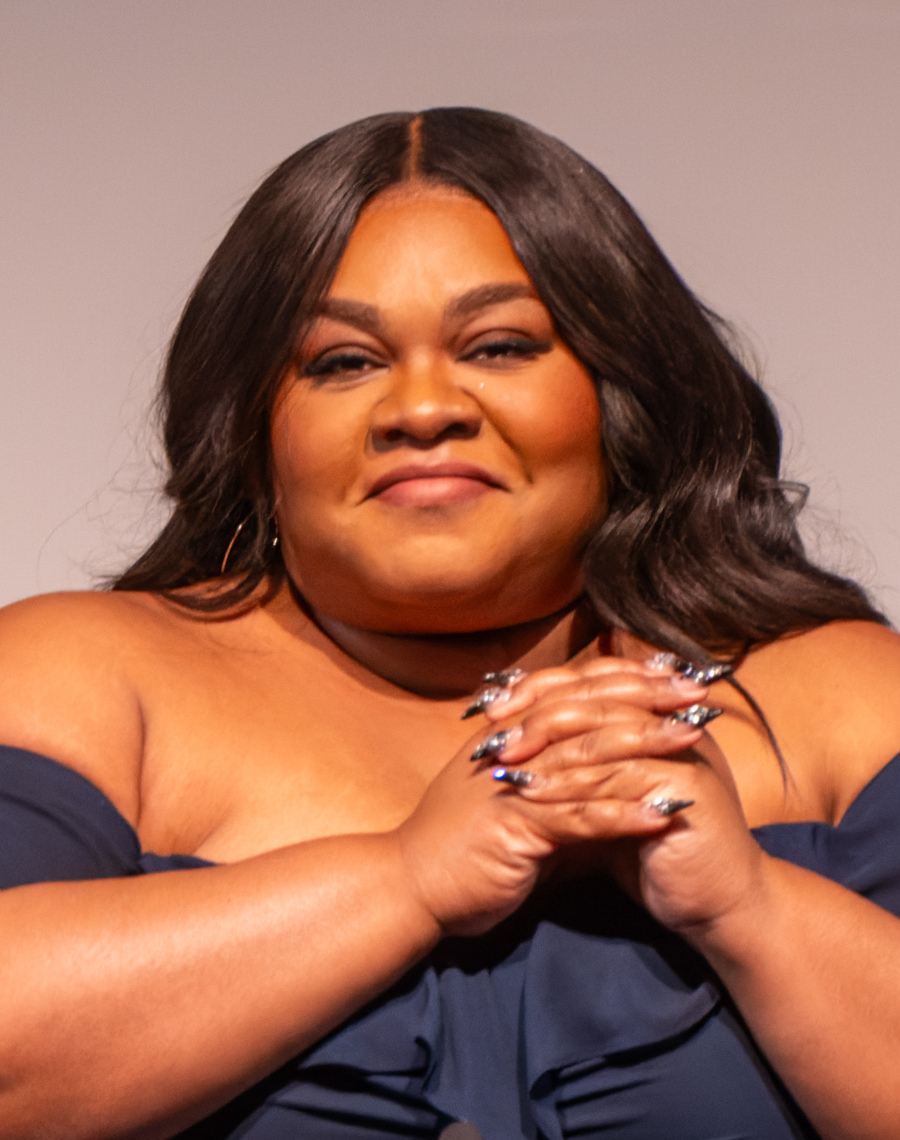
Da'Vine Joy Randolph won for The Holdovers (2023)

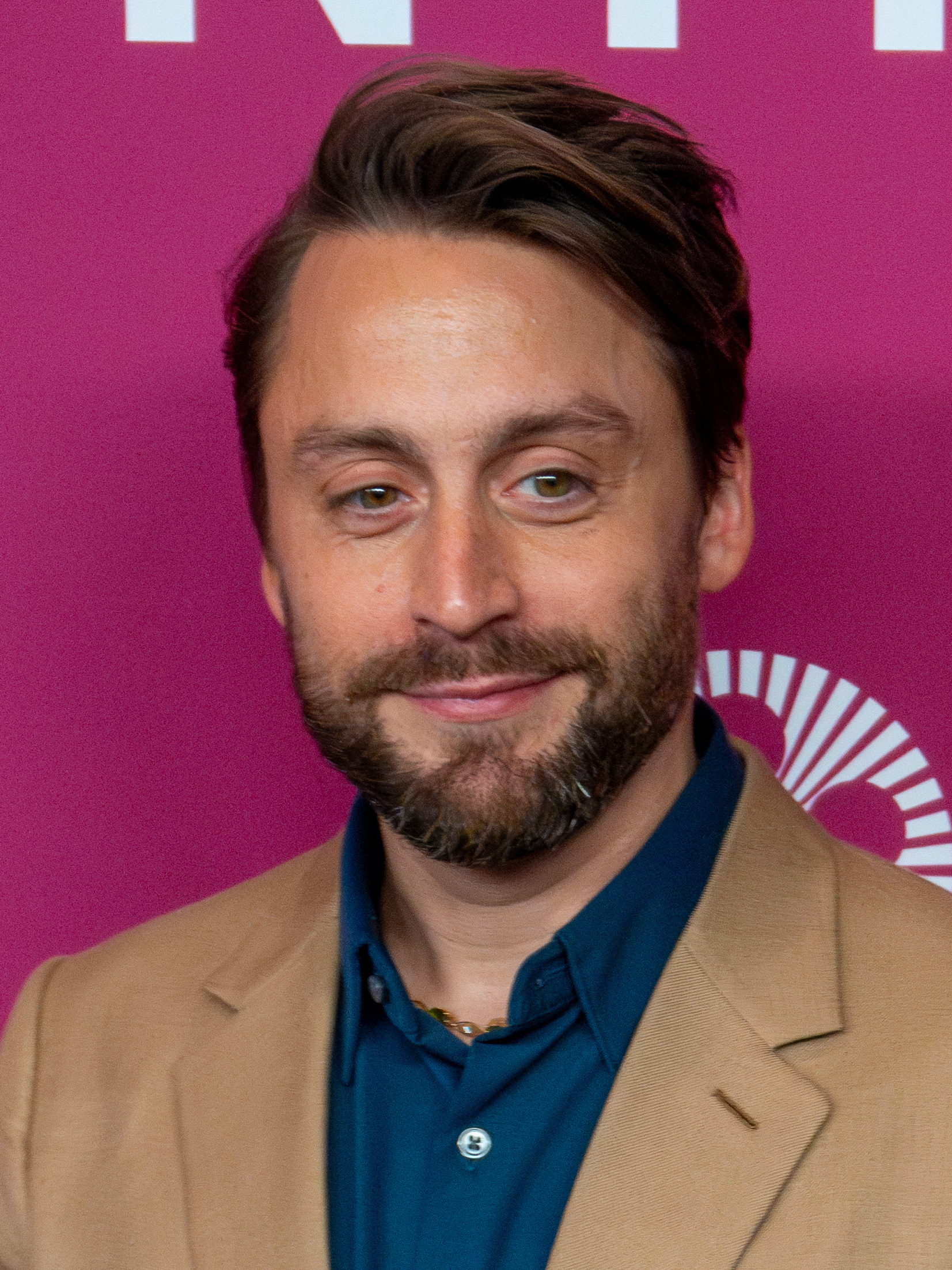
Kieran Culkin won for A Real Pain (2024)

=== 2020s ===
Year	Actor	Film	Role
2022	Ke Huy Quan	Everything Everywhere All at Once	Waymond Wang
2022	Jamie Lee Curtis	Everything Everywhere All at Once	Deirdre Beaubeirdre
2022	Brian Tyree Henry	Causeway	James
2022	Nina Hoss	Tár	Sharon Goodnow
2022	Brian d'Arcy James	The Cathedral	Richard Damrosch
2022	Trevante Rhodes	Bruiser	Porter
2022	Theo Rossi	Emily the Criminal	Youcef
2022	Mark Rylance	Bones and All	Sully
2022	Jonathan Tucker	Palm Trees and Power Lines	Tom
2022	Gabrielle Union	The Inspection	Inez French
2023	Da'Vine Joy Randolph	The Holdovers	Mary Lamb
2023	Erika Alexander	American Fiction	Coraline
2023	Sterling K. Brown	American Fiction	Clifford "Cliff" Ellison
2023	Noah Galvin	Theater Camp	Glenn Winthrop
2023	Anne Hathaway	Eileen	Rebecca Saint John
2023	Glenn Howerton	BlackBerry	Jim Balsillie
2023	Marin Ireland	Eileen	Rita Polk
2023	Charles Melton	May December	Joe Yoo
2023	Catalina Saavedra	Rotting in the Sun	Señora "Vero" Verónica
2023	Ben Whishaw	Passages	Martin
2024	Kieran Culkin	A Real Pain	Benji Kaplan
2024	Yura Borisov	Anora	Igor
2024	Joan Chen	Dìdi	Chungsing Wang
2024	Danielle Deadwyler	The Piano Lesson	Berniece
2024	Carol Kane	Between the Temples	Carla Kessler
2024	Karren Karagulian	Anora	Toros
2024	Kani Kusruti	Girls Will Be Girls	Anila
2024	Jack Haven	I Saw the TV Glow	Maddy Wilson
2024	Clarence Maclin	Sing Sing	Clarence “Divine Eye” Maclin
2024	Adam Pearson	A Different Man	Oswald
2025	Naomi Ackie	Sorry, Baby	Lydie
2025	Zoey Deutch	Nouvelle Vague	Jean Seberg
2025	Kirsten Dunst	Roofman	Leigh Wainscott
2025	Rebecca Hall	Peter Hujar's Day	Linda Rosenkrantz
2025	Nina Hoss	Hedda	Eileen Lovborg
2025	Jane Levy	A Little Prayer	Tammy
2025	Archie Madekwe	Lurker	Oliver
2025	Kali Reis	Rebuilding	Mali
2025	Jacob Tremblay	Sovereign	Joe Kane
2025	Haipeng Xu	Blue Sun Palace	Didi
