= Blood Ties (Nesbø novel) =

2024 novel by Jo Nesbø

- First edition (Norwegian)
- Author: Jo Nesbø
- Original title: Kongen av Os
- Translator: Robert Ferguson
- Language: Norwegian, English
- Genre: Crime fiction
- Publisher: Aschehoug
- Publication date: June 2024
- Publication place: Norway
- Media type: Print (hard and paperback)
- Pages: 384 (Eng. hardback trans.)
- ISBN: 9780593803615
- Preceded by: The Kingdom

Blood Ties (Norwegian: Kongen av Os) is a crime novel by Norwegian writer Jo Nesbø, first published by Aschehoug in January 2024. The novel, a sequel to The Kingdom, is told in first-person narration by Roy Oppgard, a dyslexic mechanic, who lives in the Norwegian town of Os with his brother, Carl. The brothers seek to prevent the development of a new roadway that would reroute travelers away from passing through Os, threatening their businesses in the town. Roy and Carl must also work to stay one step ahead of the local sheriff, Knut, who suspects the brothers of several murders.

== Background ==
The novel picks up where The Kingdom left off. In that preceding book, the brothers Roy and Carl cover up several murders in Os, staging most of them as car accidents. The murders include their parents, the sheriff, a businessman, a hitman, and Carl's wife, Shannon. Roy owns a gas station and a club in Os, and he and his brother each have stakes in a new hotel.The son of the former sheriff, Knut, suspects the brothers of murder and aims to prove it.

== Plot ==
The government proposes to build a tunnel that would circumvent the need for travelers to pass through the small Norwegian town of Os. Roy bribes GeoData, the company in charge of assessing the project's feasibility, to write a negative report that will prevent construction. He anticipates a rise in property values following the issuance of the report, and he buys a campsite from Rita and Knut, the sheriff. Knut inflates the price of the campsite by fabricating the existence of another buyer with a higher offer.

Roy plans to build a wooden roller coaster on the site. He receives help with the planning of the coaster from Natalie, who works at the hotel. When she was a teenager, Roy had saved Natalie from her sexually abusive father, threatening to kill him if he touched her again. Natalie and Roy begin a romantic relationship. Natalie breaks up with him, however, following an assault. Roy confronts her father, suspecting him as the culprit. The father shoots Roy in his leg, before Roy beats him to death with a bicycle chain. Roy stages the death as an accident resulting from a car jack slipping. Roy later discovers that Carl drugged and raped Natalie as revenge as revenge for Roy's affair with his former wife, Shannon. Carl also threatens to tell Knut that Roy is responsible for several murders. Roy hatches a plan to remove Carl from the hotel's board by gaining a controlling number of shares in the company. He tells Carl that he must resign or face termination. Natalie reconnects with Roy.

Knut arrests Roy based on statements from Carl. Roy, however, has leverage on the sheriff, based on the fraudulent sale of the campsite. Knut decides to let Roy go, who plans to leave town with Natalie. Natalie, however, discovers that Roy killed her father and she leaves him. Carl comes to kill Roy, but Natalie has second thoughts and returns in time to save Roy and kill Carl. Roy and Natalie dispose of Carl's body to make it look like a suicide. Roy becomes the chair of the hotel's board, and he and Natalie remain a couple.

== Reception ==
Steven Whitton of The Anniston Star described the book as "novel of horrific family secrets, stunning revelations, and absolutely amoral characters". Whitton praised the development of the characters and the translation by Robert Ferguson.
