= Stemmer fra Balkan =

Book by Jo Nesbo and Espen Sobye

- Author: Jo Nesbø, Espen Søbye
- Publication date: 1999

Stemmer fra Balkan ("Figures in the Balkans") is a documentary book written by Jo Nesbø and Espen Søbye.

In it they recount their experiences travelling to Serbia to write about the war that started on March 24, 1999. The book discusses what kind of a war this was, and describes Norway's part in it.

== Related links ==
- Bokkilden (book sellers) entry in Norwegian (Not operational.)
- Dagbladet's review of the book in Norwegian
