= Vinegar Girl =

2016 novel by Anne Tyler

- First edition
- Author: Anne Tyler
- Language: English
- Series: Hogarth Shakespeare
- Subject: The Taming of the Shrew
- Set in: Present-day Baltimore
- Publisher: Hogarth Press
- Publication date: 2016
- Media type: Print (hardback and paperback)
- Pages: 237
- ISBN: 978-0099589877
- Website: hogarthshakespeare.com/vinegargirl

Vinegar Girl is a 2016 novel by American author Anne Tyler. It is the third book of Random House's Hogarth Shakespeare project, in which contemporary novelists retell stories from Shakespeare's plays. Interviewed by Ron Charles in The Washington Post, Tyler said " 'The Katherina in Shakespeare’s play is insane... She’s shrieking at Petruchio from the moment she meets him. And he’s not much better. So you know I had to tone them down. I’m sure that somebody is out there, saying, ‘This isn’t a shrew at all.’ "

== Plot ==
The plot is based on William Shakespeare's The Taming of the Shrew, updated to present-day Baltimore. Kate Battista is the unmarried 29-year-old daughter of an eccentric scientist, Dr. Louis Battista who is a scientist at Johns Hopkins University. Having dropped out of college in her freshman year after calling a professor's research project "half-assed," she now finds herself with very limited opportunities: she works as a pre-school assistant, and takes care of Dr. Battista and her high-school-age sister Bunny.

Dr. Battista's brilliant lab assistant, Pyotr, will soon have to leave the country as his student visa expires. Dr. Battista devises a plan for a Green card marriage between Kate and Pyotr; Kate first objects to the plan, but slowly warms to the idea, both because of Pyotr's charming acceptance of her outspokenness, and because it offers her a way out of her constrained circumstances.

== Reviews ==
Jane Smiley reviewed the book for The New York Times. She said "Tyler’s signature skill as a novelist is portraying her characters and her setting with such precise and amusing detail ... that pretty soon the reader is drawn in, willy-nilly. We know where this is heading, yet she does a great job putting up the roadblocks and incorporating the surprising curves."

National Public Radio critic Heller McAlpin wrote: "Shakespeare, as we know, relied on numerous sources, which he bent to his own purposes for his plays. So it's in keeping with this tradition that Tyler, too, extracts what she wants from Shakespeare's Shrew and cuts his plotline about Bianca and her suitors. Vinegar Girl is a fizzy cocktail of a romantic comedy, far more sweet than acidic, about finding a mate who appreciates you for your idiosyncratic, principled self — no taming necessary."
