= The Son (Nesbø novel) =

2014 crime novel by Jo Nesbø

- First edition (Norwegian)
- Author: Jo Nesbø
- Original title: Sønnen
- Language: Norwegian, English
- Genre: Crime fiction
- Publisher: Aschehoug
- Publication date: 2014
- Publication place: Norway
- ISBN: 978-0-385-35137-9
- OCLC: 863198532
- Preceded by: Police
- Followed by: none

The Son (Norwegian: Sønnen, 2014) is a crime novel by Norwegian writer Jo Nesbø. It is the second stand-alone crime novel by Nesbø, following Headhunters (2008).

== Plot ==
Sonny Lofthus is serving time for crimes he did not commit. As payment, he receives a steady supply of drugs to satisfy his addiction. His life changes completely when he learns the truth about his father's death.

== Inspiration ==
Nesbø started work on The Son during Good Friday in 2012. The plot is inspired by the Bible.

== Adaptation ==
An HBO limited series based on the novel was set to be directed by Denis Villeneuve (though he dropped out of the project in 2024 due to creative differences) and produced by Jake Gyllenhaal and Riva Marker's Nine Stories Productions and Michel Litvak's Bold Films, with Jo Nesbø executive producing it alongside Niclas Salomonsson. In 2020, Lenore Zion, Jonathan Nolan, and Lisa Joy were announced as co-showrunners.
