= Robert Ferguson (author) =

English and Norwegian biographer, dramatist, novelist, translator (born 1948)

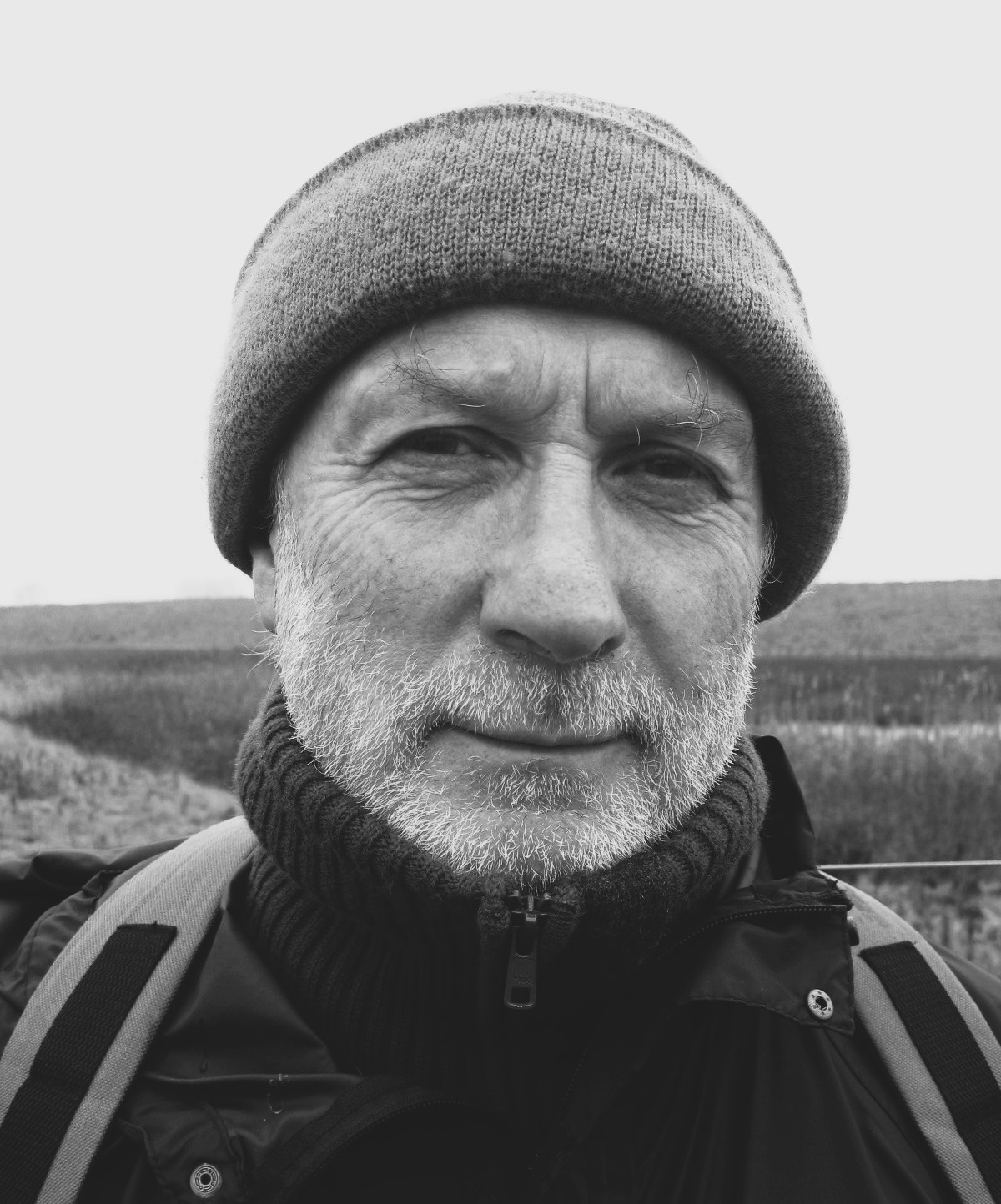
- Born: Robert Ferguson; 2 June 1948 (age 78); Newcastle-under-Lyme, Staffordshire, England, U.K.
- Education: University College London
- Occupations: Biographer, dramatist, novelist, translator
- Website: robertferguson.org

Robert Ferguson (born 2 June 1948) is an English-born Norwegian biographer, dramatist, novelist, and translator who specialises in the history and culture of the Scandinavian countries, and Norway in particular.

== Life and work ==
Robert Ferguson was born in Newcastle-under-Lyme, Staffordshire, and grew up in Blackpool, Lancashire. Between 1968 and 1976, he travelled widely in the UK and worked at numerous jobs, including postman, builder's labourer, trawler fisherman, hospital porter and factory hand. He also spent periods living in France and Denmark.

Between 1976 and 1980, he studied Scandinavian literature at University College London, specialising in Norwegian literature.

In 1980, Ferguson made his debut as a dramatist with an adaptation for BBC Radio 3 of Knut Hamsun's 1890 novel Hunger.

In 1983, Ferguson was awarded a one-year State Scholarship by the Norwegian government. He has been a permanent resident of Norway since that time. He became a Norwegian citizen in 2018.

Ferguson has written ten original radio plays and adapted for radio works by Hamsun, Henrik Ibsen, Halldor Laxness, A.R. Luria and Elmore Leonard, all for the BBC. For his original dramas he has twice won Giles Cooper Awards for Best Radio Drama of the Year. He is the author of two novels, Siste kjærlighet and Fleetwood, published in Norway only.

Enigma. The Life of Knut Hamsun, won the University of London's J.G. Robertson Prize in 1987 and was shortlisted for the Los Angeles Times Best Biography in 1987. Enigma, under its Norwegian title Gåten Knut Hamsun, was dramatised as a six-part television series in 1996 by NRK (Norwegian State Broadcasting) and was the basis for a feature film of the same name.

In 1997, Ferguson selected, translated and introduced Tales of Love and Loss, a collection of twenty of Hamsun's short stories. He has also translated books by numerous Norwegian writers, including Jo Nesbo and Lars Mytting, whose Norwegian Wood. Chopping, Stacking and Drying Wood the Scandinavian Way won the British Book Industry Award for Best Non-Fiction Book of 2016.

== Bibliography ==
- — (1985). "Transfigured Night". Best Radio Plays of 1984. Methuen. ISBN 0413584305. (radio drama)
- — (1987). "Dreams, Secrets, Beautiful Lies". Best Radio Plays of 1986. Methuen. ISBN 0413157709. (radio drama)
- — (1989). Gåten Knut Hamsun [Enigma. The Life of Knut Hamsun] (in Norwegian). Oslo: Dreyer. ISBN 82-09-10470-5.
- — (1991). Henry Miller. A Life (in Norwegian). Cappelen. ISBN 82-02-12940-0.
- — (1996). Henrik Ibsen. A New Biography (in Norwegian). Oslo: Cappelen. ISBN 82-02-13335-1.
- — (1999). Dr. Ibsens gjengangere (in Norwegian). CoMedia Forlag. ISBN 82-7530-029-0. (radio drama)
- — (2002). Siste kjærlighet (in Norwegian). Oslo: Cappelen. ISBN 82-02-21963-9.
- — (2002). The Short Sharp Life of T.E. Hulme. London: Allen Lane. ISBN 0-7139-9490-8.
- — (2004). Fleetwood (in Norwegian). Cappelen. ISBN 82-02-23615-0.
- — (2005). Respekt (in Norwegian). Oslo: Solum. ISBN 82-560-1482-2. (radio drama)
- — (2006). Ibsen på film [Ibsen on Film].
- — (2010). The Hammer and the Cross. A New History of the Vikings. London: Penguin UK. ISBN 978-0-14-101775-4.
- — (15 July 2015). Kierkegaard. Great Thinkers on Modern Life. New York; London: Pegasus Books. ISBN 978-1-60598-804-7. OCLC 892878673.
- — (10 August 2017). Scandinavians: In Search of the Soul of the North. Head of Zeus. ISBN 978-1-78185-895-0.
- — (2019). The Cabin in the Mountains. A Norwegian Odyssey. London: Head of Zeus. ISBN 978-1-78669-676-2.
- — (2025). Norway's War. A People's Struggle Against Nazi Tyranny. Head of Zeus. ISBN 978-18-01-10482-1.
