= Karusellmusikk =

Collection of short stories by Norwegian writer Jo Nesbø

First edition

Karusellmusikk is a 2001 collection of short stories by Norwegian writer Jo Nesbø.
