= Jacob Tremblay =

Canadian actor (born 2006)

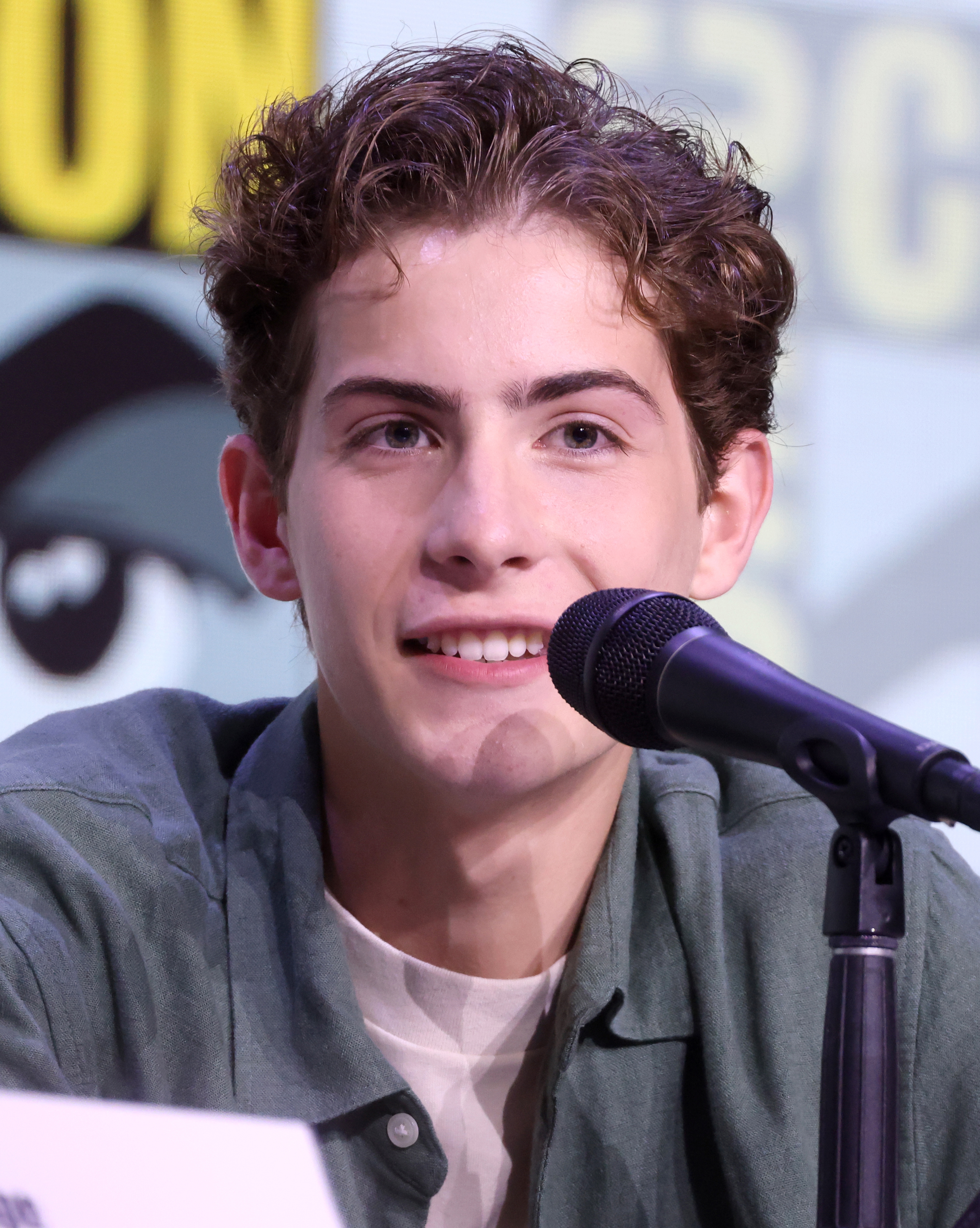
- Tremblay in 2025
- Born: October 5, 2006 (age 20); Vancouver, British Columbia, Canada
- Occupation: Actor
- Years active: 2013–present
- Relatives: Emma Tremblay (sister)

Jacob Tremblay (/ˈtrɒmbleɪ/ TROM-blay; born October 5, 2006) is a Canadian actor. Beginning his career as a child actor in the 2010s, he expanded to voice acting in mainstream animated media and mature roles in independent films.

Tremblay first gained recognition for his role as a child born in captivity in Room (2015), for which he won the Critics' Choice Movie Award for Best Young Performer and became the youngest nominee for the Actor Award for Outstanding Performance by a Male Actor in a Supporting Role. Continued recognition came from his roles as a child with Treacher Collins Syndrome in the drama Wonder (2017) and a naive sixth grader in the comedy Good Boys (2019).

Tremblay has taken on voice roles as Damian Wayne / Robin in Harley Quinn (2019), the title characters in Luca (2021) and Orion and the Dark (2024), which earned him an Emmy Award, Flounder in The Little Mermaid (2023), and Curtis in Wildwood (2026). He returned to live-action projects with more mature roles in the biographical crime films Sovereign (2025), which earned him an Independent Spirit Award nomination, and Unabomber (2026), in which he portrayed the titular domestic terrorist.

== Early life ==
Tremblay, the middle of three children, was born on October 5, 2006, in Vancouver, British Columbia. His father is a police detective. Tremblay's sisters are actresses Erica and Emma Tremblay. His maternal grandfather is Chilean.

== Career ==
=== 2013–2016: early roles and breakthrough ===
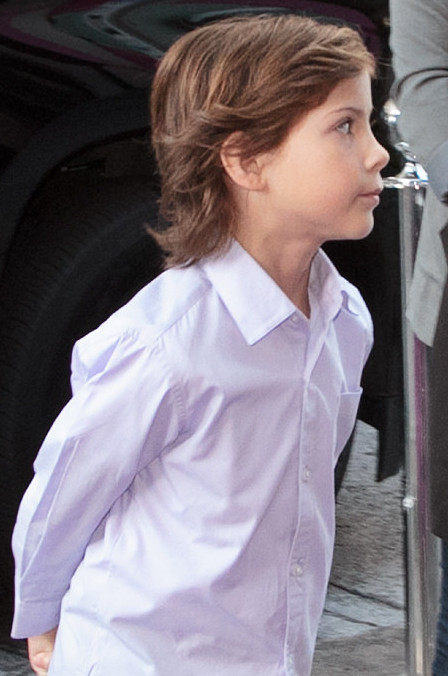
Tremblay at the 2015 Toronto International Film Festival

Tremblay began acting in television roles. He made his film debut in The Smurfs 2, released in 2013. Tremblay portrayed Jack Newsome in the critically acclaimed drama film Room, co-starring with Brie Larson. The film, directed by Lenny Abrahamson, premiered on September 4, 2015, at the Telluride Film Festival, and was released in cinemas on October 16, 2015. For his performance, he was nominated for the 2015 Screen Actors Guild Award for Outstanding Performance by a Male Actor in a Supporting Role, becoming the youngest actor nominated for that award and the second-youngest in all categories.

In 2016, Tremblay played a supporting role in the comedy film Donald Trump's The Art of the Deal: The Movie; and guest-starred as the younger version of the main character, Phil Miller, on Fox's post-apocalyptic comedy series The Last Man on Earth. That same year, he starred in the horror film Before I Wake, with Kate Bosworth and Thomas Jane, and played a supporting role in the psychological thriller Shut In, alongside Naomi Watts, and co-starring Oliver Platt, and directed by Farren Blackburn. He also portrayed Wes Firth in the adventure comedy-drama Burn Your Maps, starring with Vera Farmiga and Marton Csokas.

=== 2017–present: dramas and animation roles ===
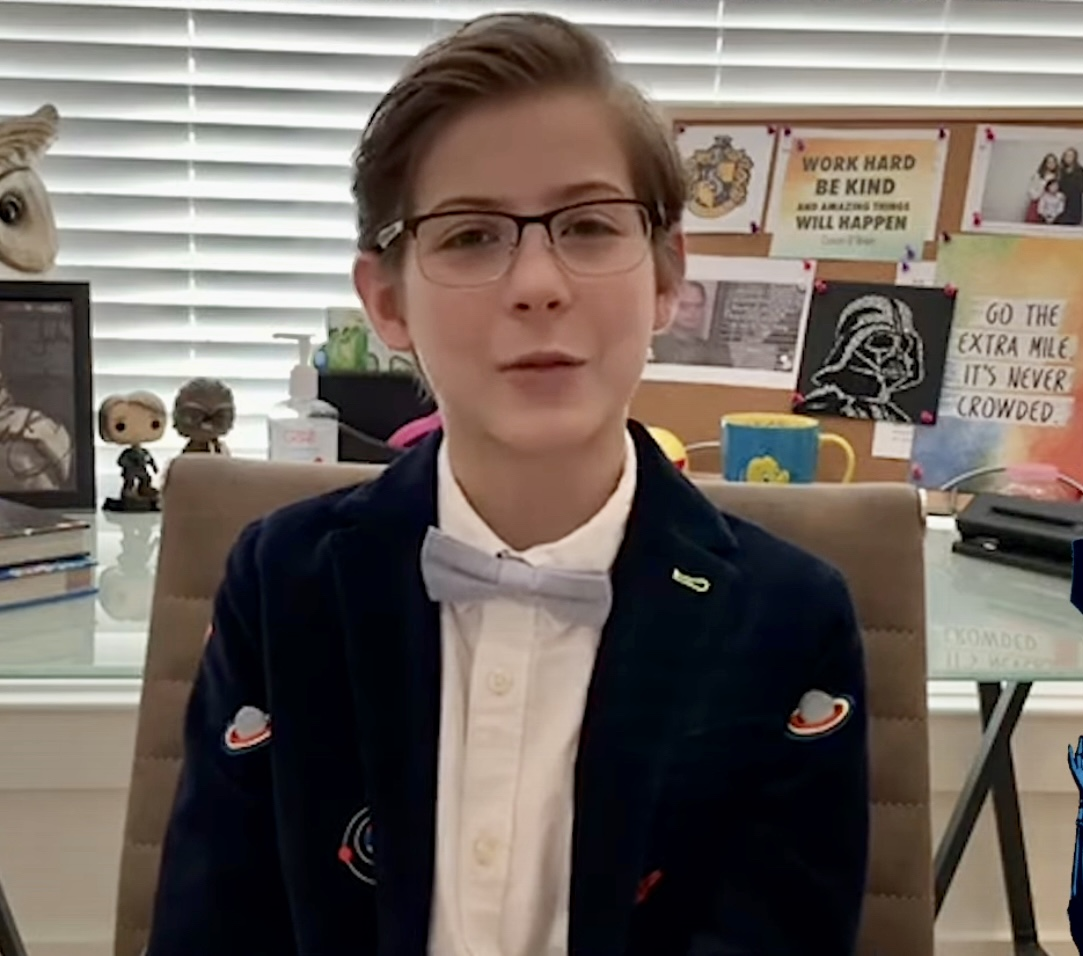
Tremblay in 2020

In 2017, Tremblay played Peter Carpenter in director Colin Trevorrow's drama film The Book of Henry, co-starring with Naomi Watts and Maddie Ziegler. He also starred as August Pullman, a child with Treacher Collins syndrome, in Wonder, based on R.J. Palacio's novel of the same name. The latter film proved to be his most successful, earning over $285 million against a $20 million budget. In 2019, Tremblay made his comedy debut by headlining the R-rated comedy Good Boys co-starring with Brady Noon and Keith L. Williams. Good Boys earned $21 million during its opening weekend, becoming the first R-rated comedy since The Boss, which was released in April 2016, to finish first at the box office.

Tremblay brought his fellow actors to tears with his cameo performance in Doctor Sleep, the 2019 sequel to The Shining, as a kidnapped boy who is tortured to death in a scene which director Mike Flanagan initially feared would be too traumatic to include in the final cut. Commenting on the performance, Flanagan said, "he's one of the best actors I’ve ever worked with in my entire life."

In July 2019, it was announced that he would be voicing Flounder in the live-action adaptation of Disney's The Little Mermaid, directed by Rob Marshall. Tremblay voices Robin in the DC Universe adult animation series Harley Quinn. On October 16, 2020, he was featured in the video for Justin Bieber's track "Lonely" with record producer Benny Blanco.

Tremblay provided the voice of the titular character in the Pixar film Luca, released in 2021. He also voiced roles in the films My Father's Dragon (2022), The Little Mermaid (2023), in which he portrays Flounder, and Orion and the Dark (2024) as the titular character. In 2025, Tremblay starred opposite Nick Offerman in the crime thriller film Sovereign, which earned him acclaim and a nomination for the Independent Spirit Award for Best Supporting Performance. In 2026, he portrayed the "Unabomber", Ted Kaczynski, in the biographical crime film Unabomber (2026) and starred in the dark animated fantasy Wildwood. He will star in the upcoming horror film The Night House.

== Personal life ==
Tremblay resides in Langley, British Columbia with his family. A fan of the Star Wars franchise, he named his dog after Daisy Ridley's character, Rey. His excitement at the characters C-3PO, R2-D2, and BB-8's appearance at the 88th Academy Awards ceremony was considered a highlight of the evening.

== Filmography ==
=== Film ===
Key
†	Denotes films that have not yet been released

Year	Title	Role	Notes	Ref.
2013	The Smurfs 2	Blue Winslow		
2015	Room	Jack Newsome		
2016	Donald Trump's The Art of the Deal: The Movie	Kid 4		
2016	Before I Wake	Cody Morgan		
2016	Burn Your Maps	Wes Firth		
2016	Shut In	Tom Patterson		
2017	The Book of Henry	Peter Carpenter		
2017	Wonder	August "Auggie" Pullman		
2018	The Predator	Rory McKenna		
2018	The Death & Life of John F. Donovan	Young Rupert Turner		
2019	Good Boys	Max Newman		
2019	Doctor Sleep	Bradley Trevor		
2020	Here We Are: Notes for Living on Planet Earth	Finn (voice)	Short film	
2021	Luca	Luca Paguro (voice)		
2021	Ciao Alberto	Luca Paguro (voice)	Short film; cameo	
2022	My Father's Dragon	Elmer Elevator (voice)		
2023	The Little Mermaid	Flounder (voice)		
2023	Cold Copy	Igor Nowak		
2023	The Toxic Avenger	Wade		
2023	Queen of Bones	Sam		
2024	Orion and the Dark	Orion Mendelson (voice)		
2024	The Life of Chuck	Young Chuck Krantz		
2025	Sovereign	Joe Kane		
2026	Unabomber	Ted Kaczynski		
2026	Wildwood	Curtis Mehlberg (voice)		
TBA	The Skeleton Tree †	Frank	Post-production	
TBA	The Night House †	Young Richard	Post-production	
TBA	4 X 4: The Event †		Post-production	

=== Television ===
Year	Title	Role	Notes	Ref.
2013	Motive	Riley Stanwyck	Episode: "Undertow"	
2013	Mr. Young	Young Tater	Episode: "Mr. Finale Part 1"	
2014	My Mother's Future Husband	Connor	Television film	
2016	The Last Man on Earth	Young Phil Miller	Episode: "Pitch Black"	
2016	Billy on the Street	Himself	Episode: "Billy's Holiday Wonderland With Jacob Tremblay"	
2017	American Dad!	Young Charles Lindbergh (voice)	Episode: "Fight and Flight"	
2017–2022	Pete the Cat	Pete the Cat (voice)	Main role	
2018	Animals	Nuke (voice)	Episode: "Roachella"	
2019	The Twilight Zone	Oliver Foley	Episode: "The Wunderkind"	
2019–present	Harley Quinn	Damian Wayne / Robin (voice)	Recurring role	
2023	Invincible	Prince Lizard, Phase Two (voice)	Episode: "Atom Eve"	

=== Music video ===
Year	Title	Artist
2020	"Lonely"	Justin Bieber and Benny Blanco

== Awards and nominations ==
Award	Year (Note: Represents year ceremony was held. Where available, year is linked to the article for that specific ceremony.)	Category	Work	Result	Ref.
Astra TV Awards	2024	Best Voice-Over Performance	Orion and the Dark	Nominated	
Austin Film Critics Association	2015	Best Actor	Room	Nominated	
Austin Film Critics Association	2015	Breakthrough Artist Award	Room	Won	
Awards Circuit Community	2015	Best Actor in a Leading Role	Room	Nominated	
Central Ohio Film Critics Association	2016	Best Actor	Room	Nominated	
Central Ohio Film Critics Association	2016	Best Breakthrough Film Artist	Room	Nominated	
Chicago Film Critics Association	2015	Most Promising Performer	Room	Won	
Children's and Family Emmy Awards	2025	Outstanding Younger Voice Performer in a Preschool, Children's or Young Teen Program	Orion and the Dark	Won	
Critics' Choice Movie Awards	2016	Best Young Actor/Actress	Room	Won	
Critics' Choice Movie Awards	2018	Best Young Actor/Actress	Wonder	Nominated	
Detroit Film Critics Society	2015	Best Breakthrough Performance	Room	Nominated	
Detroit Film Critics Society	2015	Best Supporting Actor	Room	Nominated	
Dorian Awards	2016	Rising Star of the Year	Room	Nominated	
Empire Awards	2016	Best Male Newcomer	Room	Nominated	
Florida Film Critics Circle	2015	Pauline Kael Breakout Award	Room	Nominated	
Georgia Film Critics Association	2016	Breakthrough Award	Room	Nominated	
Georgia Film Critics Association	2016	Best Supporting Actor	Room	Nominated	
Gold Derby Film Awards	2016	Best Breakthrough Performer	Room	Nominated	
Gold Derby Film Awards	2016	Best Lead Actor	Room	Nominated	
Hollywood Critics Association	2021	Best Animated or VSX Performance	Luca	Nominated	
Independent Spirit Awards	2026	Best Supporting Performance	Sovereign	Nominated	
Indiana Film Journalists Association	2015	Best Actor	Room	Won	
International Cinephile Society	2016	Best Actor	Room	Nominated	
Irish Film and Television Awards	2016	Best International Actor	Room	Nominated	
Las Vegas Film Critics Society	2015	Youth in Film	Room	Won	
Las Vegas Film Critics Society	2017	Youth in Film	Wonder	Runner-up	
Los Angeles Online Film Critics Society	2017	Best Actor or Actress 23 and Under	Wonder	Nominated	
Music City Film Critics Association	2020	Best Young Actor	Good Boys	Nominated	
National Board of Review	2015	Best Breakthrough Performance	Room	Won	
Nevada Film Critics Society	2015	Best Youth Performance	Room	Won	
Online Film and Television Association	2016	Best Breakthrough Performance: Male	Room	Won	
Online Film and Television Association	2016	Best Youth Performance	Room	Won	
Online Film and Television Association	2018	Best Youth Performance	Wonder	Nominated	
Phoenix Critics Circle	2015	Best Supporting Actor	Room	Nominated	
Phoenix Film Critics Society	2015	Best Breakthrough Performance	Room	Nominated	
Phoenix Film Critics Society	2015	Best Performance by a Youth	Room	Won	
Phoenix Film Critics Society	2017	Best Performance by a Youth	Wonder	Nominated	
San Diego Film Critics Society	2015	Best Actor	Room	Nominated	
San Diego Film Critics Society	2015	Best Breakthrough Artist	Room	Won	
Satellite Awards	2016	Breakthrough Performance Award	Room	Won	
Saturn Awards	2022	Best Performance by a Younger Actor	Luca	Nominated	
Screen Actors Guild Awards	2016	Outstanding Actor in a Supporting Role	Room	Nominated	
Seattle Film Critics Society	2017	Best Youth Performance	Wonder	Nominated	
Vancouver Film Critics Circle	2015	Best Actor in Canadian Film	Room	Won	
Village Voice Film Poll	2015	Best Supporting Actor	Room	Nominated	
Washington D.C. Area Film Critics Association	2015	Best Youth Performance	Room	Won	
Washington D.C. Area Film Critics Association	2017	Best Youth Performance	Wonder	Nominated	
Washington D.C. Area Film Critics Association	2021	Best Voice Performance	Luca	Nominated	
