= The Redbreast =

2000 novel by Jo Nesbø

- First edition (Norwegian)
- Author: Jo Nesbø
- Original title: Rødstrupe
- Translator: Don Bartlett
- Language: Norwegian, English
- Series: Harry Hole (#3)
- Genre: Crime fiction
- Publisher: Aschehoug
- Publication date: 2000
- Publication place: Norway (some scenes in Austria, South Africa, and Sweden)
- English publication date: December 2007
- Media type: Print (hard and paperback)
- Pages: 450 (Eng. hardback trans.)
- ISBN: 1-84343-217-X (Eng. trans.)
- OCLC: 67375284
- Preceded by: Cockroaches
- Followed by: Nemesis

The Redbreast (Norwegian: Rødstrupe, 2000) is a crime novel by Norwegian writer Jo Nesbø, the third in the Harry Hole series (although the first in the series to be available in English).

A large part of the book is laid at the time of the Second World War – specifically, the Siege of Leningrad, wartime Vienna and the Bombing of Hamburg – making The Redbreast a war novel as well as a crime novel. The book touches deeply on the still highly sensitive issue of Norwegian Collaboration with the Nazis and specifically the voluntary recruitment of Norwegians to the Waffen SS.

The novel was voted Best Norwegian Crime Novel ever. Upon translation into English, by Don Bartlett, the novel was shortlisted for the Crime Writers' Association Duncan Lawrie International Dagger.

== Synopsis ==
During the Siege of Leningrad, a small group of Norwegian Waffen-SS volunteers are manning trenches just a short distance from the western lines. One of their number, Daniel Gudeson, is shot through the head and killed when he stands up to celebrate midnight on New Year's Eve. His body and face are covered up and he is laid to wait for a burial committee the following day. That same night, another soldier named Sindre Fauke disappears, believed to have defected to the Red Army. Oddly, later that night, Gudeson's body mysteriously reappears in the trench. After a hand grenade lands the soldiers in hospital, one of them, under the guise of "Uriah", falls in love with a nurse. After an unsuccessful attempt to elope, the two are separated.

Decades later, when the U.S. President visits Oslo for an Israeli-Palestinian peace conference, policeman Harry Hole is assigned to the security detail. After shooting a suspected assassin during the approach of the President's convoy, Hole is promoted to inspector and investigates a crime involving a very expensive sniper rifle. In addition, a group of neo-Nazis — with which Hole has a prior history — is suspected in the murder of an elderly drunkard. Hole and his colleague, Ellen Gjelten, hear of a man connected to arms dealings called 'The Prince' and set out to learn his identity. Hole shares a mutual attraction with a colleague named Rakel, who is reluctant to take things further due to a custody battle for her son, Oleg; unbeknownst to her and Hole, the matter is being orchestrated by Rakel's superior, who is also infatuated with her.

Ellen accidentally discovers the identity of The Prince, but she is murdered by Sverre Olsen, one of the neo-Nazis, before she can identify him to Hole. When Hole and his new assistant, Halvorsen, attempt to arrest Olsen, they discover that another police inspector, Tom Waaler, has apparently shot him in self defence. When Rakel's superior and an elderly woman named Signe Juul are both murdered by the sniper rifle, Hole finds a link between the killings and Norwegian collaborators during the Nazi occupation. He also realizes that the killer has a split personality, with the second personality being that of Daniel Gudeson. Hole is led to believe that Juul's husband Even, who was obsessed with Gudeson, is behind the killings. However, Hole finds that Even has apparently committed suicide in an attempt to stop his "other personality" from continuing the murders.

Hole realizes he is wrong when he comes across the actual killer's journal, in which he attacks the Norwegian royal family and other government officials who fled to England during the occupation and who later labeled the collaborators as 'traitors' despite their resistance to the onslaught of the Soviet forces. The killer also reveals the details behind the mysterious reappearance of Gudeson's body in the trenches and the truth behind Fauke's supposed defection. Finally, the killer threatens to assassinate Norway's Crown Prince during imminent Constitution Day celebrations as retribution for the 'betrayal' of Norway's leadership during the war. Hole rushes to prevent the assassination, managing to stop the attempt at almost the last second in a hotel room. To keep the assassination attempt out of the press — and to prevent any problems for the assassin's surviving family (which includes those close to Hole) — Hole's success is covered up.
