= 2010 West Memphis police shootings =

Shooting attacks in Arkansas, U.S.

- Location: West Memphis, Arkansas, United States 35.16244595997362°N 90.22077172530007°W
- Date: May 20, 2010; 11:36 a.m. (CDT)
- Target: West Memphis Police Department officers
- Attack type: Shootout and double murder
- Weapons: Kalashnikov-type semi-automatic rifle; Taurus Judge .45 Colt/.410 Handgun
- Deaths: 4 (including both perpetrators)
- Injuries: 2
- Perpetrators: Jerry Kane Jr.; Joseph Kane

Two policemen in West Memphis, Arkansas were shot and killed during a traffic stop on May 20, 2010. The two suspects, 45-year-old Jerry R. Kane Jr. (b. 1964), and his 16-year-old son Joseph T. Kane (b. 1993), were killed hours later in a Walmart parking lot after a shootout ensued when police confronted them. The two were later identified as members of the sovereign citizen movement.

== Details ==
Around 11:36 a.m. CDT, a white Plymouth Voyager minivan traveling east on Interstate 40 toward Airport Road was pulled over by West Memphis police officer Bill Evans. According to a spokesperson for the Arkansas State Police, Officer Evans was "running drug interdiction"; the vehicle, driven by Jerry Kane, had unusual Ohio license plates. Sergeant Brandon Paudert provided backup for Evans. As a self-proclaimed sovereign citizen, Jerry Kane did not have a driver's license and his van was not properly registered with the state. He was also carrying a brick of marijuana and there were two arrest warrants for him, one in Ohio and one in New Mexico. Two dogs were also in the car with the Kanes.

Upon Paudert's arrival at the scene, Jerry became argumentative, showing the officers a document declaring sovereignty rather than a driver's license. Then, Jerry began fighting with the officers, and Joe fired an AK-47.

Both officers were fatally wounded; Paudert, 39, died at the scene, and Evans, 38, died at the hospital. The suspects returned to their van and sped away. Vincent Brown, a FedEx driver from Houston, witnessed the shooting and called 911; neither officer could make an "officer down" call due to their fatal injuries. Approximately 2 hours after the incident, Crittenden County Sheriff Dick Busby and Chief Enforcement Officer W. A. Wren stopped a minivan believed to be the suspects' at a Walmart Supercenter. Busby and Wren were wounded in gunfire exchanged with the suspects and were later hospitalized in critical condition.

Wildlife Officer Michael K. Neal, responding to the brief standoff, rammed the suspect's vehicle, preventing their escape and saving the lives of Busby and Wren. Neal exchanged fire with the Kanes through his windshield using his patrol rifle, killing Jerry Kane and wounding Joe Kane before exiting his vehicle and continuing the gun battle. Dozens of officers then surrounded the van, and after several more minutes of gunfire, Joe Kane was shot to death by police. For his actions, Neal was awarded Law Enforcement Officer of the Year by the National Rifle Association of America (NRA). Michael K. Neal's truck is on permanent display at the National Law Enforcement Museum in Washington, D.C.

It was later revealed that Brandon Paudert was shot 14 times, Bill Evans 8 times, Jerry Kane 18 times, and Joe Kane 8 times.

== Perpetrators ==
Jerry Kane and Joseph Kane were identified by Arkansas State Police the day after the shootings.

A lifelong resident of Ohio, Jerry Kane ran a debt elimination business and traveled the country giving paid seminars on methods of "forestalling foreclosures", lecturing that money and home loans are fictitious, and that people can simply sign a quitclaim deed and live in their houses mortgage-free. His concepts were based on the fraudulent schemes advocated by the redemption movement.

According

According to the autopsy, officers and eyewitnesses testimony, Evans was shot 8 times in the chest, back, and arms. Paudert was shot 14 times in the head, arms, legs, both hands and shoulders. Neal shot both Kanes multiple times: Joseph Kane was shot 8 times in the chest, head, back, and arms; and Jerry Kane Jr. was shot 18 times in the back, arms, and legs. Dick Busby was hit once in the left shoulder. W. A. Wren was hit multiple times in the abdomen.

The 2025 film Sovereign is based on events surrounding the shootings.

== See also ==
- List of law enforcement officers killed in the line of duty in the United States
