= Hogarth Shakespeare =

Book series consisting of modern retellings of Shakespeare

- The Gap of Time; Shylock is My Name; Vinegar Girl; Hag-Seed; Macbeth; Dunbar; New Boy
- Author: Jeanette Winterson; Howard Jacobson; Anne Tyler; Margaret Atwood; Jo Nesbø; Edward St Aubyn; Tracy Chevalier
- Publisher: Hogarth Press (Penguin Random House)
- Published: 2015-2018
- Website: www.penguinrandomhouse.com/series/HSR/hogarth-shakespeare

The Hogarth Shakespeare project was an effort by Hogarth Press to retell works by William Shakespeare for a more modern audience and mark the four-hundredth anniversary of Shakespeare's death. To do this, Hogarth commissioned well-known writers to select and re-imagine the plays.

== Novels ==
There have been seven books in this series:

- The Gap of Time by Jeanette Winterson – a retelling of The Winter's Tale
- Shylock Is My Name by Howard Jacobson – an interpretation of The Merchant of Venice
- Vinegar Girl by Anne Tyler – a retelling of The Taming of the Shrew
- Hag-Seed by Margaret Atwood – a re-imagining of The Tempest
- Macbeth by Jo Nesbø – a retelling of Macbeth
- Dunbar by Edward St Aubyn – a retelling of King Lear
- New Boy by Tracy Chevalier – a re-imagining of Othello

Additionally, as far back as 2014, Gillian Flynn was supposed to be working on a re-telling of Hamlet, eventually due for release in 2021, but there is no longer a mention of this on the website of the publisher.

== Development history ==
In June 2013, Random House announced the Hogarth Shakespeare series, where well-known novelists were to re-tell a selection of Shakespeare's plays. Hogarth Press (Random House's transatlantic fiction imprint) intended to release the series in 2016 to coincide with the four-hundredth anniversary of Shakespeare's death.

In June 2013, Jeanette Winterson's The Winter's Tale adaptation and Anne Tyler's The Taming of the Shrew adaptation were announced. Later that year, it was announced that Margaret Atwood and Howard Jacobson would join the series with The Tempest and The Merchant of Venice adaptations respectively. In 2014, it was announced that Jo Nesbø would adapt Macbeth, Edward St Aubyn would adapt King Lear, Tracy Chevalier would adapt Othello, and Gillian Flynn would adapt Hamlet, although this last title has not been published.

The Hogarth Shakespeare series intended to reimagine the entire canon, but no other adaptations have been announced. Sometime before March 2021, the official URL for the series (hogarthshakespeare.com) began to link to a site for an online magazine specialising in anime and manga, called Anime Shakespeare, which, together with the lack of an announcement for a new title in over two years, seems to imply that the project has been quietly shut down by Hogarth/Penguin.

== Awards and nominations ==
Winterson's The Gap of Time was a finalist for the 2016 Lambda Literary Awards in the Bisexual Fiction category.

In 2017, Atwood's Hag-Seed was long-listed for the Bailey's Women's Prize for Fiction.

Nesbø's Macbeth was shortlisted for the 2019 British Book Awards in the Crime and Thriller category. In the same year, it was also shortlisted for the Public Book Awards in Greece for Best Translated Novel, and for the Swedish Academy of Crime Writers' Award for Best Translated Crime Novel.
