= Espen Søbye =

Norwegian author and literary critic (born 1954)

Pål Espen Søbye (born 9 July 1954) is a Norwegian author and literary critic. He has a Mag.art. degree in philosophy, and was formerly employed at Statistics Norway in Oslo. He was named literary critic of the year in 2006 by the Norwegian Critics' Association.

== Bibliography ==
- 1992: Ingen vei hjem. En biografi over Arthur Omre
- 1995: Rolf Stenersen. En biografi
- 1998: Stemmer fra Balkan (with Jo Nesbø)
- 2003: Kathe, alltid vært i Norge Kathe - Always Been in Norway (2019, eng. translation)
- 2010: En mann fra forgangne århundrer. Overlege Johan Scharffenbergs liv og virke 1869-1965. En arkivstudie
- 2014: Folkemengdens bevegelse 1735-2014. En tabellstudie.
