= Hag-Seed =

2016 novel by Margaret Atwood

- Cover for the first edition of the book
- Author: Margaret Atwood
- Language: English
- Series: Hogarth Shakespeare
- Genre: Theatre-fiction
- Publisher: Hogarth, 2016; Vintage Books, 2017
- Publication place: Great Britain
- Media type: Print (Hardcover & Paperback)
- Pages: 289
- ISBN: 978-0-099-59402-4

Hag-Seed is a novel by Canadian writer Margaret Atwood, published in October 2016. A modern retelling of William Shakespeare's The Tempest, the novel was commissioned by Random House as part of its Hogarth Shakespeare series.

The novel centres on theatre director Felix who loses his job with Makeshiweg Theatre, and is exiled from his position in society, following his betrayal by a trusted colleague. Having suffered in isolation, Felix is granted the position of teaching in a prison literacy program in the Fletcher County Correctional Institute. Thus begins his plot of revenge against those who wronged him. The novel's title derives from a curse word used in The Tempest to describe Caliban.

The novel had varying reception among critics and audiences. A witty, dark and imaginative adaptation of Shakespeare's play, Hag-Seed manages to convincingly create a vengeful Duke Prospero from the slightly ridiculous, and certainly more sympathetic, director Felix. Dealing with themes of loss, revenge, a life of imprisonment and the concept of closure, Atwood uses Felix's lessons on The Tempest to the actor-inmates to demonstrate the parallels between her text and the original play.

The story culminates with a "fantastic climax of dark calamity" in a metaphorical and literal storm.

Atwood's Hag-Seed can be considered an example of what Graham Wolfe calls theatre-fiction: "referring to novels and stories that engage in concrete and sustained ways with theatre as artistic practice and industry".

== Plot summary ==
Hag-Seed follows the life of Felix, once experimental artistic director of the Makeshiweg theatre festival, now an exiled man who speaks to his daughter's ghost. Felix's fall from the theatrical elite is brought about by the betrayal of his right-hand man, Tony. Using Felix's vulnerability after the death of his wife Nadia post-childbirth and the death of his beloved daughter Miranda, Tony used his influence and connections to oust Felix from his position and then have the board instate himself in the role. Worst, for Felix, is the cancellation of his production of The Tempest. A play which he had thrown himself into in order to cope with the loss of his own Miranda.

After an unceremonious firing and being escorted to his car, Felix decides that he must entirely retreat from the theatrical world he's known. Felix plunges into a form of self-inflicted exile, aiming to escape the press he imagines will humiliate him and those who betrayed him. He moves into a ramshackle cottage off the grid and relies on his unofficial, cash-in-hand landlords, Maude and Bert, for his power access.

Nine years into his seclusion, Felix has spent his time imagining a life shared with his dead daughter and keeping track of the two men who betrayed him; Tony and the minister of heritage Sal O'Nally. Following an advertisement for a teaching position at the literacy program in the Fletcher County Correctional Institute, Felix applies for the position using the name 'Mr. Duke'.

Hired by Estelle, who recognises him as Felix, Felix convinces her to give him a chance in the position to teach through performing Shakespeare – and to keep his true identity a secret. A professor at Guelph University, Estelle will not be involved in the day-to-day running of the program. However, as his work proves a success, she secures further funding and eventually organises a visit to a prison performance by two newly appointed government ministers, Tony and Sal.

Four years into the prison program, Felix now has his opportunity for revenge. Choosing to finally stage The Tempest he casts Anne-Marie, his original actress for the role of Miranda and begins readying the actors within the prison as part of his revenge scheme.

The play culminates in a drug fueled chaotic performance of the play, Sal and Tony are frightened and punished. The novel ends with Sal's son Freddie becoming the embodiment of the character of Ferdinand and is set up with Anne-Marie. Felix is restored to his former position and finally, like Prospero sets Ariel free, he releases the ghost of his daughter.

== Main characters ==
- Felix Phillips: Director seeking revenge, stand in for the character of Prospero.
- Miranda: The deceased daughter of Felix.
- Nadia: The deceased wife of Felix, mother of Miranda.
- Tony (Anthony Price) : Traitor to Felix, replaces him as artistic director.
- Sal O'Nally: Heritage Minister and long-time rival of Felix's.
- Lonnie Gordon: Chairman of the Festival Board.
- Maude and Bert: Felix's landlords.
- Mr. Duke: Alias used by Felix
- Estelle: Professor at Guelph University, hires Felix for the prison position and knows his real identity.
- Anne-Marie Greenland: Wild, one time gymnast and dancer, cast in Felix's unfinished production, cast once again as Miranda
- 8Handz: A hacker, plays Ariel
- WonderBoy: A charming con-artist, plays Ferdinand
- Bent Pencil: A "warped" accountant, plays Gonzalo
- Red Coyote: Indigenous inmate and actor, plays Stephano
- Snake Eye: "Ponzi schemer" and property fraudster, plays Antonio
- Shiv: Allegedly connected to a Somali drug-gang
- Leggs: In prison for assault and breaking and entering, plays Caliban
- Freddie: Son of Sal, falls in love with Anne-Marie and becomes assistant director to Felix

== Development history ==
In June 2013, Random House announced the Hogarth Shakespeare series, as part of which well-known novelists re-tell a selection of Shakespeare's plays. Later that year, it was announced that Margaret Atwood's adaptation of The Tempest would join Jeanette Winterson's Winter's Tale adaptation and Anne Tyler's Taming of the Shrew adaptation as part of the project. The Hogarth Shakespeare series, Hag-Seed included, was intended to launch in 2016 to coincide with the four-hundredth anniversary of Shakespeare's death.

== Awards and nominations ==
Hag-Seed was on the long list for the 2017 Baileys Women's Prize for Fiction.
