= Blood on Snow (film) =

Upcoming crime thriller film

- Directed by: Cary Joji Fukunaga
- Screenplay by: Jo Nesbø; Ben Power
- Based on: Blood on Snow by Jo Nesbø
- Produced by: Jo Nesbø; Cary Joji Fukunaga; Dean Baker; Niclas Salomonsson; Hayden Lautenbach; Mike Larocca; Tracey Seaward
- Starring: Benedict Cumberbatch; Aaron Taylor-Johnson; Eva Green; Emma Laird; Ben Mendelsohn
- Cinematography: Mátyás Erdély
- Edited by: Mark Sanger
- Music by: Nick Cave; Warren Ellis
- Production companies: Department M; Redpoint Productions; Hardy Son & Baker
- Distributed by: Sky Cinema (United Kingdom)
- Release date: 2027
- Countries: United States; United Kingdom; Norway
- Language: English

Blood on Snow is an upcoming crime thriller film directed by Cary Joji Fukunaga and adapted by Jo Nesbø and Ben Power from Nesbø's 2014 novel. It stars Benedict Cumberbatch, Aaron Taylor-Johnson, Eva Green, Emma Laird and Ben Mendelsohn.

== Premise ==
A hit man falls for his client's wife, who happens to be the target of the assassin's latest assignment.

== Cast ==
- Benedict Cumberbatch as The Fisherman
- Aaron Taylor-Johnson as Olav
- Eva Green as Corina
- Emma Laird
- Ben Mendelsohn
- Pilou Asbæk
- Benjamin Evan Ainsworth
- Ólafur Darri Ólafsson
- Robert Emms as Klein
- Felicity Montagu as Mrs. Aaberg
- Daniel Ryan as Tim
- Desmond Eastwood
- Mickey Sumner as Vera
- Kate Isitt as Beatrice

== Production ==
=== Development ===
Nesbø is adapting the script (with screenwriter Ben Power), based on his own best-selling novel of the same name. Cary Joji Fukunaga is attached as director with Tom Hardy and Aaron Taylor-Johnson attached to the cast. Hardy and Dean Baker are producers on the project for Hardy Son & Baker, alongside Fukunaga, Nesbø, Niclas Salomonsson, and Hayden Lautenbach and Mike Larocca for Department M. In February 2025, Hardy left the project due to scheduling conflicts; Benedict Cumberbatch was cast instead, with Eva Green, Emma Laird, and Ben Mendelsohn joining the cast as well. In July, Pilou Asbæk was added to the cast.

=== Music ===
The original score for the film is created by Nick Cave and Warren Ellis.

=== Filming ===
Principal photography began in February 2025, in Riga, Latvia.

== Release ==
In March 2026, Sky Cinema acquired U.K. distribution rights to the film, planning to release it theatrically sometime in 2027.
