= San Diego Film Critics Society Awards 2015 =

Annual US film awards ceremony

The 20th San Diego Film Critics Society Awards were announced on December 14, 2015.

== Winners and nominees ==
=== Best Film ===
Mad Max: Fury Road

- Brooklyn
- Ex Machina
- Room
- Spotlight

=== Best Director ===
George Miller – Mad Max: Fury Road

- Lenny Abrahamson – Room
- John Crowley – Brooklyn
- Alejandro G. Iñárritu – The Revenant
- Tom McCarthy – Spotlight

=== Best Male Actor ===
Leonardo DiCaprio – The Revenant

- Bryan Cranston – Trumbo
- Matt Damon – The Martian
- Jason Segel – The End of the Tour
- Jacob Tremblay – Room

=== Best Female Actor ===
Brie Larson – Room

- Charlotte Rampling – 45 Years
- Saoirse Ronan – Brooklyn
- Charlize Theron – Mad Max: Fury Road
- Alicia Vikander – Ex Machina

=== Best Male Supporting Actor ===
Tom Noonan – Anomalisa

- RJ Cyler – Me and Earl and the Dying Girl
- Paul Dano – Love & Mercy
- Oscar Isaac – Ex Machina
- Mark Rylance – Bridge of Spies

=== Best Female Supporting Actor ===
Jennifer Jason Leigh – The Hateful Eight

- Olivia Cooke – Me and Earl and the Dying Girl
- Helen Mirren – Trumbo
- Kristen Stewart – Clouds of Sils Maria
- Alicia Vikander – The Danish Girl

=== Best Original Screenplay ===
Jemaine Clement and Taika Waititi – What We Do in the Shadows

- Noah Baumbach – Mistress America
- Alex Garland – Ex Machina
- Tom McCarthy and Josh Singer – Spotlight
- Quentin Tarantino – The Hateful Eight

=== Best Adapted Screenplay ===
Emma Donoghue – Room

- Drew Goddard – The Martian
- Nick Hornby – Brooklyn
- Charlie Kaufman – Anomalisa
- Donald Margulies – The End of the Tour

=== Best Animated Film ===
Anomalisa

- The Good Dinosaur
- Inside Out
- The Peanuts Movie
- Shaun the Sheep Movie

=== Best Documentary ===
Cartel Land

- Amy
- He Named Me Malala
- Meru
- The Wrecking Crew

=== Best Foreign Language Film ===
Taxi

- Goodnight Mommy
- Phoenix
- A Pigeon Sat on a Branch Reflecting on Existence

=== Best Cinematography ===
Roger Deakins – Sicario

- Yves Bélanger – Brooklyn
- Emmanuel Lubezki – The Revenant
- John Seale – Mad Max: Fury Road
- Dariusz Wolski – The Martian
- White God

=== Best Editing ===
Margaret Sixel and Jason Ballantine – Mad Max: Fury Road

- Michael Kahn – Bridge of Spies
- Stephen Mirrione – The Revenant
- Nathan Nugent – Room
- Pietro Scalia – The Martian
- Joe Walker – Sicario

=== Best Production Design ===
François Séguin – Brooklyn

- Mark Digby – Ex Machina
- Colin Gibson – Mad Max: Fury Road
- Arthur Max – The Martian
- Adam Stockhausen – Bridge of Spies

=== Best Sound Design ===
Mad Max: Fury Road

- Ex Machina
- Love & Mercy
- The Martian
- Sicario

=== Best Visual Effects ===
The Walk

- Ex Machina
- Jurassic World
- Mad Max: Fury Road
- The Martian

=== Best Use of Music in a Film ===
The Hateful Eight

- Love & Mercy
- Mad Max: Fury Road
- Sicario
- Straight Outta Compton

=== Breakthrough Artist ===
Jacob Tremblay

- Abraham Attah
- Sean Baker
- Emory Cohen
- Alicia Vikander

=== Best Ensemble ===
What We Do in the Shadows

- The Big Short
- The Hateful Eight
- Inside Out
- Spotlight
- Straight Outta Compton
