= Killing Moon (novel) =

2022 crime novel written by Jo Nesbø

- Norwegian language original cover Blodmåne (2022)
- Author: Jo Nesbø
- Original title: Blodmåne
- Translator: Seán Kinsella
- Language: Norwegian
- Series: Harry Hole (#13)
- Genre: Crime fiction
- Publisher: Random House of Canada
- Publication date: 30 August 2022
- Publication place: Norway
- English publication date: 30 May 2023
- Media type: Print
- Pages: 496
- ISBN: 9781039007826 (hardcover)
- Preceded by: Knife

Killing Moon (Norwegian: Blodmåne, 2022) is a crime novel by Norwegian writer Jo Nesbø, the thirteenth in the Harry Hole series. The book is set in Los Angeles and Oslo.

== Plot ==
In this latest installment of the Harry Hole series by Jo Nesbø, the brilliant but troubled investigator is lured back to Oslo when a serial killer begins targeting young women connected to a party hosted by a notorious real-estate magnate. Despite being fired from the force and battling his own demons in Los Angeles, Harry returns to track down the murderer after the woman who once saved his life is put in grave danger. To solve this chilling case and stop an elusive killer, Harry assembles a misfit team of former operatives, setting the stage for a high-stakes, suspenseful thriller filled with dark twists and complex characters.
