= Macbeth (Nesbø novel) =

2018 thriller novel by Norwegian writer Jo Nesbø

- Norwegian edition
- Author: Jo Nesbø
- Genre: Thriller
- Publication date: April 2018
- ISBN: 978-0-553-41905-4 (Hardcover)

Macbeth is a thriller novel by Norwegian writer Jo Nesbø, a re-telling of the play Macbeth by William Shakespeare for a more modern audience. It is part of the Hogarth Shakespeare project. Macbeth was released in April 2018. The book tells the story of Macbeth in a Nordic noir, imaginary Fife during the 1970s.

== Plot summary ==
The book opens at a dockside in Fife. A shipment of illegal narcotics is due and Duff, an inspector in the police, has received an anonymous tip-off and plans to intercept the shipment. Things go badly and Inspector Macbeth and his SWAT team have to save the day. This convinces Chief Police Commissioner Duncan to promote Macbeth to the head of the Organised Crime unit, which Duff is unhappy about.

At the Inverness Casino, Macbeth and his oldest friend and mentor, Banquo, meet three drug smugglers, led by a man called Hecate. They predict that Macbeth will eventually become Chief Commissioner and that Banquo's children will follow in the future. Macbeth is surprised and mentions the prophecy to his partner, known only as Lady. She convinces Macbeth to murder Duncan at a party a few nights later. Macbeth feels unable to murder an unarmed man but as he leaves the bedroom, he sees a reflection of Duncan preparing to shoot him in the back and turns, throwing a dagger and killing Duncan. Lady wipes blood on Duncan's bodyguards to implicate them and Macbeth later shoots them as they appear to be reaching for weapons after they are confronted by Duff and Macbeth.

The Deputy Chief Commissioner, Malcolm, is temporarily promoted to replace Duncan but Macbeth admits to Banquo that he murdered Duncan and convinces him to dispose of Malcolm. Malcolm signs a false confession in the guise of a suicide note and, following the discovery of the note, Macbeth becomes Chief Commissioner. Concerned by the prophecy about Banquo's offspring later replacing him, Macbeth arranges the murders of Banquo and his son, Fleance. Although Banquo is killed, Fleance escapes.

Macbeth fabricates evidence of illegal activity against Duff, and his SWAT team are sent to kill him. Duff escapes to the Capitol, where he meets up with Malcolm and Fleance and the three decide to confront and depose Macbeth.

After killing her own child, Lady is haunted by images of babies and loses her mind. Without her guidance, Macbeth becomes more unhinged, seeing everyone as a danger to him. He captures Mayor Tourtell's illegitimate son, Kasi, and uses him to try to blackmail Tourtell into declaring a State of Emergency, an act that would make Macbeth the de facto ruler in Fife.

Lennox, a former inspector who worked for Hecate, is paralysed saving Mayor Tourtell. He is taken to Hecate in a wheelchair and drops a hand grenade into the drugs operation, destroying it and mortally wounding Hecate in the process.

Lady commits suicide, leaving Macbeth with only two colleagues who support him. The three are holed up in the Inverness. Fleance attempts to attack them from the rear, but Macbeth stops him. Seyton, one of Macbeth's colleagues, prepares to kill Kasi, but Macbeth stabs him before an old steam engine is released from its plinth and sent downhill into the Inverness. Crashing through the walls, it severs the ropes holding up the chandelier, which crashes down onto Macbeth, injuring him. Macbeth goads Duff into killing him, so that he can be reunited with Lady.

== Reviews ==
The novel was well received by critics. The Guardian approvingly noted the "forbidding atmosphere" and Nesbǿ's use of scenic descriptions as akin to cinematic establishing shots. National Public Radio described the novel as Trainspotting crossed with a Val McDermid mystery and compared the main character to Walter White, although they reserved their highest praise for the parts of the story not directly inspired by Shakespeare's original. They criticised Nesbǿ for missing the point of the story, offering too many action scenes and too little emotional insight. The Washington Post praised Nesbǿ's "crafty choices" in changing ghostly visions to drug-induced hallucinations. They complimented his "balancing act of being true to the original play without slighting his own interests as a writer."
