= The Kingdom (Nesbø novel) =

2020 novel by Jo Nesbø

- First edition (Norwegian)
- Author: Jo Nesbø
- Original title: Kongeriket
- Language: Norwegian, English
- Genre: Crime fiction
- Publisher: Aschehoug
- Publication date: August 2020
- Publication place: Norway
- Media type: Print (hard and paperback)
- Pages: 630
- Followed by: Blood Ties

The Kingdom (Norwegian: Kongeriket) is a crime novel by Norwegian writer Jo Nesbø, first published by Aschehoug in August 2020. The book deals with a suite of murders committed by two brothers, Roy and Carl, in a small Norwegian town called Os. They risk discovery by the suspicious local sheriff, and they become entangled in a deadly business dealing. The book received positive reviews, and Nesbø released a sequel, Blood Ties, in June 2024.

== Plot ==
The book is told in first-person narration of Roy Opgard, a dyslexic mechanic in the small town of Os. As a teenager, Roy cuts the brakes on his parents' car, sending them over a precipice in retaliation for his father's abuse of his younger brother, Carl. The town sheriff investigates, and in a panic, Carl pushes him over the same cliff. The brothers make the sheriff's death look like a suicide.

As grown men, Roy and Carl set out to build a luxury hotel in Os. The new sheriff is the son of the previous sheriff, and he doggedly pursues the brothers, suspecting them of murder. While building the hotel, the brothers come into conflict with a local businessman, who hires a hitman to eliminate them. Roy turns the scheme around by making it appear as though the hitman killed the businessman, before sending the hitman and his car over the cliff.

Carl bludgeons his wife, Shannon, to death, believing she had an affair with an American businessman. Shannon, unbeknownst to Carl, was actually having an affair with Roy and was pregnant with his child. Nonetheless, a heartbroken Roy helps Carl stage her death as yet another crash at the same precipice.

== Reception ==
In a review for The New York Times, Charles McGrath described the plot as a complex puzzle in which a man "remorselessly puts his family above everything". McGarth, however, reserved some criticism for the final act, writing: "The ending is sudden and startling and — to me, anyway — a bit of a psychological stretch." Writing for The Washington Post, Richard Lipez praised Nesbø's ability to instill humanity in morally problematic characters. He also described the novel as a page turner: "You're so curious about what the next episode will bring that even if you've stepped away from the book for a meal or a good night's sleep, you feel like one of those 19th-century readers who stormed the New York Harbor, awaiting the arrival of a new installment of a Dickens novel."
