= Blood on Snow =

2014 novel by Jo Nesbø

- First edition cover Norwegian
- Author: Jo Nesbø
- Original title: Blod på snø (Norwegian)
- Language: Norwegian, English
- Genre: Crime fiction
- Publisher: Aschehoug (Norway, original publication)
- Publication date: October 14, 2014
- Media type: Print

Blood on Snow (Norwegian: Blod på snø) is a crime novel and thriller by Norwegian author Jo Nesbø. It was first published in Norway by Aschehoug in October 2014. Set in Oslo, Norway, a crime lord seeks the killing of his unfaithful wife by his hitman or "fixer". The hitman, Olav, falls in love with the woman that he is supposed to eliminate. The novel received a mixed reception, with praise for its fast pace but criticism for what some reviewers perceived as awkward first-person narration. A film adaptation of the novel is underway.

== Premise ==
Set in the late 1970s, Olav works as a contract killer for one of Oslo's most powerful crime bosses, Daniel Hoffman. Hoffman finds out that his wife, Corina, has been cheating on him, and he informs Olav of his new assignment: "fixing" Corina. Olav prepares for the job and proceeds to observe Corina in order to work out how to kill her without him or Hoffman getting caught by the police. While observing her, Olav begins to hesitate about whether to carry out the assignment.

== Reception ==
Alan Cheuse of NPR described the book as fast paced and entertaining, while calling the scene in the crypt of a church "one of the wildest scenes in recent crime fiction". Writing for The Guardian, Alison Flood praised Nesbø's writing as "ever so noiry and pulpy", but criticized the narration for "always slipping in clunky asides". Flood also compared the novel unfavorably to Nesbø's other work, writing: "Olav doesn’t possess the sheer, page-turning magnetism of Harry Hole". In a negative review for The New York Times, Michiko Kakutani criticized the plot "as predictable as it is hackneyed" as well as "saccharine where it’s meant to be moving, contrived where it’s supposed to be suspenseful".

== Adaptation ==
An upcoming adaptation of the novel, also titled Blood on Snow, will star Aaron Taylor Johnson as Olav, with direction by Cary Fukunaga. The film will also star Benedict Cumberbatch, Eva Green, Emma Laird and Ben Mendelsohn. The script was written by Nesbø and Ben Powers.
