= Sovereign (film) =

2025 film directed by Christian Swegal

- Official international poster
- Directed by: Christian Swegal
- Written by: Christian Swegal
- Produced by: Nick Moceri
- Starring: Nick Offerman; Jacob Tremblay; Thomas Mann; Nancy Travis; Martha Plimpton; Dennis Quaid
- Cinematography: Dustin Lane
- Edited by: David Henry
- Music by: James McAlister
- Production company: All Night Diner
- Distributed by: Briarcliff Entertainment
- Release dates: June 8, 2025 (Tribeca); July 11, 2025 (US)
- Running time: 101 minutes
- Country: United States
- Language: English
- Box office: $63,777

Sovereign is a 2025 American biographical crime thriller film written and directed by Christian Swegal and starring Nick Offerman, Jacob Tremblay, Thomas Mann, Nancy Travis, Martha Plimpton, and Dennis Quaid. Based on the events surrounding the 2010 West Memphis police shootings, the film follows Jerry and Joe Kane (Offerman and Tremblay), a father and son who align themselves with the sovereign citizen movement and clash with Police Chief John Bouchart (Quaid).

The film received a limited theatrical release by Briarcliff Entertainment on July 11, 2025, followed by a digital release on the same day. It received positive reviews from critics, who praised the lead performances of Offerman and Tremblay. At the 41st Independent Spirit Awards, the film was nominated for Best Supporting Performance (Tremblay) and Best Screenplay.

== Plot ==
In 2010, Jerry Kane is a sovereign citizen who hosts public talks about the movement for a living. He lives with his homeschooled son Joe in their house which is subject to foreclosure, much to Jerry's protests. They are informed that they have 30 days to pay the bank, or they will be evicted. Jerry is pulled over and arrested for driving without a license or registration, and Joe is briefly held at a juvenile detention center where he is encouraged to attend public high school. During his time there, he is questioned about his father's ideological views.

After Joe is released, he accompanies his father in his seminar tour around the country. Jerry befriends Lesley Anne, a regular attendee, and the two gamble at a casino. After refusing to pay the bank, the Kanes return to their home where they are evicted. Jerry dismisses Joe's interest in taking the placement test for high school, citing their lack of funds. They drive away aimlessly as Jerry becomes progressively agitated, purchasing more firearms on the way.

Meanwhile, recent police academy graduate Adam Bouchart fathers a newborn son, and his policing career is encouraged by his father John, who is the chief of the police department. While on the job, Adam and his partner pull over the Kanes; Jerry initially reaches for an assault rifle on the back seat but then leaves it where it is and exits the car and approaches the officers. They detain him and are in the process of handcuffing him when Joe, seemingly panicking, grabs the assault rifle and abruptly exits the car and opens fire on the two policemen, killing them both. John and his wife arrive on the scene to find their son dead. As a statewide manhunt is launched to find the Kanes, the father and son flee into a local department store to purchase clothing to hide their tracks as well as more ammunition. Joe, horrified at what he has done, tries to run away in tears from his father after the latter yells at him when he briefly stops to feed their dog but Jerry stops him from doing so. As they attempt to drive away from the parking lot, they are surrounded and killed by police. Both pairs of casualties are honored in their respective communities: the police by their local city, and the Kanes by the attendees of Jerry's sovereign citizen movement. Later that night, John carries Adam’s infant son out to the porch as he stares out at the night sky with a look of despair on his face.

== Cast ==
- Nick Offerman as Jerry Kane
- Jacob Tremblay as Joe Kane
- Thomas Mann as Adam Bouchart
- Nancy Travis as Patty Bouchart
- Martha Plimpton as Lesley Anne
- Dennis Quaid as Chief John Bouchart
- Brandon Stewart as Rob Everson
- Ruby Wolf as Jess Bouchart
- Terry J. Nelson as Deputy Hall
- Megan Mullally as Beverly (Voice)
- Bobby Gilchrist as Mr. Friedman
- Kezia DaCosta as Candace Jeffers
- Tommy Kramer as Tommy

== Production ==
In February 2023, it was announced that Offerman, Tremblay and Quaid were cast in the film.

In May 2023, it was announced that Briarcliff Entertainment acquired North American distribution rights to the film.

Filming took place in Arkansas. Shooting began in Fayetteville in February 2024, as well as in Lincoln later that same month. Shooting also occurred in Springdale that March.

== Release ==
Sovereign premiered at the Tribeca Film Festival on June 8, 2025. It was released theatrically and on demand by Briarcliff Entertainment on July 11, 2025.

=== Home media ===
It was released on DVD by Universal Studios on August 26, 2025.

== Reception ==
=== Critical response ===
On the review aggregator website Rotten Tomatoes, 95% of 74 critics' reviews are positive, with an average rating of 7.4/10. The website's consensus reads: "A nerve-jangling thriller that exposes how reactionary extremism can lead to a road of destruction, Sovereign is ruled by Nick Offerman's unforgettably unhinged performance." Metacritic, which uses a weighted average, assigned the film a score of 67 out of 100, based on 15 critics, indicating "generally favorable" reviews.

=== Accolades ===
Award	Category	Recipient(s)	Result	Ref
Deauville American Film Festival	Canal+ Award	Sovereign	Won	
41st Independent Spirit Awards	Best Supporting Performance	Jacob Tremblay	Nominated	
41st Independent Spirit Awards	Best Screenplay	Christian Swegal	Nominated	
