= Dunbar (novel) =

2017 novel by British novelist Edward St Aubyn

- First edition (UK)
- Author: Edward St Aubyn
- Language: English
- Publisher: Hogarth Press
- Publication place: United Kingdom
- ISBN: 978-1101904305

Dunbar is a 2017 novel by British novelist Edward St Aubyn. A modern retelling of William Shakespeare's King Lear, the novel was commissioned as part of the Hogarth Shakespeare series.

== Conception, development, and writing ==
The novel retells the Shakespeare play King Lear as part of the Hogarth Shakespeare project. When his agent approached Hogarth about St Aubyn participating in the project, St Aubyn was between novels. He was allowed to choose which of Shakespeare's plays he wanted to adapt from the group of plays not yet adapted by other authors. The "Lear" character of the novel, Henry Dunbar, founded a media conglomerate; St Aubyn felt someone rooted in the "permafrost of power" would make a better analogue to a king than a temporarily elected official. St Aubyn has denied the character has a basis in reality, saying he was not based on Rupert Murdoch, Sumner Redstone, or Donald Trump.

St Aubyn began revisiting King Lear by watching Peter Brook's 1971 film adaptation. At the outset of writing the book, St Aubyn experienced some anxiety about the project, which abated as he continued working. St Aubyn wrote the book at home, as opposed to cafés, as he had earlier works. When he began writing the novel's conclusion, St Aubyn was not sure how he would end the book, but knew he wanted to avoid a happy ending as found in Nahum Tate's The History of King Lear.

== Reception ==
=== Critical reception ===
Sophie Gilbert in The Atlantic praised the novel, highlighting a perceived connection between St Aubyn's personal life and the subject matter of King Lear as well as the dialogue. Writing for NPR, Annalisa Quinn compared the novel favorably to other entries in the Hogarth series.

Dunbar received a more critical review in the Chicago Review of Books. Critic Greg Zimmerman compared it less favorably to other Hogarth books, referring to it as a "solid if not spectacular entry in the...series".
