= Doctor Proctor's Fart Powder =

Children's novels by Jo Nesbø

- The cover of the first book in the series
- Author: Jo Nesbø
- Original title: Doktor Proktors Prompepulver
- Translator: Tara F. Chace
- Illustrator: Mike Lowery
- Language: Norwegian
- Series: Doctor Proctor's Fart Powder
- Genres: Children's fiction; Comedy; Juvenile fiction; Action; Science fiction
- Publisher: Aladdin; Simon and Schuster
- Publication date: December 7, 2010—present
- Publication place: Norway

Doctor Proctor's Fart Powder is a series of children's novels by Norwegian author Jo Nesbø, illustrated by Mike Lowery. The first novel in the series was Nesbø's first children's book, a contrast from the adult crime novels for which he is known. It was originally published in 2007 in Norway and 2010 worldwide.

The series spawned four sequels. The second book in the series, Bubble in the Bathtub, was published in 2008 in Norway and 2011 worldwide. The third book, Who Cut The Cheese? (known as The End of The World. Maybe. in Norway), was published in 2010 in Norway and 2012 worldwide. The fourth book, The Magical Fruit (known as The Great Gold Robbery in Norway), was published in 2012 in Norway and 2014 worldwide. The fifth book, Silent (but Deadly) Night (known as Can Doctor Proctor Save Christmas? in Norway), was published in 2017 in Norway and 2018 worldwide. On October 16, 2018, a box set of the preceding books was released.

== Premise ==
The series is about an eccentric professor in Oslo, Norway who is waiting for his big break. He is soon befriended by Nilly, a quirky boy who is his new neighbor and his friend Lisa. Most people don't care much for Doctor Proctor's inventions, but Nilly and Lisa become obsessed with his latest invention, a powder which makes the user fart odorless farts. Doctor Proctor builds upon this invention and creates the "Fartonaut Powder", a powder that makes the user fart so powerfully they blast off into space. Doctor Proctor and the kids team up to deal with threats later in the series such as thieves, evil dictators, and aliens, using the powder and some of Doctor Proctor's other inventions to save the day.

== Characters ==
- Nilly: A fearless, short redheaded boy who has just moved to town. He has a pet snake and is a lover of exotic animals. He owns a book on them called Animals You Wish Didn't Exist. He also loves music, especially cancan dancing.
- Lisa Pedersen: A mild-mannered girl who is Nilly's best friend and neighbor. Her father is a commandant at the Akershus Fortress.
- Doctor Victor Proctor: An eccentric scientist who bonds with Nilly and Lisa. He frequently eats Jell-O with them.
- Truls and Trym Thrane: The school bullies.
- Mr. Thrane: Truls and Trym's dad, who owns a large hummer, and is the villain of book 1 and 5. He threatens to get revenge on Nilly and Doctor Proctor after they give the Fartonaut Powder to his sons. He is called Mr. Trane in the first book.
- Mrs. Strobe: The teacher at Nilly and Lisa's school, who is loudmouthed and often misspells words. She is, however, befriended in the third book.
- Juliette Margarine: Doctor Proctor's love interest, who he left back in Paris. She becomes a recurring character starting in book 2.
- Krystal: Nilly's mother, who is selfish and obnoxious. In book 5 her first name is revealed. She also struggles with constipation. It is never mentioned where her husband is.
- Eva: Nilly's mean and snappy older sister.
- Beatrize: One of Lisa's friends.
- Mr. Madsen: The music teacher at Nilly and Lisa's school.
- Fu Manchu and Handlebar: Two police officers, who are named after their mustaches. Their real names are Rolf and Gunnar, respectively.
- Raspa: An eccentric, skinny woman who owns a clock shop. She is introduced in book 2.
- The King of Norway: The King of Norway, who is often spoiled and childlike. He becomes a recurring character in books 3 and 5.
- Stanislaw Hansen: A man with supernatural abilities who had been Santa Claus for hundreds of years, but has recently retired. He used to be good friends with Doctor Proctor, and Nilly and Lisa meet him in book 5.

== Chronology ==
No.	Title	International Publication Date	ISBN
1	Doctor Proctor's Fart Powder	December 7, 2010	978-1416979739
Eleven year old Nilly has just moved to Oslo, Norway, and becomes friends with his neighbor Lisa and an eccentric professor named Doctor Proctor. Most of his inventions are unsuccessful, but he makes his big break when he invents a powder that makes people fart, and later a powder that makes people fart so hard they blast off into the sky. Nilly and Lisa sell the first type of powder to kids at school and become popular. Later Nilly uses the powder to get revenge on the school bullies, Truls and Trym Thrane, by giving them the second type, which causes them to fart up into a tree. Their dad finds out about this and sends Nilly and Doctor Proctor to jail. While they are arrested, Truls, Trym, and their dad break into Doctor Proctor's house and steal the rest of the fart powder, which is kept away in the scientist's cellar. Nilly and Doctor Proctor must escape from jail and meet up with Lisa so they can recover the powder in time for the Norwegian Independence Day celebration.
2	Bubble in the Bathtub	November 15, 2011	978-1596432703
Doctor Proctor has gone to Paris to reunite with his love interest Juliette Margarine, but Nilly and Lisa are perplexed when he doesn't return home. They learn that he has gotten lost in time after using one of his inventions, a magic soap that allows anyone to travel through time when poured into a bathtub. Fortunately there is still some extra time soap in Doctor Proctor's house. Nilly and Lisa must go to Paris themselves, armed with the time soap, and bring Doctor Proctor back to the present. Unfortunately Juliette Margarine has also gone back in time, and has been forced to marry an evil count during the French Revolution. As the kids attempt to rescue Doctor Proctor and Juliette they traverse through a series of historic French events, including the first ever Tour de France and the storming of the Bastille, and meet iconic historical figures like Joan of Arc and Napoleon.
3	Who Cut The Cheese?	November 27, 2012	978-1442433083
Everyone is watching the hot new singing competition on TV... except for Nilly, Lisa, and Doctor Proctor. But then they notice that everyone has been acting strangely, and soon they realize that the only people that act strangely are those who watched the show. The show was rigged by serpentine aliens known as Moon Chameleons, turning everyone who watches it into mindless zombies, and also giving them a speech impediment. Nilly, Lisa, and Doctor Proctor must team up with the king of Norway and the governor, Hallvard Tenorsen, and, of course, use some of Doctor Proctor's fart powder and other zany inventions to save the world.
4	The Magical Fruit	November 11, 2014	978-1442493438
When a Russian billionaire robs the Norwegian Gold Reserve and melts the last remaining gold bar into the Premier League Soccer Trophy, it's up to Nilly, Lisa, and Doctor Proctor to recapture it. They head to England and try breaking into the billionaire's gold-melting lab, but when they are unsuccessful the only way to obtain the trophy is by winning it back themselves. Nilly and Lisa join the soccer team the Rotten Hams to try and lead the hopeless underdogs to victory before time runs out.
5	Silent (but Deadly) Night	October 2, 2018	978-1534410008
The King of Norway sells the rights of Christmas to Mr. Thrane, much to everyone's dismay. This means that only "members" can celebrate Christmas, and anyone else who tries to do so will be arrested. Fortunately Doctor Proctor knows a semi-immortal man with magical abilities named Stanislaw who used to be Santa Claus, who is currently living in secret in Oslo. Nilly, Lisa, and Doctor Proctor must convince him to help them save the holiday. They attempt to deliver presents around the city of Oslo a few nights before Christmas, but are unsuccessful. They even break into Mr. Thrane's house, which gets his attention and causes him to call the police on them. Nilly, Lisa, Doctor Proctor, and Stanislaw run away to Stanislaw's secret base in the subway tunnels beneath Oslo. But soon the trio discovers that there is a legal document in the Oslo Courthouse that says that Stanislaw owns Christmas, and all they have to do is show it to the king of Norway and the rights of Christmas will be restored to Stanislaw before Mr. Thrane rips it up.

== Reception ==
The series received generally positive reviews. One critic described the books as similar to the works of Roald Dahl and Lemony Snicket, and said that they can help to increase a child's creativity and imagination while doing so in a hilarious way. Another described Nesbø's humor as zany, yet also farcical and matter-of-fact. James Patterson also praised the original book, saying that "this terrific book will make you laugh, and cherish your friends, and value fair play." SLJ said that "(the book) will have no trouble enticing fans of Captain Underpants and the Wimpy Kid."

=== Awards ===
Doctor Proctor’s Fart Powder was shortlisted for Ark's Children's Book Award (Arks barnebokpris) for ‘Best Children’s Book’ 2007 and was selected for The Richard and Judy Children's Book Club in 2011.

== Film adaptations ==
In March 2014, a live-action film adaptation of the first book in the series directed by Arild Fröhlich was released. It is a Norwegian-language film, though an unofficial English dub was made in October 2014. The film received mixed reviews. However one critic stated that "(it's) a wonderful and subversive kids movie where parents are good-hearted but wholly absent and the children have to rely on their own wit and ingenuity to bail themselves from sticky situations. The film recalls the best made-for-kids movies of the 80’s and I do not believe it’s a happy accident that the absent minded Doctor Proctor bears a striking resemblance to Back To The Future’s Doc Brown. It’s the type of production that would be animated if it were an American film, yet it works so wonderfully as a live action movie."

A sequel, Doktor Proktors Tidsbadekar (English title: Bubble in the Bathtub), was released in 2015.
