= Nemesis (Nesbø novel) =

2002 crime novel by Jo Nesbø

- First edition (Norwegian)
- Author: Jo Nesbø
- Original title: Sorgenfri
- Translator: Don Bartlett
- Language: Norwegian, English
- Series: Harry Hole (#4)
- Genre: Crime fiction
- Publisher: Aschehoug
- Publication date: 2002
- Publication place: Norway (some scenes in Brazil and Egypt; ongoing events in Russia significantly affecting the plot)
- Media type: Print (Hardback)
- ISBN: 82-525-4910-1
- OCLC: 52064471
- Preceded by: The Redbreast
- Followed by: The Devil's Star

«Nemesis» (Norwegian: Sorgenfri, meaning carefree, the name of a street in Oslo in which the novel character Anna lived) is a 2002 crime novel by Norwegian writer Jo Nesbø, the fourth in the Harry Hole series.

== Synopsis ==
During a bank robbery in Oslo, a lone robber holds a teller hostage and threatens to kill her unless the ATM is emptied within twenty-five seconds before the police can arrive. When the transfer takes thirty-one seconds, the robber executes the hostage and flees. The case goes unsolved until a police video evidence expert, Beate Lønn, surmises from the footage that the robber and the hostage knew each other. Lønn and Inspector Harry Hole are assigned to the murder investigation. Further robberies occur in the same way, but the hostages meet the robber's specified time limit and are spared.

While Hole's girlfriend Rakel and her son Oleg are in Moscow, Hole is invited to dinner with an old girlfriend named Anna Bethsen, a flamboyant painter. The following morning, Hole awakens in his own apartment with a hangover and no memory of the night before. Later that day, Anna is found dead of an apparent suicide. Seeing that the gun is not in the right hand, Hole believes that Anna was murdered and that the scene was staged. A photograph found near her body suggests the involvement of a rich businessman who may have been Anna's lover. Hole conceals evidence of his presence in Anna's flat, unable to prove that he himself is not the killer and believing that he is being set up for the crime.

Learning that Anna was Romani, Hole enlists the help of her uncle, an imprisoned bank robber named Raskol, to get his insight into the robberies in exchange for solving Anna's killing. Hole receives illegal payments from Raskol to fund the investigation. Further evidence, on top of Raskol's suggestions, send Hole and Lønn to find a robbery suspect hiding in Brazil, only to find him hanging from a beam in his home. Back home, Hole receives e-mails from Anna's killer, signed "S2MN". Following the murder of Anna's wealthy former lover at the hands of Raskol's henchmen, Detective Inspector Tom Waaler, Hole's adversary, learns of Hole's visit to Anna, leading to Hole finding himself on the run.

Hole forwards the incriminating e-mails to Lønn as evidence of his innocence. However, forensics determines that the e-mails were sent on time-delay by a modem connected to Hole's missing mobile phone. After Hole uncovers another of Anna's former lovers who could be responsible for both her death and the robberies, Waaler goes after the new suspect to arrest him. However, Waaler, who is revealed to be the arms dealer known as 'The Prince' from the previous novel, kills the suspect on the grounds of 'resisting arrest' to prevent his connection to the arms smuggling ring being uncovered. Hole deciphers the e-mail signature and finds that it stands for "Nemesis", the name of Anna's planned art show and the ancient Greek goddess of retribution. Hole's "hangover" is proven by forensics to be the effects of being drugged. Anna's death was an intricate suicide, which she had plotted to confuse and convict Hole and two other former lovers, all of whom had abandoned her.

Following Hole's exoneration for Anna's death, he and Lønn deduce that the robber is the widowed husband of the first robbery's murder victim, and that he killed his wife following her decision to leave him and elope with his older brother, who was the first suspect that had been found dead in Brazil. Following a dangerous confrontation in which Harry is wounded and Lønn is almost killed, the perpetrator is finally apprehended. Thanks to Raskol's contacts, Rakel wins custody of Oleg and returns to Norway with him. With the closure of the cases Harry has discovered a new witness in the murder of his former colleague, Ellen Gjelten. The witness may have seen Ellen's murderer with the Prince. Hole shows the witness a picture of who he now suspects the Prince to be: Tom Waaler.

== Translation ==
As with other Harry Hole novels, the novel was translated from Norwegian into English by Don Bartlett.
