= Cockroaches (novel) =

1998 novel by Jo Nesbø

- First edition (Norwegian)
- Author: Jo Nesbø
- Original title: Kakerlakkene
- Translator: Don Bartlett
- Language: Norwegian, English
- Series: Harry Hole (#2)
- Genre: Crime fiction
- Publisher: Aschehoug
- Publication date: 1998 (in Norwegian); 2013 (in English)
- Publication place: Thailand (some scenes in Norway)
- Media type: Print (Hardcover, Paperback)
- Preceded by: The Bat
- Followed by: The Redbreast

Cockroaches (Norwegian: Kakerlakkene, 1998) is a crime novel by Norwegian writer Jo Nesbø, the second in the Harry Hole series.

== Plot ==
Norway's ambassador to Thailand is found stabbed to death in a brothel on the outskirts of Bangkok. Oslo detective Harry Hole is sent to help the Thai police solve the crime before the scandal hits the newspapers. Starting at the embassy in Bangkok, Hole uncovers tensions between career diplomats and political appointees, as well as shameful secrets of the ambassador's family and various embassy staff. Hole learns that the ambassador had lost heavily in betting on Thai horse racing and had become indebted to notorious loan sharks. Following this lead, Hole along with his new Thai colleagues penetrate the city's shadier neighborhoods, leading to some spectacular violent confrontations but no real headway in the case.

Hole discovers that the Thai knife used in the killing had been treated with reindeer grease as used by the Sami people of Norway's far north, implicating members of Bangkok's Norwegian expatriate community. He subsequently comes across Norwegian pedophiles taking advantage of Thailand's sex industry; ruthless entrepreneurs exploiting the city's gridlocked transport system; and scandals ensnaring Norway's ruling Christian Democratic Party and the recently installed Prime Minister. Hole's superiors in Bangkok and Oslo resolve to terminate the investigation and send him home. When he obstinately refuses, they employ cruder means such as threats, blackmail, and attempted assassination.

== Oslo background ==
Only two preliminary chapters of Cockroaches are set in Oslo, prior to Hole's departure for Thailand. They are important in introducing many people and locales which play an important part in later books. These include Hole's favorite "watering hole", Schroeder's, near to his apartment in the rather disreputable Bislett area of Oslo, and its sharp-tongued barmaid Rita; Hole's direct superior Bjarne Møller, who highly appreciates him and is willing to cover up for his drinking and other misdemeanors; Hole's father, who never recovered from the loss of his wife, the detective's mother, as well as his warm-hearted sister to whom he is deeply devoted; and Hole's memorable first encounter with Tom Waaler who would become his arch-enemy—mutual hate at first sight, with their first meeting leading within five minutes to a fist-fight, harbinger of an enmity which would further escalate in later books. Cockroaches also introduces the general atmosphere of intrigues and sinister power struggles in the higher echelons of the Norwegian government and Oslo police, which are a regular feature of the Harry Hole series.

== Translation History ==
It took a long time for the novel to be translated into English, with British and American publishers giving precedence to later books of the series, set in Harry Hole's home ground of Oslo. Only after Harry Hole gained a large and devoted following in the English-speaking world were the first two books of the series—set respectively in Australia and Thailand—translated. Fifteen years after being originally published in Norwegian, "The Cockroaches" was published in the UK in November 2013 and the US in February 2014.
