= Debt evasion =

Evasion of debt collection

Debt evasion is the intentional act of trying to avoid attempts by creditors to collect or pursue one's debt. At an elementary level, this includes the refusal to answer one's phone by screening one's calls or by ignoring mailed notices informing the debtor of the debt. In more advanced cases, this includes misleading the creditor to believe the debtor does not reside at the location where the creditor is attempting to reach the debtor.

Evasion does not make the debt disappear, and does not make the debtor any less liable toward the creditor.

In some cases, debt evasion is not a criminal act. Some countries limit the use of imprisonment of people who are in debt as a method of forcing their repayment.

== The process ==
In the process of debt collection, agents are doing a job they are assigned to collect debts. They are usually employed by large companies, so the likelihood the same agent will talk to the same debtor within a short enough period of time is low.

Contrary to what most debtors believe, debt evasion is not always advantageous to the debtor. The creditor, if not challenged, is able to take all legally allowable civil action against the debtor. A debtor's willingness to communicate with the creditor may help reduce some of this action.

On the other hand, any information given to creditor or its collection agency can be used against the debtor as an admission.

== Methods of avoidance used ==
=== Denying existence ===
Some debtors pretend to be deceased to avoid paying. For example, if called, the debtor may say they are another person and claim the debtor does not live there or has died.

=== Court summons avoidance ===
Some debt is collected by court order. The debtor is summoned to court and must be served by a summons, usually at the hands of a sheriff. Many attempt to avoid contact with the sheriff and pretend they never received the summons. But the failure to come to court can only hurt the debtor. If the creditor shows to court and the debtor doesn't, the creditor is automatically awarded the case and may start collecting.

=== Statute of limitations ===
Some jurisdictions have a statute of limitations that limits the time between the last activity on the debt and the commencement of a civil suit. Once the limitation period expires, debtors can use this fact to stop the calls from an agency by demanding a civil suit be initiated, at which point they may successfully defend based on the expiration of the limitation period.

=== Foreign bank accounts ===
Some may be able to protect their assets by transferring them into a bank account in a foreign country, where the money is considered to be untouchable according to the laws of the country where the judgment was made. However, in the United States, more recent court rulings have made this more difficult.

== See also ==
- Bankruptcy
- Liquidations
- Administrations
- Administrative Receiverships
