= The Night House (upcoming film) =

American horror film

- Directed by: Jesper Ganslandt
- Screenplay by: Jo Nesbø
- Based on: The Night House by Jo Nesbø
- Produced by: Fredrik Wikström Nicastro; Steven Schneider
- Starring: Aaron Paul; Jacob Tremblay
- Production company: Hope Studios
- Country: United States
- Language: English

The Night House is an upcoming American psychological horror film adapted by Jo Nesbø from his own novel of the same name. Jesper Ganslandt is co-writer and director. The cast is led by Aaron Paul and Jacob Tremblay.

== Premise ==
An orphaned boy witnesses a disappearance.

== Cast ==
- Jacob Tremblay as Richard
  - Aaron Paul as older Richard

== Production ==
In September 2024, it was announced that Jo Nesbø was adapting his own 2023 novel The Night House for the film and was collaborating with producer Fredrik Wikström Nicastro of Hope Studios and writer and director Jesper Ganslandt.

In February 2025, Aaron Paul and Jacob Tremblay joined the cast as the older and younger versions of the same character, respectively.

Principal photography took place in mid-2025, in Álava, Spain.
