= The Night House (novel) =

2023 novel by Jo Nesbø

The Night House: A novel
- First edition cover
- Author: Jo Nesbø
- Original title: Natthuset
- Translator: Neil Smith
- Language: Norwegian, English
- Genre: Horror fiction
- Publisher: Aschehoug (Norway, original publication); Harvill Secker (UK); Alfred A. Knopf (US)
- Publication date: 2023
- Media type: Print (Hardcover, Paperback)
- Pages: 256
- ISBN: 978-0593684900

The Night House (Norwegian: Natthuset) is a horror novel by Jo Nesbø that was first published in Norway by Aschehoug in 2023. The book is told in first-person narration by a fourteen-year-old boy, Richard, who describes supernatural events that occur following the death of his parents in a fire. The book is told in three parts, each revealing insights into Richard's reliability as a narrator.

English language versions were published in the United Kingdom and the United States in 2023, with translation by Neil Smith. The book received mostly positive reviews for its unpredictability and suspense. A film adaptation of the novel is underway, with Nesbø serving as an executive producer.

== Plot ==
=== Part I ===
Fourteen-year-old Richard moves to a small town, Ballantyne, to live with his aunt and uncle after his parents die in a fire. Richard, an outsider at school, befriends another unpopular boy, Tom. They make a prank call in a phone booth to an Imu Jonassen. The prank goes wrong when Tom is swallowed by the telephone. Agent Dale investigates Tom's disappearance, with Richard as a suspect. Richard and another boy from school, Jack (Fatso), go to Jonassen's house, a large, abandoned mansion (the "Night House"). Jack turns into a cockroach, leading Agent Dale to suspect Richard of a second disappearance. Richard confides in Karen, a cool girl at the school, about the supernatural events. Agent Dale sends him to a correctional facility for failing to cooperate with the investigation. Karen visits Richard, driven to the facility by her boyfriend and classmate Oscar. Richard discovers that Jonassen also spent time at the facility. He receives a late night phone call from Jonassen, who tells Richard that he is garbage and that Karen will burn. After escaping from the facility, Richard travels back to Ballantyne, burns down the Night House, and rescues Karen.

=== Part II ===
Fifteen years later, Richard flies home to Ballantyne for a class reunion as a successful author. His teen horror novel mirrors Part I. During the reunion, Richard sees Oscar, Jack, and Karen (now a psychiatrist). He confides in Karen that his schizophrenic father called him garbage and set the fire that killed his parents. The power goes out at the reunion and the event moves to Oscar's house, revealed as the Night House. Richard experiences a powerful headache, and his classmates begin acting strangely. Big flashes of lightning get progressively faster as he tries to escape. Agent Dale appears and dies trying to protect Richard from the zombie-like classmates. Richard manages an initial escape but classmates and townspeople surround him.

=== Part III ===
Richard lives in an asylum fifteen years after the death of his parents. Other patients include Jack and Tom. Oscar works as the lead doctor and Dale as medical staff. Richard has been getting electroshock therapy for PTSD to suppress memories of the fire. It is revealed that he is Jonassen and that he is in love with his psychiatrist, Karen. The medical team discusses a limited release of Richard from the asylum, given the success of his therapy. Karen leads him to a typewriter, telling him that his journaling could form a novel. She also expresses desire for a romantic connection with him when he is later released. Richard beings to write the story from Part I.

== Reception ==
In The Associated Press, critic Rob Merrill praised the novel's twists and turns: "After readers turn the final page of the book, it's fun going back and picking up all the foreshadowing, some of which seems heavy-handed in hindsight, but goes barely noticed on first read." Sean Hickey of The Irish Examiner wrote that "while comparisons with Stephen King might be premature, this is quite an effective chiller". Hickey described Nesbø as deftly handling suspense, humor, and the development of the plot, while also providing insight into the human mind.

Writing in The New York Times, Gabino Iglesias gave the novel a negative review. He disliked the switch in the third part of the novel, noting: "By then, the reader's suspension of disbelief has been stretched thin."

== Adaptation ==
The novel is set for a film adaptation featuring Aaron Paul, with Fredrik Wikström Nicastro and Nesbø serving as producers.
