= Jo Nesbø =

Norwegian writer and musician (born 1960)

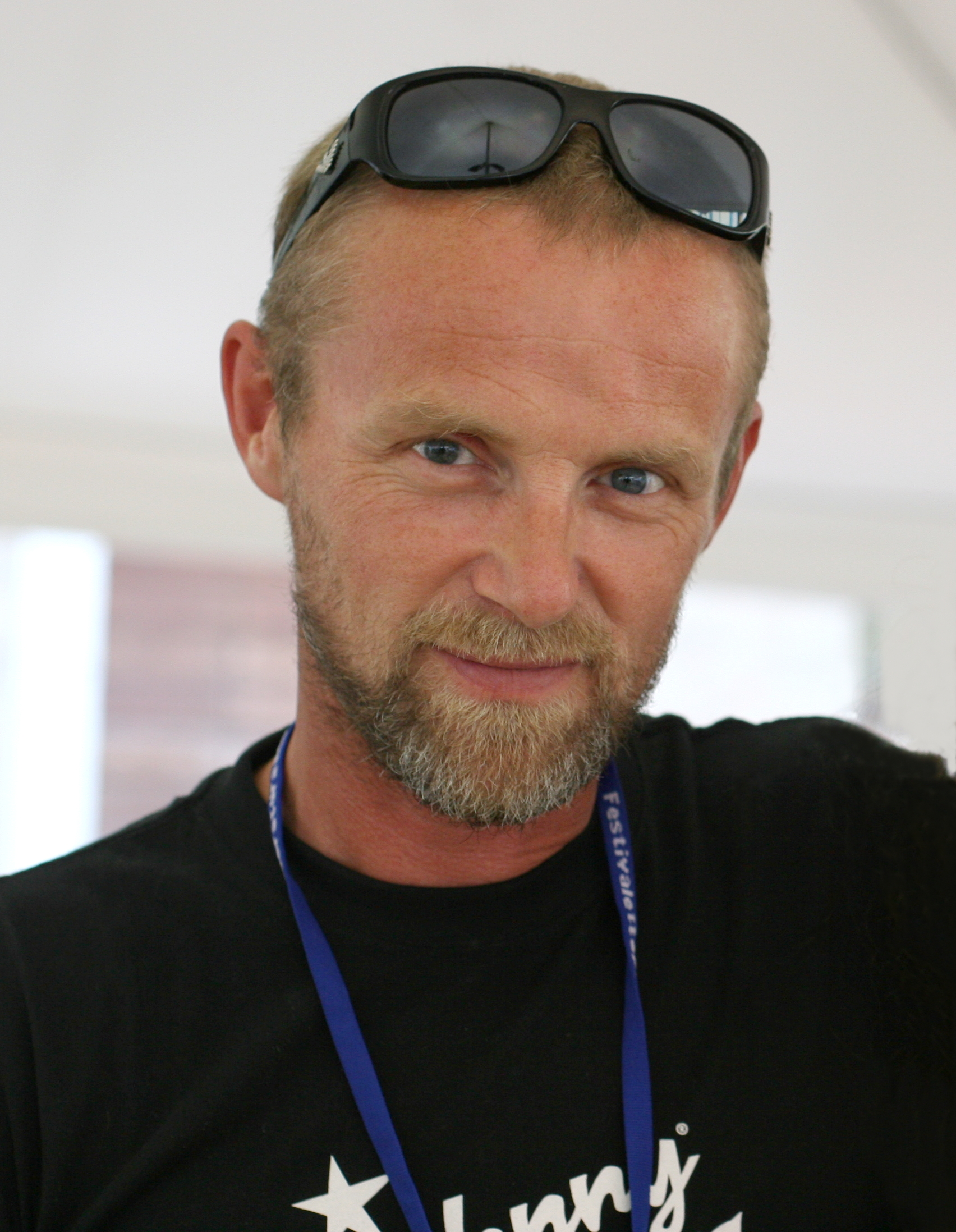
- Nesbø in September 2008
- Born: Jon Nesbø; 29 March 1960 (age 66); Oslo, Norway
- Occupations: Writer; musician
- Children: 1
- Writing career
- Language: Norwegian; English
- Genres: Crime fiction; horror fiction; mystery fiction; children's books
- Website: jonesbo.com

Jon "Jo" Nesbø (Norwegian: [ˈjuː ˈnɛ̀sbøː]; born 29 March 1960) is a Norwegian novelist and musician. His books had sold over 50 million copies worldwide by 2021, making him the most successful Norwegian author to date. He first came to prominence as a musician with country-pop band Di Derre.

His first novel, The Bat, was published in 1997 and was awarded the Riverton Prize for best Norwegian crime novel, and the Glass Key prize for best Nordic crime novel. After 1998 he concentrated on writing, continuing the internationally successful crime novel series about inspector Harry Hole, collecting several awards nationally and internationally. In 2007 he released his first children's book, Doctor Proctor's Fart Powder, which also was hugely successful.

Headhunters, the first film to be based on a Nesbø novel, was released in 2011. Since then several films and TV series have been based on his books, both the crime novels and the children's books, often with Nesbø himself as script writer.

== Early life ==
Jon Nesbø was born in Oslo on 29 March 1960 and grew up in Molde. His mother, Kirsten, was a librarian. His father, Per Nesbø (died 1994), fought for Germany during World War II on the Eastern Front. Per was given a three year prison sentence after the war for his participation, and he later worked several odd jobs, including selling kitchen appliances, but struggled financially.

Nesbø graduated from the Norwegian School of Economics with a degree in economics and business administration. He worked as a freelance journalist and stockbroker before he began his writing career.

From the age of 20 he played guitar and after leaving college formed a band with his older brother. He also served for three years with the Royal Norwegian Air Force as part of his national military service.

He first came to prominence as the singer, rhythm guitarist and principal songwriter of country-pop band Di Derre, when their second album became a big hit in Norway, almost selling enough to make double platinum. The album was initially titled Kvinner & Klær (Women & Clothing), but had to be renamed and re-released as Jenter & Sånt (Girls & Stuff) after the eponymous Norwegian women's fashion magazine filed a complaint. His first novel, The Bat, was published in 1997, one year before Di Derre's fourth and final studio album.

== Writing career ==
=== The Harry Hole series ===
The series follows Harry Hole, a tough detective working for Crime Squad and later with the National Criminal Investigation Service, whose investigations take him from Norway to numerous other countries. Hole takes on seemingly unconnected cases, sometimes found to involve serial killers, bank robbers, gangsters, or the establishment, but spends a significant amount of time battling alcoholism and his own personal demons.

The Harry Hole novels are multi-layered, violent, and often feature women in peril, as typified by The Snowman. On the return of Harry Hole in The Thirst, Nesbø said: "I was always coming back to Harry; he is my soul mate. But it is a dark soul, so it is – as always – both a thrill and a chilling, emotionally exhausting experience. But Harry and the story make it worth the sleepless nights."

A film adaptation of The Snowman, with Tomas Alfredson directing (replacing Martin Scorsese, who executive produced), and starring Michael Fassbender, Rebecca Ferguson, and Charlotte Gainsbourg, premiered in October 2017. A television adaptation Jo Nesbø's Detective Hole began filming in Oslo in 2024.

=== The Doctor Proctor series ===
Doctor Proctor's Fart Powder, originally published in 2007, was Nesbø's first children's book. They are illustrated by Mike Lowery. The series is set in Oslo and follows the story of Doctor Proctor, a crazy professor waiting for his big break, his next-door neighbour Lisa and her peculiar friend Nilly, a short redheaded boy. The ruthless twins Truls and Trym Thrane sometimes lurk in the background. Doctor Proctor's first major inventions are a powder that makes the user fart (and the farts don't smell) and the "Fartonaut Powder," which makes the user fart so powerfully that they blast into space. In book 2 he invents a bathtub that allows the user to travel through time. As of 2018, there are 5 books in the series.

In 2014, a live-action film adaptation of the first book was made, and is only available in Norwegian. A sequel, Doktor Proktors Tidsbadekar, was released in 2015 with German involvement. Both films received mixed reviews.

=== The Olav Johansen series ===
It was announced in October 2013 that, writing under the pen-name of Tom Johansen, Nesbø had written at least two novels provisionally entitled Blood on Snow and More Blood on the Water, scheduled to be published in autumn 2014 and spring 2015. The books Blood on Snow and its sequel Midnight Sun: Blood on Snow 2 were published in 2015, but under Jo Nesbø's name.

It was also announced in October 2013 that Warner Brothers had bought the rights to Blood on Snow and planned to make a screen adaptation, to be produced by and possibly starring Leonardo DiCaprio. However, on 4 April 2017, it was reported that the screen rights had been purchased by Tobey Maguire's Material Pictures and Lawrence Grey's Grey Matter Productions, and that Maguire would make his directorial debut on the projected film adaptation. Filming on Blood on Snow took place in Latvia in February 2025.

This series follows Olav Johansen, a fixer for Oslo crime boss Daniel Hoffman. In Blood on Snow, Olav has just found the woman of his dreams. The only problem is that she's his boss's wife and that his boss has hired him to kill her.

A film adaptation of Midnight Sun, titled The Hanging Sun, directed by Francesco Carrozzini and starring Alessandro Borghi, Jessica Brown Findlay, Sam Spruell, Peter Mullan and Charles Dance, premiered at the 79th Venice International Film Festival in September 2022.

=== Other projects ===
In 2011, the Nesbø story Twelve was adapted by Magnus Martens into the film Jackpot (Norwegian: Arme Riddere), a black comedy crime mystery film.

In 2014 it was announced that Nesbø would contribute a re-telling of the story of Macbeth as part of the Hogarth Shakespeare project, described as a 'crime noir' version of the tragedy. His Macbeth is set in 1970 in an unspecified location that combines aspects of Scandinavia and Scotland, and involves an Inspector Macbeth of a paramilitary SWAT team targeting bikers, drug dealers, and his police colleagues. It was published in April 2018.

In 2016, it was announced that there are also plans to adapt his stand-alone novel, Sønnen (The Son), as a film, to be directed by Denis Villeneuve, with Jake Gyllenhaal as producer and Channing Tatum in the lead role.

On 5 April 2017, it was announced that Icelandic director Baltasar Kormakur was working on a new adaptation of I Am Victor, a short story by Nesbø previously planned as an NBC television series but not completed.

== Other work ==
Nesbø played as a striker for the football team Molde FK until he was forced to give up his football career upon tearing the cruciate ligaments in his knee.

Nesbø has been the lead vocalist and primary songwriter for the Norwegian rock band Di Derre since its formation in 1992.

== Personal life ==
Nesbø lives close to his ex-wife and their daughter in Oslo. He is a dedicated rock climber, having begun climbing seriously at age 50. In 2023, he achieved a long-standing goal of climbing a French grade 8a sport route.

In June 2026 Nesbø was the guest for BBC Radio 4's Desert Island Discs.

== Bibliography ==
=== The Harry Hole novels ===
Jo Nesbø talks about The Leopard on Bookbits radio.

- Flaggermusmannen (1997) (English: The Bat, 2012)
- Kakerlakkene (1998) (English: Cockroaches, 2013)
- Rødstrupe (2000) (English: The Redbreast, 2006)
- Sorgenfri (2002) (English: Nemesis, 2008)
- Marekors (2003) (English: The Devil's Star, 2010)
- Frelseren (2005) (English: The Redeemer, 2009)
- Snømannen (2007) (English: The Snowman, 2010) – Adapted into the 2017 film of the same name.
- Panserhjerte (2009) (English: The Leopard, 2011)
- Gjenferd (2011) (English: Phantom, 2012)
- Politi (2013) (English: Police, 2013)
- Tørst (2017) (English: The Thirst, 2017)
- Kniv (2019) (English: Knife, 2019)
- Blodmåne (2022) (English: Killing Moon, 2023)

=== The Doctor Proctor novels ===
- Doktor Proktors Prompepulver (2007) (English: Doctor Proctor's Fart Powder) (2010)
- Doktor Proktors Tidsbadekaret (2008) (English: Doctor Proctor's Fart Powder: Bubble in the Bathtub) (2011)
- Doktor Proktor Og Verdens Undergang. Kanskje. (2010) (English: Doctor Proctor's Fart Powder: The End of The World. Maybe.; also known as Doctor Proctor's Fart Powder: Who Cut the Cheese?) (2012)
- Doktor Proktor Og Det Store Gullrøveriet (2012) (English: Doctor Proctor's Fart Powder: The Great Gold Robbery; also known as Doctor Proctor's Fart Powder: The Magical Fruit) (2014)
- Kan Doktor Proktor Redde Jula? (2017) (English: Doctor Proctor's Fart Powder: Can Doctor Proctor Save Christmas? also known as Doctor Proctor's Fart Powder: Silent (but Deadly) Night) (2018)

=== The Olav Johansen novels ===
- Blod På Snø (2015) (English: Blood on Snow, 2015)
- Mere Blod (2015) (English: Midnight Sun, 2015)

=== The Kingdom novels ===
- Kongeriket (2020) (English: The Kingdom, 2020)
- Kongen av Os (2024) (English: Blood Ties, 2024)

=== Stand-alone works ===
- Karusellmusikk (2001) – Short stories
- Det Hvite Hotellet (2007) (English: The White Hotel)
- Hodejegerne (2008) (English: Headhunters) – Adapted into the 2011 film of the same name.
- Sønnen (2014) (English: The Son, 2014)
- Macbeth (April 2018)
- Sjalusimannen Og Andre Fortellinger (2021) (English: The Jealousy Man and Other Stories, 2021)
- Rotteøya Og Andre Fortellinger (2021) (English: Rat island and Other Stories, 2021)
- Natthuset (2023) (English: The Night House, 2023)
- Minnesota (2025) (English: Wolf Hour, 2025)

=== Non-fiction ===
- with Espen Søbye, Stemmer fra Balkan/Atten dager i mai (1999) (English: Figures in the Balkans)

=== TV series ===
Okkupert (Occupied), based on a concept by Jo Nesbø, is a television series produced by TV 2 and Yellow Bird, the Swedish production house responsible for the Wallander TV series, and the films Headhunters and The Girl with the Dragon Tattoo. The series is a political thriller which envisages what would happen if Norway were to be invaded by Russia to seize the nation's oil resources. The first season premiered in October 2015, the second in September 2017, and the third in January 2020.

A prequel television series based on Headhunters premiered in 2022, also produced by Yellow Bird.

== Filmography ==
=== Adaptations ===
- Headhunters (Film, 2011)
- Jackpot (Film, 2011)
- I Am Victor (Film, 2013)
- Doctor Proctor's Fart Powder (Film, 2014)
- Doctor Proctor: Bubble in the Bathtub (Film, 2015)
- The Snowman (Film, 2017)
- The Hanging Sun (Film, 2022)
- Headhunters (TV series, 2022)
- Killer Heat (Film, 2024)
- Jo Nesbø's Harry Hole (TV series, 2026)
- Blood on Snow (Film, 2027)
- The Night House (Film, TBA)

=== Scripts and original plots by Nesbø ===
- Deadline Torp (TV series, 2005)
- Occupied (TV series, 2015-2020)
- So Long, Marianne (TV series, 2024)

== Awards and nominations ==
- The Riverton Prize 1997 for Best Norwegian Crime Novel of the Year (The Bat)
- The Glass Key Award 1998 for Best Nordic Crime Novel of the Year (The Bat)
- The Norwegian Booksellers' Prize for Best Novel of the Year 2000 (The Redbreast)
- The Mads Wiel Nygaard Bursary 2002 (Nemesis)
- Best Norwegian Crime Novel Ever Written awarded by the Norwegian book clubs in 2004 (The Redbreast)
- The Finnish Academy of Crime Writers' Special Commendation 2007 for Excellence in Foreign Crime Writing (The Devil's Star)
- Shortlisted for Duncan Lawrie International Dagger 2007 (The Redbreast)
- The Norwegian Booksellers' Prize for Best Novel of the Year 2007 (The Snowman)
- Shortlisted for Ark's Children's Book Award for Best Children's Book 2007 (Doctor Proctor's Fart Powder)
- The Norwegian Book Club Prize 2008 for Best Novel of the Year (The Snowman)
- Nominated for the Norwegian Bookseller's Prize 2008 (Headhunters and Doctor Proctor's Time Bathtub)
- Nominated for the Edgar Award 2010 (Nemesis)
- Awarded the Norwegian Peer Gynt Prize 2013
- Martinus Readers' Choice Award (Best Foreign Author of the Year) Slovakia 2014
- St. Petersburg Reads Award (Best International Author of the Year) Russia 2014
- The Riverton Honor Prize Norway 2016
- Boréales Honorary Award (for his entire literary work) France 2017
- The Raymond Chandler Award (Lifetime Achievement) 2018
- The Icepick Award (Best Translated Crime Novel of the Year) Iceland – Sønnen The Son 2018
- Shortlisted for the British Book Awards (Book of the Year, Crime & Thriller) UK – Macbeth Macbeth 2019
- The Riverton Prize (Best Norwegian Crime Novel of the Year) Norway – Kniv Knife 2020
- CoScan's Nordic Person of the Year Award UK 2020
- Shortlisted for the Mofibo Awards (Best Crime & Suspense) Denmark – Kongeriket The Kingdom 2021
- Francisco Gonzalez Ledesma Award (for his entire literary work) Spain 2023
- Honorary Doctorate of the University of West Attica (for his rich body of work, his contribution to literature, and the promotion of reading) Greece 2023
- Shortlisted for Grand Prix des lectrices de ELLE France – Blodmåne Killing Moon 2024
- The Pepe Carvalho Award (for his entire literary work) Spain 2024
