= St. Hanshaugen =

Borough of Oslo, Norway

Bydel St. Hanshaugen
- Borough
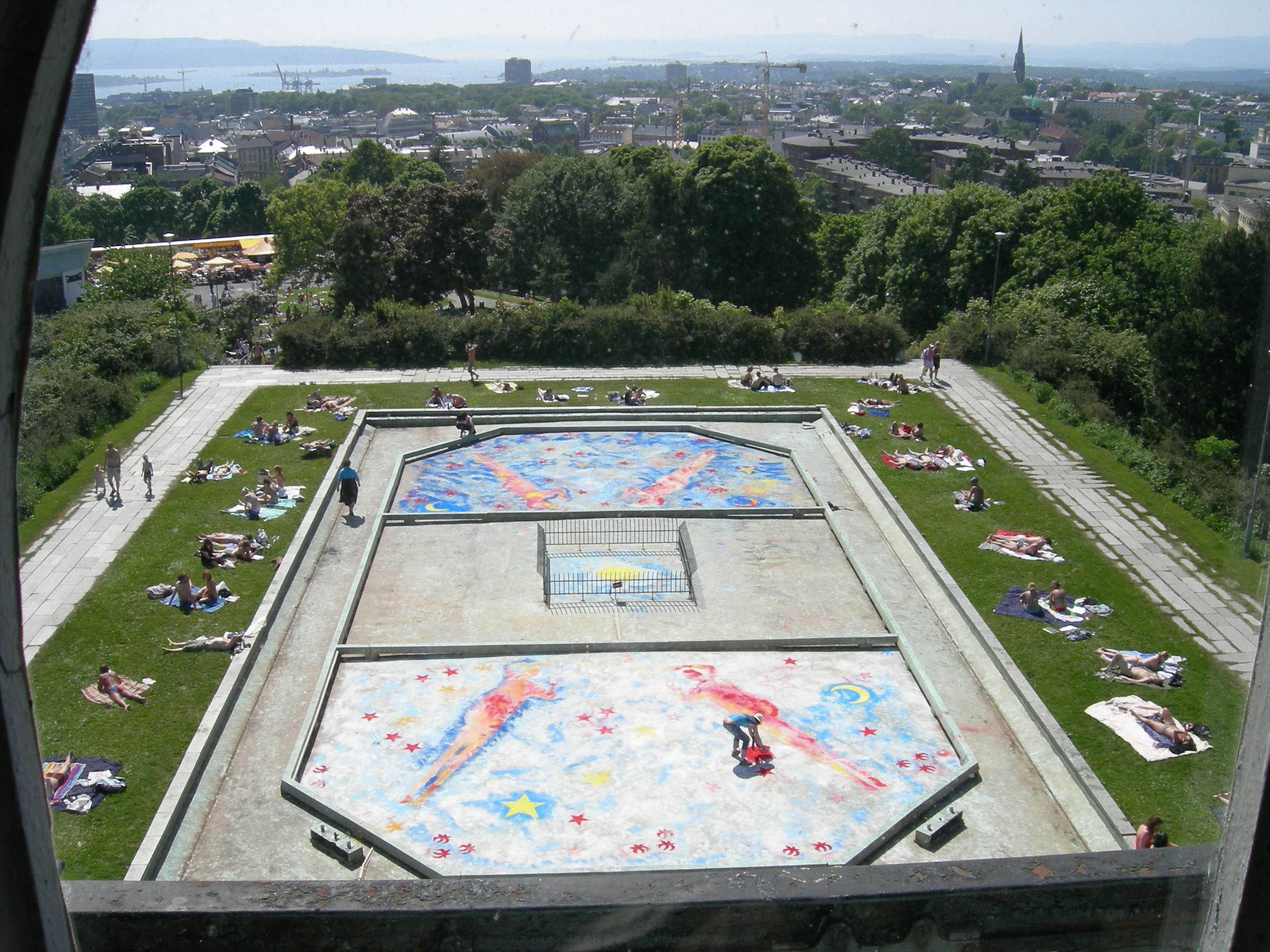

- Coat of arms

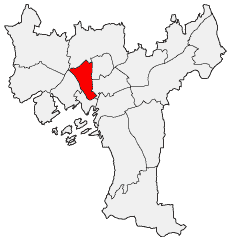
- Coordinates: 59°55′37.58″N 10°44′27.82″E
- Country: Norway
- City: Oslo

Area
  - Total: 3.59 km^{2} (1.39 sq mi)

Population (2020)
  - Total: 38,945
  - Density: 10,848/km^{2} (28,100/sq mi)
- Time zone: UTC+1 (CET)
  - Summer (DST): UTC+2 (CEST)
- ISO 3166 code: NO-030104
- Website: bsh.oslo.kommune.no

St. Hanshaugen (Norwegian for St. John's Hill) is a borough of the city of Oslo, Norway.

== Area ==
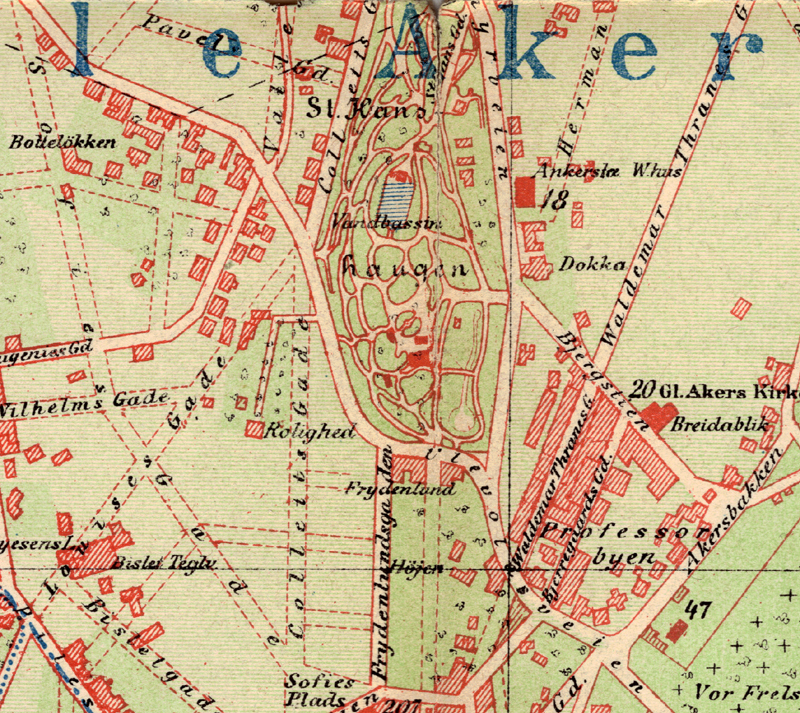
Map of St. Hanshaugen, c. 1900

It has a triangular shape, with its northern border just north of the buildings of the Norwegian Broadcasting Corporation and Ullevål University Hospital, and south of the University of Oslo campus at Blindern. In the east, the boundary runs just west of the river Akerselva, then down Storgata before it turns north, up Grensen, Pilestredet and Suhms gate.

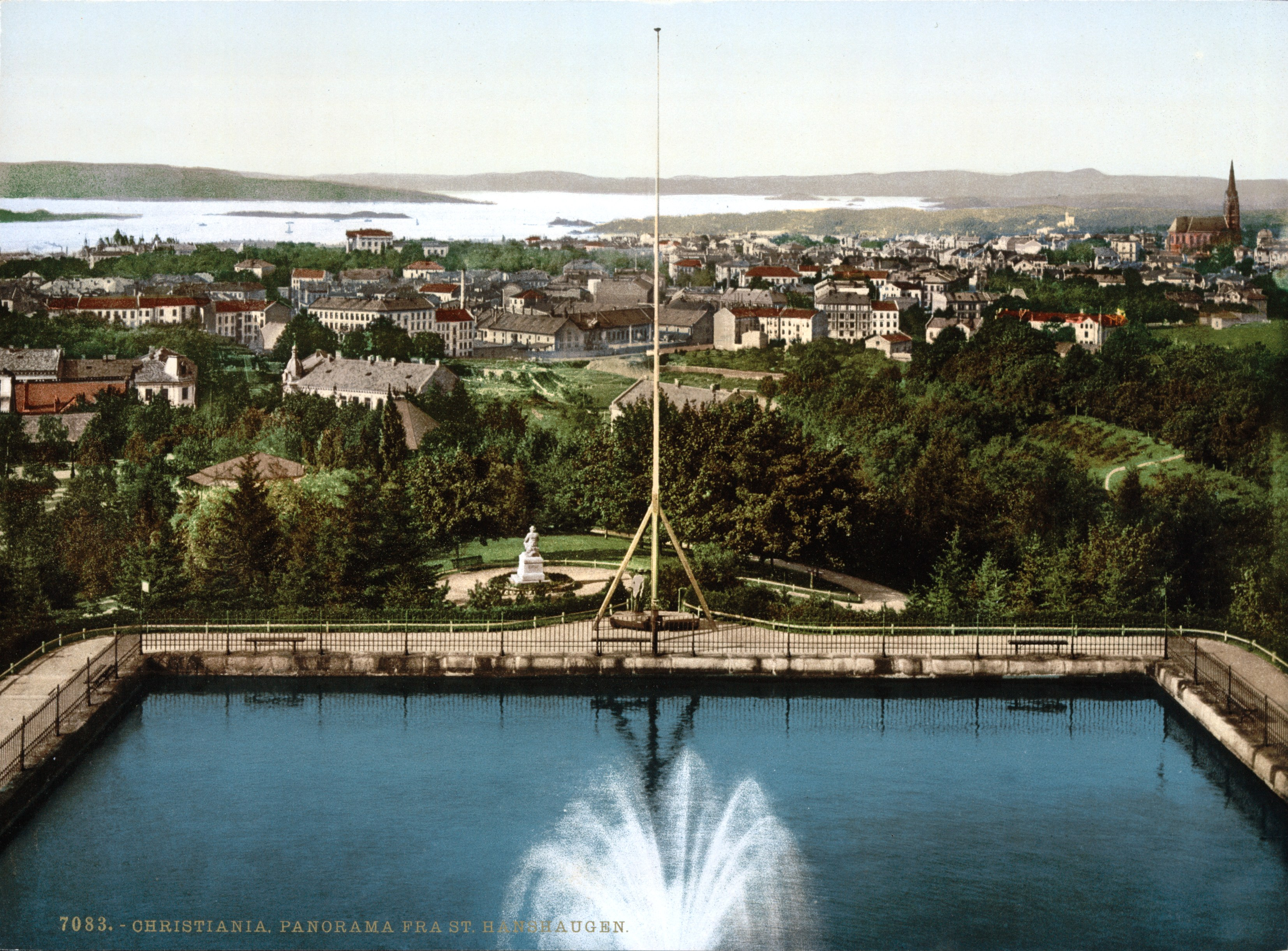
Panorama from St. Hanshaugen, c. 1900

The borough has its name from St. Hanshaugen Park that lies centrally within it, where the citizens used to celebrate summer solstice (St. Hans in Norwegian). The park was planted by the city in the years 1876–86; it has a pavilion, and a reflecting pool covering a reservoir. The neighbourhood St. Hanshaugen is located west and south of the park, with shopping, eating and public transport where the streets Ullevålsveien and Waldemar Thranes gate meets. There is also the traditional restaurant Schrøder, known for one of its regulars, Jo Nesbø's fictional figure Harry Hole.

To the southeast of the park is Oslo's oldest building – Aker Kirke, built around 1100, but restored from ruins around 1860, and then again in the 1950s in a more authentic style. Next to the church is the cemetery Vår Frelsers gravlund, created in 1808 as a result of the great famine and cholera epidemic of the Napoleonic Wars. The nearby area around Damstredet and Telthusbakken is interesting since it retains the small town character of Oslo in the first part of the 19th century.

To the southwest of the park is Bislett stadion, founded in 1907. Finished in 1940, this was the main venue of the 1952 Winter Olympics in Oslo. The stadium was demolished in 2004, and a new stadion was built in its place.

The borough also contains the cemeteries Nordre Gravlund and Vestre Aker, and Youngstorget – home of the Norwegian labour movement.

== Park ==
St. Hanshaugen is one of Oslo's largest parks, just north of the city centre. This popular recreational area is often used for walks, and the top of the hill offers view of Oslo.

St. Hanshaugen was originally a bare rock hill. In the 1840s the name St. Hanshaugen ("midsummer hill") came into use, as the hill was a popular place for midsummer celebrations. In 1855 it was decided that parts of the hill was to be planted, and a big part of the hill was turned into a park in the next 30 years. The park also got a park keeper house, an artificial creek and a pavilion on the square Festplassen, and the park was expanded. Through the years, a number of statues were also placed in the park. In 1936, the park got an open-air café on Festplassen – the square on top of the hill – which is still a popular summer café today.

== Demographics ==
January 1, 2020, there were 38,945 people living in the borough. Of the population in 2004 13,093 (49%) were male. There were 1,918 immigrants from western countries and 2,488 from non-western countries. The countries with most immigrants were Sweden (789), Denmark (272), Pakistan (191), Somalia (188) and Vietnam (182). There were 537 births in 2003, and 260 deaths. The same year 8,139 people moved into the borough, while 8,101 moved out. The average income for the borough was NOK 262,534, somewhat higher than the average for the city of 254,429.

In 2001, 59.4% of those over 20 years old in private households were living alone (national average 37.5%). Of the remainder, 15.7% were cohabitants and 24.9% married (national average 12.2% and 50.2% respectively).

== Politics ==
In the municipal election of 2007 all borough councils became elective, until then most had been appointed by the city council. Labour and the Conservatives each gained 4 seats, the Socialist Left have 3, the Liberals 2, the Progress Party and the Red Electoral Alliance 1 each.

The municipal election of 2011 changed the composition of the council. The Conservative Party became the biggest, winning 5 seats, while Labour kept its 4, the Liberal Party its 2, and the Red Party its 1 seat. The Socialist Left and the Progress Party lost one seat each, ending at 2 and 0, respectively. The Green Party won its first St. Hanshaugen-seat. This result allowed Torunn Kanutte Husvik of the Labour Party to continue as leader of the borough council.

In the 2015 municipal election, the Conservative Party and Labour won 4 seats each, though the former remained the largest party in terms of votes. The Green Party had a breakthrough election, winning 3 seats, while the Liberal Party retained its 2 seats and the Socialist Left and the Red Party won 1 seat each. After the election, the Conservatives, the Greens and the Liberals signed a cooperation agreement, making Anne Christine Kroepelien of the Conservative Party the new leader of the borough council.
