= Jo Nesbo's Detective Hole =

Norwegian television series

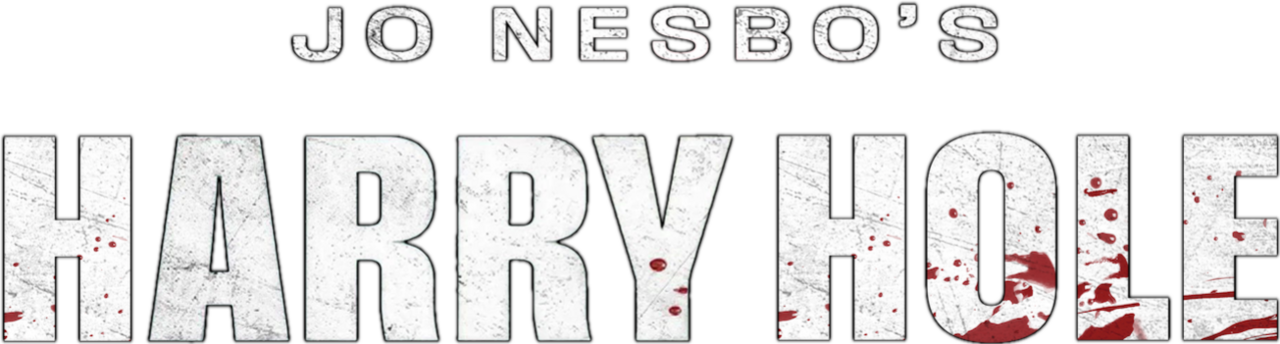
- Genre: Mystery; Crime drama; Nordic Noir
- Based on: The Devil's Star by Jo Nesbø
- Written by: Jo Nesbø
- Directed by: Øystein Karlsen; Anna Zackrisson
- Starring: Tobias Santelmann; Joel Kinnaman
- Composers: Nick Cave; Warren Ellis
- Countries of origin: Norway; United Kingdom
- Original languages: Norwegian; Swedish; Danish; English
- No. of seasons: 1
- No. of episodes: 9

Production
- Executive producers: Tim Bevan; Eric Fellner; Amelia Granger; Katy Rozelle; Jo Nesbø; Niclas Salomonsson; René Ezra; Øystein Karlsen
- Producer: Per Henry Borch
- Running time: 43–62 minutes
- Production companies: Working Title Television; Living Daylights Productions; Redpoint Productions; Universal International Studios; Green Producers Club

Original release
- Network: Netflix
- Release: 26 March 2026

Jo Nesbo's Detective Hole (titled Jo Nesbø's Harry Hole in Scandinavia) is a Norwegian crime drama television series. It is an adaptation of Jo Nesbø's Harry Hole novels, specifically the fifth installment, The Devil's Star.

== Premise ==
Harry Hole, a troubled Oslo police detective, must contend with both a horrific serial killer and his corrupt colleague Tom Waaler.

== Cast ==
- Tobias Santelmann as Harry Hole
- Joel Kinnaman as Tom Waaler
- Pia Tjelta as Rakel Fauke
- Peter Stormare as Odin
- Anders Baasmo Christiansen as Bjarne Møller
- Ellen Helinder as Beate Lønn
- Simon J. Berger as Martin Aminov
- Ingrid Bolsø Berdal as Ellen Gjelten
- Cato Skimten Storengen as Bjørn Holm
- Maxime Baune Bochud as Oleg Fauke
- Anders Danielsen Lie as Anders Knutsen
- Ane Dahl Torp as Vibeke Knutsen
- Kelly Gale as Maya Ek
- Kåre Conradi as André Claussen
- Frank Kjosås as Willy Barli
- Fridtjov Såheim as Raymond
- Eili Harboe as Attila
- Atle Antonsen as Karl
- Manish Sharma as Eddy Hansson
- Henriette Steenstrup as Ruth Nilsen
- Jesper Christensen as Ståle Aune
- Kristoffer Joner as Øystein Eikeland
- Dagny Norvoll Sandvik as Lisbeth Barli/Toya Harang
- Linn Skåber as Frank Fosse
- Jonas Strand Gravli as Magnus Skarre
- Nader Khademi as Amar Wulf
- Sonny Lindberg as Bobby
- Agnes Kittelsen as Chief Superintendent Agnes Sjølid
- Henrik Mestad as Chief of Police Ivar Andersen
- Sondre Larsen as Loke

== Episodes ==
No.	Title	Directed by	Written by	Original release date
1	"36 Seconds"	Øystein Karlsen	Jo Nesbø	26 March 2026
In Oslo, a young woman and her associates working in a bank are taunted with an impossible challenge of opening a bank vault within 30 seconds, as a means of mental torment by a masked bank robber. When this fails, the masked man whispers in her ear a sentence which causes her to panic, before shooting her with a double-barreled shotgun. Detective Harry Hole is intrigued by the case, but his inability to solve it drives him to alcoholism, eventually killing his partner in a drunk driving accident during a car chase.
2	"Ghosts"	Øystein Karlsen	Jo Nesbø	26 March 2026
3	"To Silence the Voices"	Anna Zackrisson	Jo Nesbø	26 March 2026
4	"After They Are Dead, Before They Are Cold"	Anna Zackrisson	Jo Nesbø	26 March 2026
5	"The Devil's Star"	Øystein Karlsen	Jo Nesbø	26 March 2026
6	"Five"	Anna Zackrisson	Jo Nesbø	26 March 2026
7	"Joseph's Blessing"	Øystein Karlsen	Jo Nesbø	26 March 2026
8	"The Woman in the Water"	Øystein Karlsen	Jo Nesbø	26 March 2026
9	"Duke Ellington's Piano"	Øystein Karlsen	Jo Nesbø	26 March 2026
Hole infiltrates Barli's apartment after discovering that the latter is The Courier. Barli explains how he murdered his wife in order to enact revenge for her infidelity, then killed several more people whilst leaving satanic imagery to cause police to believe a psychopathic satanist cult was the killer(s), whilst Barli's red herring allowed him to live in comfort. Barli reveals he has kept his wife's body in a waterbed as a form of control, and that he intends to enact his own "happy ending", whilst holding Hole at gunpoint. Hole closes his eyes and expects to be shot, but Barli retreats to the balcony and commits suicide by jumping, impaling himself on a metal washing line pole, mirroring the death of Nero. With The Courier dead, Hole tracks down Waaler to rescue Rakel's son and Aminov. Waaler states how he intends to kill them and cover it up as if Hole were the guilty party, but Hole, Aminov and Oleg flee into an elevator. Waaler reaches into the moving elevator, but Hole grabs his arm and pulls him into the space between the platform, cutting off his arm. Waaler attempts to follow them, but bleeds to death. With the case closed, Hole returns Oleg to Rakel before declaring that they are not safe due to his line of work. He drives away, intending to destroy the black market Waaler was a pawn in and solves the masked bank robber murder from episode 1.

== Production ==
The series was revealed by Netflix as part of their "Next on Nordic presentation" at Stockholm in March 2024, to spotlight the company's forthcoming Scandinavian productions. It was announced that Nesbø would be adapting his own novel, reuniting with So Long, Marianne collaborator Øystein Karlsen, who signed on as director and executive producer. In August, Anna Zackrisson joined the directing team.

Working Title was confirmed to be the producing studio for the series for Netflix, marking their first non-English language TV series production, with Øystein Karlsen and Anna Zackrisson as directors. Tor Arne Øvrebø is producing, while executive producers are Tim Bevan, Eric Fellner, Katy Rozelle, Rene Ezra, Øystein Karlsen, Jo Nesbø and Niclas Salomonsson.

Principal photography began on May 23 in Oslo. Nesbø is showrunner on the series. Filming took place between May and December 2024, over 113 shooting days and across more than 160 locations in the capital, making it the largest shoot in Oslo's production history.

Australian musicians Nick Cave and Warren Ellis composed the series' score.

=== Casting ===
In May 2024, the lead actors were revealed to be Tobias Santelmann as the titular Harry Hole, Joel Kinnaman as dirty cop Tom Waaler and Pia Tjelta as Rakel Fauke, Harry's partner. The three stars were unveiled at a press event at Oslo's Restaurant Schrøder, a prominent location in the Harry Hole novels. In August 2024, Peter Stormare, Anders Baasmo Christiansen, Ellen Helinder, Simon J. Berger, Ingrid Bolsø Berdal and Kelly Gale were amongst a number of casting additions which also included Kåre Conradi, Fridtjov Såheim and Eili Harboe.

== Release ==
The series was released on Netflix on 26 March 2026.

== Reception ==
Metacritic review
breakdown (unweighted)

Positive
5 (50%)
Mixed
5 (50%)
Negative
0 (0%)

On the review aggregator website Rotten Tomatoes, the first season holds a 91% approval rating based on 22 critic reviews. The website's critical consensus states, "Twisty, stylish, and at times gloriously grim, Jo Nesbo's Detective Hole packs enough thrills and unexpected twists to keep you hooked." Metacritic, which uses a weighted average, assigned a score of 67 out of 100 based on 10 critics, indicating "generally favorable reviews".
