= Deathtrap (plot device) =

Literary and dramatic plot device

A deathtrap is a literary and dramatic plot device in which a villain who has captured the hero or another sympathetic character attempts to use an elaborate, improbable, and usually sadistic method of murdering them.

It is often used as a means to create dramatic tension in the story and to have the villain reveal important information to the hero, confident that the hero will shortly not be able to use it. It may also be a means to show the hero's resourcefulness in escaping, or the writer's ingenuity at devising a last-minute rescue or deus ex machina.

== History ==
This plot device is generally believed to have been popularized by movie serials and 19th-century theatrical melodramas. A well-known example is the cliché of the moustache-twirling villain leaving the heroine tied to railroad tracks. Its use in the James Bond film series and superhero stories is well known.

== Examples ==
- The Engineer's Thumb (Sherlock Holmes story): Engineer Victor Hatherley is trapped inside a hydraulic press which would crush him to a pulp
  - Escape method: a woman working for the villains but not sharing their criminal ruthlessness opens a side panel at the last moment, allowing Hatherley to escape.
- Raiders of the Lost Ark: Sealing Indiana Jones and Marion in the Well of Souls
  - Escape method: Seeing a possible tunnel entrance, Jones climbs a statue and topples it towards the wall to create an entrance to a passageway that leads to the outside.
- Live and Let Die: Doctor Kananga and a minion tie James Bond and Solitaire to a platform to be lowered into a shark-infested pool to be eaten alive.
  - Escape method: Without the villains seeing, Bond activates his watch's rotary saw function to cut through his restraints to free himself and attack Kananga.
- Goldfinger: James Bond is shackled spreadeagled to a table and a circular saw (a laser in the film) is approaching to cut him in half. Unlike many deathtrap scenarios, Bond remains under constant supervision, and he does not have a device or outside help to escape.
  - Escape method: In the original novel, Bond loses consciousness, thwarting Goldfinger's plan to make him suffer, leading to the villain cancelling the imminent demise. In the film, Bond bluffs Goldfinger, and persuades him that his replacement "008" also knows about Goldfinger's plans and that Bond's death will immediately summon him to investigate, so Goldfinger elects to not take the chance of another spy coming on the scene to interfere, which he can avoid by holding Bond captive.
- Edgar Allan Poe's "The Pit and the Pendulum": The unnamed character finds himself bound to a large slab, beneath a bladed pendulum that slowly lowers toward him as it swings, with the intention of slicing through his chest.
  - Escape method: The character lures rats to the ropes with a piece of meat. They chew through the ropes, allowing him to escape before the pendulum can slice him open.
- In the Dudley Do-Right cartoon, villain Snidely Whiplash (a parody of the stereotypical "movie-serial" villain) tied up Nell Fenwick on a table-saw conveyor belt. The narrator (Paul Frees) noted that, "Fortunately, the belt was in need of oiling, so the trip was a slow one." In elapsed time, through the course of the story, this actually took several hours.
- The 1960s live action television series Batman usually had two-part episodes use a bizarre deathtrap as a cliffhanger.
  - Example: The Joker traps Batman and Robin without the use of their utility belts in the bottom of an industrial smokestack and begins to gradually fill it with a deadly heavier-than-air gas.
    - Escape method: The pair lock elbows and brace their backs against each other to walk up the smokestack to the top opening and slide down a support cable safely to the ground.
- Final Destination: The plot of the series revolves around several people surviving a catastrophe because one of them had a premonition of it. In doing this the survivors have cheated Death, a malevolent and unseen force that sets up deathtraps to kill off the survivors in the order in which they had originally died.
- The Venture Brothers: Doctor Venture in Escape to the House of Mummies Part 2. He described the trap he was in as "Slower than haunted house spiked walls, but not quite as slow as evil scientist spiked walls."
  - Escape Method: Magic forcing the walls to stop. A secondary, previously unknown Boiling Oil trap failed when a henchman confused it for "Hot Voile", which was being warmed in a clothes dryer.
- The Perils of Penelope Pitstop always involved improbable deathtraps, usually set by the Hooded Claw.
- Disney's The Great Mouse Detective: Ratigan ties up Basil and Dawson in an intricate mousetrap and tells them about his plot to kill the queen. He then leaves to see his scheme unfold, assuming that they will soon be dead.
  - Escape method: Basil activates the mousetrap he and Dawson are trapped in early, catching the ball that was meant to crush them, and setting off a chain reaction that interferes with every other aspect of the trap.
- Saw: The plot of the series revolves around the Jigsaw Killer, a terminally ill vigilante who kidnaps his victims and places them in complex traps, both to test their resolve and force them to appreciate the value of life.
- The Snowman: Rakel, Harry Hole's beloved, is forced to sit on a fast-melting snowman; when it had melted she would fall down and the razor-sharp wire around her neck would decapitate her.
  - Escape Method: Harry arrives on the scene and extricates Rakel in nick of time, at the acceptable price of the wire cutting off one of his fingers.
- You're Next: One of the methods used by the killers includes the use of a garotte-based death trap. The heroine also sets up a death trap to defend herself from the killers but it accidentally kills a police officer that arrives to save her in the finale.

A simpler variation on the deathtrap is the villain speech, also known as monologuing. The villain, after having captured the hero or another victim, gives a long speech taunting and sneering at his victim, pontificating on how said victim will soon die, and reminiscing over how he tried for so long to get his kill and is now about to reap the reward. Villains may also give away details of their evil plots, on the rationale that the victim will die immediately and the villain often believes their victim deserves to know. This speech, given when the villain could have just killed the victim in a matter of seconds, is invariably used to give another character time to come in and save the victim, or for the victim to escape. In The Incredibles (which used the term "monologuing"), Mr. Incredible and Frozone attacked villains in the middle of their speeches (Mr. Incredible is seen attacking Syndrome and Frozone is mentioned to have attacked Baron von Ruthless off-camera). In a literary sense, the villain speech is also used as a form of exposition.

Even in relatively realistic stories, villains will often take a moment to say something pithy before finishing off the victim. The antagonist would often leave the victim to die whilst they commit their evil scheme. This is echoed in the film 2001: A Space Odyssey when HAL 9000, confident that Dave will soon perish outside the ship, tells him that he is about to take control of the expedition and then sees Dave off with the flat remark: "This conversation can serve no purpose anymore - goodbye!". Dave manages to make his way inside and kill Hal.

== Spoofs ==
The concept of the deathtrap/monologue is featured in many satires.

- Deathtraps were heavily spoofed in the Austin Powers series, including a replication of James Bond's Shark Infested Water deathtrap. It is first introduced as "an easily escapeable situation involving an overly elaborate and exotic death" with Austin placed on a platform over a pool (which Dr. Evil calls "the unnecessarily slow-moving dipping mechanism"). The trap is escaped by swinging on a grapple of dental floss. As the intended sharks with laserbeams were unavailable due to the complexities of international law regarding endangered species (much to Evil's disappointment), ill-tempered mutant seabass are used instead. As part of the spoof, Scott Evil, Evil's son, insists that the deathtrap is pointless and that they could simply shoot them with a pistol, which is nearby, and yells at his father for the further incompetence of leaving them alone. Evil responds that not watching the killing but assuming it went well makes perfect sense.
- In the sitcom Blackadder, Prince Edmund is captured by his nemesis, the Hawk, who straps him into a chair which, in sixty seconds, will mutilate him in a variety of ways. Edmund's friends, Baldrick and Percy, manage to poison the Hawk and his followers, but while celebrating this unlikely victory, the time runs out, and Edmund suffers terribly by the chair's mechanisms, although not fatally (he dies when he drinks the same poisoned wine that killed the Hawk, and later, the royal family). In another episode, Lord Flashheart is confronted by a villain who begins an evil villain speech. However, rather than waiting for him to finish, Flashheart merely shoots him without warning.
- Curse of Monkey Island makes fun of this cliché. The villain LeChuck, after capturing Guybrush Threepwood, insists on telling him his plans before executing him. By this dialogue, interesting background story that connect the games together are given to the player. Guybrush does him the favour to listen, but after a while he is so bored that he refuses to listen any more, even if LeChuck pleads to continue.
- In Watchmen, the character Ozymandias takes his time and explains in detail how he will set his plan irrevocably in motion and then, in a deliberate skewering of the monologuing tendencies of supervillains, explains that "Dan, I'm not a Republic serial villain. I did it thirty-five minutes ago."
- In The Simpsons episode "You Only Move Twice", which generally spoofs Bond villain clichés, supervillain/great boss Hank Scorpio has "Mr. Bont" strapped to a table with a laser à la Goldfinger. Bont manages to escape, only to be tackled by Homer. Scorpio's henchmen promptly shoot Bont.
- Some incarnations of the Evil Overlord List point out the impracticality of deathtraps. Some examples include making sure the deathtrap has a very small estimated time of death or such lines as "Shooting is NOT too good for my enemies."
- The Flintstones episode "Dr. Sinister" spoofed the James Bond series ("James Bondrock") and featured, among other deathtraps, Fred and Barney being tied to a slab with a slowly descending pendulum with blade, a la "The Pit and the Pendulum". The duo escape when Barney holds his tied hands up and the blade slices through his bonds. He then unties himself and frees Fred before the final swing slices the slab in half.
- Ellis Rosen, cartoonist for the New Yorker, has drawn a series of cartoons about an evil squirrel who places "Mr. Ruffles", an anthropomorphic dog spy, in increasingly complex death traps.
