= The Snowman (2017 film) =

Psychological thriller film

- Theatrical release poster
- Directed by: Tomas Alfredson
- Screenplay by: Peter Straughan; Hossein Amini; Søren Sveistrup
- Based on: The Snowman by Jo Nesbø
- Produced by: Tim Bevan; Eric Fellner; Piodor Gustafsson; Robyn Slovo
- Starring: Michael Fassbender; Rebecca Ferguson; Charlotte Gainsbourg; Val Kilmer; J. K. Simmons
- Cinematography: Dion Beebe
- Edited by: Thelma Schoonmaker; Claire Simpson
- Music by: Marco Beltrami
- Production companies: Universal Pictures; Perfect World Pictures; Working Title Films
- Distributed by: Universal Pictures
- Release dates: 7 October 2017 (Haifa); 14 October 2017 (United Kingdom and Sweden); 20 October 2017 (United States)
- Running time: 119 minutes
- Countries: United Kingdom; United States; Sweden
- Language: English
- Budget: $35 million
- Box office: $43.1 million

The Snowman is a 2017 psychological thriller film directed by Tomas Alfredson and written by Peter Straughan, Hossein Amini, and Søren Sveistrup. The story is based on the 2007 novel of the same name by Jo Nesbø. The film stars Michael Fassbender, Rebecca Ferguson, Charlotte Gainsbourg, Val Kilmer, and J. K. Simmons, and follows inspector Harry Hole as he tracks a serial killer who builds snowmen at his crime scenes. Principal photography began on 18 January 2016 in Norway, before moving to London and Sweden.

The Snowman premiered on 7 October 2017 at the Haifa International Film Festival, and was theatrically released on 14 October 2017 in the United Kingdom and Sweden, and on 20 October 2017 in the United States by Universal Pictures. The film underperformed at the box office, grossing $43.1 million worldwide against a $35 million budget, and was widely panned by critics, who called it "clichéd and uninvolving." Alfredson later disowned the film and attributed many of its problems to the rushed production schedule.

== Plot ==
At a remote cabin, a boy and his mother, Sarah, are visited by his abusive biological father, a police officer named Jonas. Jonas strikes and sexually assaults Sarah, who threatens to tell Jonas's wife about their illegitimate son. Jonas leaves and Sarah follows in her car with her son. During the chase, she drifts into a catatonic state, letting go of the steering wheel. The boy escapes as the car crashes into a lake. Despite his pleading, his mother remains seated and sinks.

Years later, Harry Hole is an inspector with the Norwegian Police Service's Oslo district. He struggles with alcoholism and a recent break-up with Rakel, mother of a boy named Oleg whom Harry loves like a son. After receiving a mysterious letter signed with a childlike drawing of a snowman, Harry meets new recruit Katrine Bratt and accompanies her investigation into the disappearance of Birte Becker, a woman with a husband and daughter. The two find a snowman at Becker's home.

Harry realizes Katrine has taken police files without permission. He learns she's looking for a link between several missing persons cases and another case, from nine years before, that was investigated by an alcoholic inspector named Gert Rafto. Katrine convinces Harry to join a new investigation into the disappearance of Sylvia Otterson, whom they find alive and well at her farm. Shortly after they leave, a masked figure beheads Sylvia with an electrified cable harness. A call comes in requesting Harry specifically so he and Katrine return to the farmhouse. There they meet Sylvia's identical twin, Ane. Sylvia's body is inside her barn and her head atop a snowman.

Katrine believes corrupt businessman Arve Støp is responsible for the deaths. Traveling to Bergen to investigate further, Harry runs into Rakel's new boyfriend Mathias, a cosmetic surgeon, and realizes he forgot he had promised to take Oleg on a camping trip the same day. In Bergen, Harry finds that Inspector Rafto died by an apparent self-inflicted gunshot wound to the head. Harry then discovers Katrine is Rafto's daughter.

It's discovered that the recent victims each visited the clinic of Dr. Vetlesen, who also oversees Støp's high-class prostitution ring. When Becker's phone is reactivated, the signal is traced to Vetlesen's house. Katrine goes to arrest Vetlesen herself but finds him dead of a gunshot wound to the head, along with the remains of Birte Becker and another missing person, Hegen Dahl. The police rule Vetlesen's death a suicide and suspend Katrine for breaking protocol.

Katrine, hoping to trick Støp into confessing to killing her father, flirts with him at a public event. He invites her to his hotel room where she sets up a hidden camera but to no avail; she is attacked and drugged by a masked figure who severs a finger on her right hand. The attacker uses the finger to unlock her work tablet and wipe all its data. The next morning, Harry finds Katrine dead inside a car decorated by the outline of a snowman on its roof.

Rakel visits Harry, admitting she is conflicted and misses him. They start kissing passionately but are interrupted by a phone call from Mathias. Following a lead left behind by Katrine, Harry reinterviews Birte Becker's husband Filip and finds out he met with a hormone specialist and visiting consultant who ends up being Mathias. Meanwhile, Mathias kidnaps Rakel and Oleg, taking them to a cottage in Telemark. Harry locates the cottage and finds Mathias holding the mother and child hostage. Mathias is revealed to be the boy from the first scene, hating his mother for abandoning him and eventually targeting mothers whom he judges are harming their children. Harry frees Rakel from a cable harness but loses a finger. Mathias escapes and Harry chases him onto a frozen lake. Mathias shoots Harry then walks towards him. The ice beneath him breaks apart and he falls into the water, dragged beneath the ice by the current.

The final scene shows Harry, having had his missing finger replaced by a metal prosthesis, volunteering for a new homicide case.

== Cast ==
- Michael Fassbender as Detective Harry Hole
- Rebecca Ferguson as Katrine Bratt
- Charlotte Gainsbourg as Rakel Fauke
- Val Kilmer as Gert Rafto
- J. K. Simmons as Arve Støp
- Toby Jones as Investigator Svenson
- Adrian Dunbar as Frederick Aasen
- David Dencik as Idar Vetlesen
- Ronan Vibert as DCI Gunnar Hagen. This was Vibert's final role prior to his 2022 death.
- Chloë Sevigny as Sylvia Ottersen/Ane Pedersen
- James D'Arcy as Filip Becker
- Genevieve O'Reilly as Birte Becker
- Peter Dalle as Jonas Lund-Helgesen
- Jamie Clayton as Edda
- Jakob Oftebro as Magnus Skarre
- Jonas Karlsson as Mathias Lund-Helgesen
- Sofia Helin as Sarah Kvensland
- Dinita Gohil as Linda

Jo Nesbø, who wrote the novel on which the film is based, was supposed to have a small cameo, but his scenes were cut.

== Production ==
=== Pre-production ===
According to Variety, the initial hope with the film was to create a series in the vein of the Alex Cross film adaptations. Screen Rant has suggested that the film was inspired by the success of The Girl with the Dragon Tattoo (2011).

For a while, Martin Scorsese was attached to direct, but he dropped out in 2013. Tomas Alfredson was hired to direct the following year. Prior to Alfredson, the studio had considered Morten Tyldum and Baltasar Kormákur, although they declined. By September 2015, Michael Fassbender was in talks to star in the film, and Rebecca Ferguson and Charlotte Gainsbourg were in talks to join the cast by that October and December, respectively.

=== Filming ===
Principal photography on the film commenced on 18 January 2016 in Oslo, Norway. Fassbender was spotted on set on 21 January, in the Barcode area of Oslo, shooting a scene on the tram. A large scene depicting a party, which required over 300 extras, was shot in Oslo City Hall on 5 February. Production moved to Rjukan on 9 February, and to Bergen on 23 February. Filming in Bergen including scenes on the mountain of Ulriken, Bryggen and the Skansen firestation. Production moved back to Oslo for the remainder of filming, in mid-March. This included scenes at Restaurant Schrøder, where Harry Hole is a regular in the novel series. Filming also took place in Drammen, and on the Atlantic Ocean Road, and ended on 1 April 2016.

Reshoots and additional filming took place in Norway during the spring of 2017.

=== Production problems ===
In response to the negative critical reviews, Alfredson blamed the heavily condensed pre-production and rushed filming schedule, in which 10–15% of the screenplay remained unfilmed. This led to narrative problems when editing commenced:

Our shoot time in Norway was way too short, we didn't get the whole story with us and when we started cutting we discovered that a lot was missing. It's like when you're making a big jigsaw puzzle and a few pieces are missing so you don't see the whole picture.

Alfredson also stated that he had a lack of time to prepare the film properly:

It happened very abruptly, suddenly we got notice that we had the money and could start the shoot in London.

Actor Val Kilmer suffered from an enlarged tongue during filming due to recent treatment for throat cancer. As such, many of his scenes were filmed without the actor visibly speaking so as to allow easier dubbing during post-production. To that end, all of Kilmer's dialogue is dubbed.

== Marketing ==
Universal Pictures released a poster on 18 July 2017, and the first trailer for the film premiered the following day. An international trailer was released on 5 September. The poster, featuring a child-like drawn doodle of a snowman and a note to the police, became a popular Internet meme shortly after its release.

== Release ==
The Snowman premiered at the Haifa International Film Festival on 7 October 2017. It was theatrically released on 13 October 2017 in the United Kingdom and 20 October 2017 in the United States.

=== Home media ===
The Snowman was released on Digital on 2 January 2018, and on Blu-ray and DVD on 16 January 2018, by Universal Pictures Home Entertainment.

== Reception ==
=== Box office ===
The Snowman grossed $6.7 million in the United States and Canada, and $36.4 million in other territories, for a worldwide total of $43.1 million, against a production budget of $35 million.

In the United States and Canada, The Snowman was released alongside Boo 2! A Madea Halloween, Geostorm, and Only the Brave, and was expected to gross around $10 million from 1,813 theaters in its opening weekend. After making $1.3 million on its first day (including $270,000 from Thursday night previews), weekend predictions were lowered to $4 million. The film went on to debut to $3.2 million, finishing 8th at the box office. In its second weekend, the film dropped 64% to $1.2 million, falling to 17th place at the box office. The film was then pulled from 1,291 theaters in its third week, and fell 86% to $167,685, finishing 33rd.

=== Critical response ===
The Snowman was panned by critics, who derided what they saw as the film's scattered and incomprehensible story, as well as a lack of direction for its main cast members. On review aggregator Rotten Tomatoes, the film has an approval rating of 7%, based on 197 reviews, with an average rating of 3.2/10. The website's critical consensus reads, "A mystery that feels as mashed together and perishable as its title, The Snowman squanders its bestselling source material as well as a top-notch ensemble cast." On Metacritic the film has a weighted average score of 23 out of 100, based on 40 critics, indicating "generally unfavorable reviews". Audiences polled by CinemaScore gave the film an average grade of "D" on an A+ to F scale.

Justin Chang of the Los Angeles Times gave the film a negative review, writing "There's probably a good movie or several buried in the frigid wilds of Nesbø's fiction, and with more time and cultural nuance and fewer cooks in the kitchen, it might well be realized. Watching this bungled slopsicle of a movie, it's hard not to conclude that somebody let the wrong one in." Variety's Guy Lodge also called the film a disappointment, saying: "If The Snowman were merely a chilly, streamlined precis of a knottier page-turner, it could stolidly pass muster. The sad surprise here, considering how deftly Alfredson and Straughan previously navigated the far more serpentine plot machinations of a John le Carré classic [Tinker Tailor Soldier Spy], is the snowballing incoherence of proceedings." Manohla Dargis of The New York Times called the film a "leaden, clotted, exasperating mess". Alison Willmore of BuzzFeed News said that the film was "an inept misfire — the kind of entrancing train wreck that makes you long for a behind-the-scene tell-all to explain what, exactly, went so wrong."

Peter Bradshaw of The Guardian gave it 3/5 stars, calling it "a serviceable, watchable thriller, with very gruesome images, coagulating around psychopathologies of father obsession and son obsession". Geoffrey Macnab of The Independent also gave it 3/5 stars, saying that it was "a very slick slice of Scandinavian noir but one whose plot slaloms become increasingly preposterous."
