= The Devil's Star =

Book by Jo Nesbø

- First edition (Norwegian)
- Author: Jo Nesbø
- Original title: Marekors
- Translator: Don Bartlett
- Language: Norwegian, English
- Series: Harry Hole (#5)
- Genre: Crime fiction
- Publisher: Aschehoug
- Publication date: 2003
- Publication place: Norway (some scenes in Czech Republic)
- English publication date: 2010
- Media type: Print (Paperback)
- Pages: 448 (Eng. paperback trans.)
- Preceded by: Nemesis
- Followed by: The Redeemer

The Devil's Star (Norwegian: Marekors, literally "The Nightmare Cross", 2003) is a crime novel by Norwegian writer Jo Nesbø, the fifth in the Harry Hole series. An English-translated version of the book named The Devil's Star was translated by Don Bartlett.

The story moves between two parallel themes – the appearance of a new serial killer terrorizing Oslo, and Harry Hole's ongoing feud with the corrupt and utterly ruthless fellow police officer Tom Waaler, which was already a major part of the plot of the two previous books, "The Redbreast" and "Nemesis". Eventually, the two issues converge – enabling Harry to resolve both in the course of a single cataclysmic night.

== Plot introduction ==
A young woman is murdered in her Oslo flat. One finger has been severed from her left hand, and behind her eyelid is secreted a tiny diamond in the shape of a five-pointed star – a pentagram, the devil's star.

Detective Harry Hole is assigned to the case with his long-time adversary Tom Waaler and initially wants no part in it. But Hole is already on notice to quit the force and is left with little alternative but to drag himself out of his alcoholic stupor and get to work.

A wave of similar murders is on the horizon. An emerging pattern suggests that Oslo has a serial killer on its hands, and the five-pointed devil's star seems to be the key to solving the riddle.

== Synopsis ==
Pursuing his suspicions during the Nemesis investigation, Inspector Harry Hole attempts to convince the Chief Inspector that his colleague, Tom Waaler, is a criminal arms dealer known as 'The Prince' and mastermind behind the murder of Ellen Gjelsten, Harry's former collaborator and best friend. Due to a lack of evidence, Hole is refused and goes on an alcoholic binge. Hole's superior reluctantly sends termination of employment papers to the Chief Inspector, but Hole gets a short reprieve as the Chief is on holiday for three weeks and thus cannot sign them.

Meanwhile, a murder victim is discovered dead in her shower, shot in the head. Waaler is appointed to lead the investigation, but Hole and his former partner Beate Lønn are attached to his team. Hole, investigating the murder scene, discovers a small, red, five-pointed diamond under the eyelid of the victim and that a finger is missing from her left hand. Another murder is presumed when the director of a theatre production of My Fair Lady reports that his wife has gone missing. Her finger is later sent to Kripos; it has a ring on it with a small, red five-pointed diamond. A few days later a third victim is found, this time in the female toilets at a law firm, also on the floor and a five-pointed red diamond on the body. Yet again a finger has been removed.

Waaler – who has heard about Hole's suspicions – offers to include him in his illegal dealings, dangling the large financial benefits as an inducement. In return, Hole has to perform an initiation task. Hole is initially confused as to why Waaler is effectively admitting his guilt, but is reminded that, as an alcoholic, Hole's evidence would not be sufficient to convict him if he went to his superiors. He agrees to think about the offer. Meanwhile, a chance sighting of a pentagram brings Hole a flash of inspiration. The five-pointed diamonds found on the victims are in a similar shape – known as a Devil's Star – and provide a major clue as to the next possible murder locations, which are kept under surveillance: one is in a student residence hall and the other is a house on the outskirts of Oslo, owned by Olaug Sivertsen.

While investigating this house, Lønn discovers that the likely murderer is Olaug's son, Sven. She informs Hole by phone as he and Waaler are checking out the other prospective crime scene. Hole gives this information to Waaler, who immediately leaves to assist Lønn. Hole, using recently installed CCTV cameras, notices another pentagram on a student's door. Eventually, the body of the victim is found at the residence hall and is determined to actually be the first victim of the killer, murdered five days before the first discovered victim. Meanwhile, Waaler apprehends Sven, but his threats to shoot him ultimately lead Lønn to realise that he intended to murder Sven instead of arresting him, leading her to agree with Hole's suspicions.

Hole is given his task by Waaler: to kill Sven in custody using a poison capsule, as Waaler's influence is such that he can guarantee that Hole will get away with it. Waaler's argument for the murder is that he would get a lenient punishment from the Norwegian judicial system, and that death would be a worthy sentence for his crimes. Hole realizes however that Waaler's true aim to eliminate a potential witness to his role in the smuggling ring, and to this end Hole convinces Sven that he should trust him and not Waaler. Hole breaks Sven out of custody with the intention of bringing Waaler to justice. Now a hunted man, Hole's future in the police — and quite possibly his life — depend on his being able to prove Waaler's crimes.

Sven is willing to testify against Waaler, but is adamant of his innocence of the murders, and consequently his testimony is wholly dependent on Hole exonerating him. Hole is faced with the daunting task of discovering the true murderer in a single day. However, a clue is provided by a seemingly irrelevant photograph which Sven shows Hole, and this combined with a very minute but precise piece of forensic evidence points to a completely unexpected perpetrator. Leaving Sven chained up, Hole encounters his new suspect in the immediate aftermath of his committing yet another murder. Hole comes very near to being killed himself, but eventually the killer commits suicide. Just as Hole believes that he is in the clear, Waaler calls to inform him that he has kidnapped his surrogate son Oleg and demands that he trade Sven for the boy.

Hole arranges a meeting at the residence hall. Using the CCTV cameras as a bargaining chip, Hole tries to convince Waaler that his position is hopeless. More and more outrageous stories are proposed by Waaler to explain how he intends to cover up what has happened, and when it becomes clear that Waaler will kill all three witnesses in the lift of the building, Hole enacts an escape plan and manages to overpower Waaler and rescue Sven and Oleg, with Waaler ultimately being killed in the ensuing scuffle. Having exposed Waaler and solved the case, Hole's termination of employment is rescinded and he returns to the force.

== Adaptation ==
Netflix adapted The Devil's Star as a series, with Øystein Karlsen directing, and Nesbø writing the script. The series, entitled Jo Nesbø's Detective Hole stars Tobias Santelmann as Harry Hole, Joel Kinnaman as Tom Waaler and Pia Tjelta as Rakel Fauke premiered in March 2026.
