= The Thirst (novel) =

2017 novel by Jo Nesbø

- First edition (Norwegian)
- Author: Jo Nesbø
- Original title: Tørst
- Language: Norwegian, English
- Series: Harry Hole (#11)
- Genre: Crime fiction
- Publisher: Aschehoug
- Publication date: May 9, 2017
- Publication place: Norway
- Media type: Print
- Pages: 480
- ISBN: 978-1911215288
- Preceded by: Police
- Followed by: Knife

The Thirst (Norwegian: Tørst, 2017) is a crime novel by Norwegian writer Jo Nesbø, the eleventh in the Harry Hole series.

== Plot ==
In Oslo, three years after the resolution of the Matarife de Policías case, a new nightmare grips the city.

Elisse Hermannsen, a renowned lawyer specializing in victims of sexual assault, returns to her apartment after a disappointing Tinder date, where she is brutally murdered by a man who attacks her with a set of iron teeth, tearing at her flesh before drinking her blood. The savage and grotesque nature of the crime unleashes collective panic and an unprecedented media storm.

The investigation falls to a new Violent Crimes team: the inexperienced but promising officer Anders Wyller, the corrupt and ambitious Truls Bernstein, forensic technician Bjorn Holm, and Katrine Bratt, now head of the unit, while the powerful provincial chief Mikael Bellman—on the verge of becoming Minister of Justice—demands immediate results.

Cornered by political and public pressure, Bellman once again turns to Harry Hole, the former commissioner haunted by his own demons. Reluctant at first, Harry gets involved when new victims are murdered following the same macabre pattern and a waitress at Schrøder's is kidnapped. Convinced he's dealing with something darker than a simple serial killer, he forms an alternative team with Wyller, Holm, and Hallstein Smith, an eccentric professor and expert on vampirism. The clues lead to Valentin Gjertsen, an elusive predator who has remained beyond the reach of the law for years. Harry sets a risky trap using a civilian as bait. But Valentin sees through the scheme, disappears, and that same night, murders the civilian. Consumed by guilt, Harry spirals into an unprecedented drinking binge while Katrine discovers Valentin's true alias. When the team finally manages to track him down, they find only an empty crime scene.

Hours pass, and Valentin breaks into Hallstein Smith's property, apparently intending to kill him after the professor called Valentin a pervert in an interview. Hallstein shoots him in self-defense. Valentin flees into the woods but is tracked down by Harry, who had already been located and alerted to the incident, and killed him. Months later, the authorities find the body of the missing waitress and that of a man who was Valentin's silent accomplice. However, Harry senses there might be much more to it. After a moment's reflection, he realizes who has been manipulating Valentin. With the help of renowned psychologist Stale Aune, they set a trap for the suspect during the reading of Hallstein Smith's thesis on vampirism, and the suspect falls for it. The suspect takes Harry hostage, and together they flee in Bjorn's Volvo Amazon. During the journey, the suspect tells Harry how he met Valentin, the real motive behind all the murders, and that regardless of what happens to him, more vampires will appear. Harry manages to subdue the suspect and is rescued after being left adrift in a small boat.
