= The Redeemer (novel) =

Novel by Jo Nesbø

- First edition (Norwegian)
- Author: Jo Nesbø
- Original title: Frelseren
- Translator: Don Bartlett
- Language: Norwegian, English
- Series: Harry Hole (#6)
- Genre: Crime fiction
- Publisher: Aschehoug
- Publication date: 2005
- Publication place: Norway (some scenes in Croatia)
- English publication date: 2009
- Media type: Print (Paperback)
- Pages: 571 (Eng. paperback trans.)
- Preceded by: The Devil's Star
- Followed by: The Snowman

The Redeemer (Norwegian: Frelseren) is a 2005 novel by Norwegian crime-writer Jo Nesbø. It is the sixth entry in his Harry Hole series.

== Plot ==
In 1991, at a youth camp run by the Norwegian Salvation Army, the 14-year-old daughter of a senior Salvationist official is raped in a public toilet. Because of the Salvation Army's strict hierarchical setup, and because public knowledge of the rape will severely damage the organisation's reputation, she does not tell anyone about the ordeal. The name of the assailant is not given. That same year, during the breakup of Yugoslavia, a young Vukovar Croat fighter witnesses atrocities committed by the victorious Serb militias in the aftermath of the Battle of Vukovar. The fighter, who receives the nickname "Little Redeemer", later becomes a professional assassin who carries out contract killings in various European cities.

In the present day (2003), the assassin — calling himself Stankić — arrives in Oslo and kills a Salvation Army officer, Robert Karlsen, during a Christmas street concert. Stankić has a facial anomaly known as hyperelasticity, wherein his facial muscles can be manipulated voluntarily to stop people from recognizing him. As such, despite the murder happening in a public place, the Norwegian police get little useful information regarding the killer. Meanwhile, retiring Oslo police inspector Bjarne Møller gives his three main officers — Jack Halvorsen, Beate Lønn and Harry Hole — gifts. Hole's is a wristwatch which grows to annoy him due to its incessant ticking. Møller is replaced as senior police inspector by Gunnar Hagen.

Hole, Halvorsen and Lønn are assigned to Robert's murder. When a murder attempt is made on Robert's brother Jon, it is believed that the Karlsen family is being attacked. With Hole's former girlfriend, Rakel Fauke, having left him and started seeing another man, Matthias Lund-Helgesen, Hole meets — and eventually begins a relationship with — Martine, the young woman who (unbeknownst to Harry) was raped in 1991. Hole finds clues that lead him to Croatia and to Stankić's minder, who is revealed to be the assassin's mother. He makes a deal with her to save her son's life, but upon returning to Norway discovers that a man wearing Stankić's clothes has been shot and killed by a police marksman. The dead man's face is all but obliterated and identification is near-impossible.

Halvorsen, Lønn's boyfriend, is fatally wounded outside Jon's flat. Afterwards, Hole discovers that the blood of the dead man does not match that of Stankić, whose blood was found at the scene of Halvorsen's attack. Hole continues to follow Stankić, but now knows Jon placed the kill contract on himself by going to Croatia and setting up the hit under the guise of Robert. Jon switched places with his brother so that his murder could not be blamed on him. This had the additional bonus to Jon in that, had Stankić returned home before discovering that he had killed the wrong target, the hitman and his mother would believe they had killed the customer, thus rendering payment impossible and nullifying the need to complete the killing of the 'correct' brother.

Jon has been swindling 5,000,000 krone from the Salvation Army for an apartment block. On the night of an indoor Christmas concert, he stands up his girlfriend, Thea, claiming that he is visiting his ill father in Thailand. Stankić and Hole both get the information from Thea that Jon is about to flee the country. Stankić tracks down Jon to a toilet some distance from the main airport terminal. Hole catches up with the two and gets Jon to give a full confession, stating that anything said with a gun to his head is inadmissible in court. Jon tells everything, believing that he will be set free, but Hole instead tells Stankić that Jon's bag contains 5,000,000 krone and walks away. Behind him a single shot is heard as Stankić fulfils his contract by killing Jon and claiming his payment.

Part of the confession includes that it was Jon, not Stankić, who fatally wounded Halvorsen. Hole also knows that it was Jon who raped Martine, and that he has been raping young girls regularly ever since. Owing to the high valuation that an antique dealer puts on the watch given to him by Møller, Hole also realises that his former boss was involved in the same group of corrupt police officers as his former nemesis, Tom Waaler. Hole goes to Bergen to speak with Møller, but after Møller explains that he was trying to do what was best for the force, Harry elects not to arrest him.

== English translation ==
As with previous Harry Hole novels by Jo Nesbø, the book - called Frelseren in Norwegian - was translated into English by Don Bartlett.
