= The Leopard (Nesbø novel) =

2009 book by Jo Nesbø

- First edition (Norwegian)
- Author: Jo Nesbø
- Original title: Panserhjerte
- Translator: Don Bartlett
- Language: Norwegian, English
- Series: Harry Hole (#8)
- Genre: Crime fiction
- Publisher: Aschehoug (Norwegian 1st ed.); Harvill Secker (English 1st ed.)
- Publication date: 2009
- Publication place: Norway (some scenes in Australia, Democratic Republic of the Congo, Hong Kong, and Rwanda)
- English publication date: 20 January 2011
- Pages: 624 (English 1st ed.)
- ISBN: 978-1846554001
- Preceded by: The Snowman
- Followed by: Phantom

Jo Nesbø talks about The Leopard on Bookbits radio.

The Leopard is a crime novel by Norwegian novelist Jo Nesbø. Its Norwegian title is Panserhjerte, which does not directly translate to The Leopard; it rather means something along the lines of "armoured heart". Moreover, "leopard" refers to the stealthy tread of the killer in the book, while "armoured heart" is what Harry Hole himself gains by his experiences. Panserhjerte is also a Norwegian term for Constrictive pericarditis. The Leopard is the eighth novel featuring Nesbø's crime detective, Inspector Harry Hole.

== Synopsis ==
Following the traumatic Snowman case, former police inspector Harry Hole has exiled himself in Hong Kong. Kaja Solness, a new Norwegian Crime Squad officer, tracks down Hole and asks for his help investigating possible serial killings in Oslo. He is convinced to return when told that his father, Olav Hole, is dying. Upon his return, Hole finds that Crime Squad is in the middle of a power struggle with Kripos and its power-hungry head, Mikael Bellman, who seeks to put his agency in sole charge of the country's murder cases. Hole finds himself the target of Bellman's hostility, though Bellman is keen to take credit for the results of Hole's work.

Hole is reluctant to take part in the investigation until Marit Olsen, a female MP, is found murdered in a park. Contrary to Bellman's conclusions, Hole believes that this murder is connected to the other two. Hole and Solness, teaming up with his former colleagues at Crime Squad (Bjorn Holm y Beate Lønn), begin a discreet investigation without the knowledge of Kripos. While working together, Hole and Solness are drawn to each other and begin a tempestuous love affair. The two discover that all three victims stayed at the same ski lodge on the same night. Hole deduces that the murders are part of the killer's attempts to cover his tracks. Suspicion initially falls on a man known to have been at the ski lodge at the time, Elías Skog, but he is eliminated from the enquiry when he is murdered by the killer.

After Hole forces Bellman to include him on the Kripos team, he discovers that another person had been at the ski lodge the same day as the first four victims, a woman named Iska Peller. However, Peller is in Australia and refuses a request to be bait for the killer. Hole and Solness instigate a sting operation to draw out the killer, which almost costs them their lives when the killer outsmarts them. Hole comes to believe that the murderer is someone he knows, but the person he suspects is exonerated upon arrest. Hole and Solness then pursue the real killer into the Congo. There, they are kidnapped by associates of the killer. Hole manages to escape and, following clues given by one of the associates, finally confronts and kills the culprit at the lip of a live volcano.

Later, at the funeral of his father, Hole is reunited with his former lover, Rakel Fauke, and her son, Oleg. Hole visits the Snowman in custody, who is gravely ill and feels some remorse for his crimes. It is tacitly suggested that Hole helps the Snowman to commit suicide out of remorse for having failed to follow his father's request for him to perform euthanasia. Because of the fresh traumas stemming from the case, Hole is determined to return to Hong Kong for good.

== Style ==
Compared to the other novels in the series, The Leopard has a more cinematic and action-orientated style, taking place across three continents. The Leopard also contains significant amounts of violence. Nesbø has expressed regret for a couple of scenes in the book.

One of the main characters, Kaja Solness, may be a reference to The Master Builder, one of Henrik Ibsen's most well known plays. The play centres on a man named Halvard Solness, whose son is engaged to a woman named Kaja. Nesbø is likely to be familiar with the play, which is a classic of Norwegian culture (and of world theatre in general). The writer has not, however, made any statement on the possible connection between Ibsen's character and his own.

The Leopold's Apple device that is a central feature of the novel is an invention of Nesbø's that stems from a childhood memory of accepting a dare to eat a whole apple while it was still attached to the tree.

== Translation ==
As with the previous Harry Hole novels, The Leopard is translated from Norwegian into English by Don Bartlett.
