= Police (novel) =

2013 novel by Jo Nesbø

- First edition (Norwegian)
- Author: Jo Nesbø
- Original title: Politi
- Language: Norwegian, English
- Series: Harry Hole (#10)
- Genre: Crime fiction
- Publisher: Aschehoug
- Publication date: October 15, 2013
- Publication place: Norway
- Pages: 448
- ISBN: 978-0307960498
- Preceded by: Phantom
- Followed by: The Thirst

Police (Norwegian: Politi, 2013) is a crime novel by Norwegian writer Jo Nesbø. It is the tenth novel in Nesbø's Harry Hole series.

== Plot ==
The story begins with a brief introduction that gathers information about the events of the previous novel: the downfall of Dubái, a drug dealer of unknown identity who monopolized the Oslo drug market with a synthetic drug called «violin»; the resolution of the murder of Gusto Hansenn, an attractive 19-year-old salesman and Dubái's employee; the exoneration of Oleg Fauke, the prime suspect in Gusto Hansenn's murder; and the attempt on the life of Harry Hole, who appears to have fared poorly after the encounter with Gusto's killer, which took place at the very location where the crime occurred: the 92 of Hausmann Street.

Days later, deep in the Maridalen forest, a retired police officer is found dead. The investigation is assigned to Katrine Bratt, Bjørn Holm, and Beate Lønn, who provides a disturbing detail about the scene: in that very spot, more than ten years earlier, a murder had been committed that was never solved. And the new victim—ironically—had been part of the team that investigated that crime. Meanwhile, at Rikshospitalet , Inspector Anton Mittet keeps watch over an anonymous patient in a coma. Should he ever awaken, he could provide testimony that ties up several loose ends from the previous novel. Months pass, and the case of the murdered officer remains unsolved… until the unexpected happens: a second policeman is found dead on a ski slope. The modus operandi is identical, and the scene is laden with the same symbolism: there, too, years earlier, another unsolved murder was committed. And, as before, the new victim had been one of the investigators.

A recent connection between those two old murders leads Katrine Bratt to Valentin Gjeltsen, an inmate found dead in his cell months earlier. But the situation takes a turn when an informant assures her that Valentin is still alive.

Mikael Bellman, the new provincial police chief, and Isabelle Skøyen, the city councilor for social affairs, receive word that the anonymous patient is about to awaken. Fearing discovery, they order his execution.

Shortly afterward, Anton Mittet is murdered using the same modus operandi as the two previous officers. It then becomes undeniable: a serial killer is operating on the streets. Pressured by the press and his superiors, Bellman assembles a special task force, composed of Beate Lønn, Bjørn Holm, Katrine Bratt, and Ståle Aune, the renowned forensic psychologist. Together, they formulate the theory that Valentin Gjeltsen is behind the murders. But having made no significant progress, they resort to their last option: Harry Hole, who is still alive and now teaches at the Police Academy. Initially, he refuses to cooperate with the investigation, fearing he will relapse into alcoholism and destroy the fragile order of his new life. Even so, he provides a detail that could explain how the killer manages to lure victims to the crime scenes. With this clue, the group sets a trap. Night falls, but the killer doesn't appear. But the next morning, the devastating news arrives: the killer has struck again. And the victim is a friend of Harry's. And that, finally, forces him to get involved.
