= The Bat (novel) =

1997 crime novel by Jo Nesbø

- First edition (Norwegian)
- Author: Jo Nesbø
- Original title: Flaggermusmannen
- Language: Norwegian, English
- Series: Harry Hole (#1)
- Genre: Crime fiction
- Publisher: Aschehoug
- Publication date: 1997
- Publication place: Australia
- Media type: Print (Hardcover, Paperback)
- Pages: 432
- ISBN: 978-0099520320
- Followed by: Cockroaches

The Bat (Norwegian: Flaggermusmannen, "Bat Man") is a 1997 crime novel by Norwegian writer Jo Nesbø, the first in the Harry Hole series.

== Plot ==
Norwegian police officer Harry Hole is sent to Sydney, Australia to work with Australian police investigating the murder of a young Norwegian woman residing in Australia, Inger Holter. Her boyfriend, Evans White, is initially approached as a suspect. Hole is assisted by Aboriginal colleague Andrew Kensington; together they find out that they are dealing with a serial killer who strangles blonde women. As the story becomes more complex, Hole struggles to find the killer and falls deeper into alcoholism.

== Translation status ==
This is the first of the Harry Hole novels, introducing the character, but it was very late in being translated to English. The British and American publishers chose to start by translating the later books, set in Oslo, and only after these became very popular came around to publishing the first book, set in Australia.

This order of publication caused an unintended spoiler, as Harry's reminiscences in a later book—published earlier in English—included the name and specific characteristics of the murderer in The Bat.

The second book, Cockroaches, set in Thailand, has been translated to English, fifteen years after being originally published in Norwegian, and was published in the UK in November 2013.

== Critical notes ==
Kirkus Reviews states that "It’s an unusual debut since the very first page finds Harry clearing passport control in Sydney, half a world away from his native Oslo... Harry is already every bit as volcanic as in his later cases. The big difference is Australia, which Nesbø, seeing it through the eyes of both a tourist and a cultural pathologist, makes you wonder how much different it is from Norway after all."

Andy Hoban of Sunday Express gave a rating (Note: In the article, the rating is referred to as a "verdict") of 5/5 and noted "Nesbo’s principal characters are both credible and well-drawn and it is fantastic to see a younger Harry, a more loquacious Harry. The Bat explains some of what burdens and drives him in the later books. So for anyone new to Nesbo, you are in for a treat if you follow Harry’s career beginning with this book. For me, the biggest insult to Nesbo was to see him advertised as “the next Stieg Larsson” when in fact The Bat was written eight years before The Girl With The Dragon Tattoo. Still, now I can dig out the rest of the series and read them again, in order."
