= Knife (novel) =

2019 crime novel written by Jo Nesbø

- Cover of first edition (Aschehoug)
- Author: Jo Nesbø
- Original title: Kniv
- Translator: Neil Smith
- Language: Norwegian
- Series: Harry Hole (#12)
- Genre: Crime fiction
- Publisher: Aschehoug
- Publication date: 6 June 2019
- Publication place: Norway
- English publication date: 9 July 2019
- Media type: Print
- Pages: 519
- ISBN: 978-82-03-36418-1 (hardcover)
- OCLC: 1117712320
- Dewey Decimal: 839.823/8
- LC Class: PT8951.24.E83 K55 2019
- Preceded by: The Thirst
- Followed by: Killing Moon

Knife (Norwegian: Kniv, 2019) is a crime novel by Norwegian writer Jo Nesbø, the twelfth in the Harry Hole series. The book is set in Oslo.

== Plot ==
Harry Hole started drinking again and was kicked out of his home by his wife Rakel. Recently, only minor cases have been entrusted to him, despite the fact that his investigative skills are well known at the anti-crime in Oslo. Everything changes when one morning he wakes up covered in blood without remembering what happened the previous evening and, a short time later, he discovers that a murder had taken place that night.

== Reception ==
Tom Nolan of Wall Street Journal praised Knife's "memorable, well-drawn" character and called it "arguably the best entry yet" in the Harry Hole series, writing, "The moral conundrums in "Knife" are Dostoevskian, the surprises are breathtaking, the one-liners are amusing and the suspense is unrelenting."

Publishers Weekly criticized the novel for having an "enormous number of characters, backstories, subplots, and themes" but nonetheless praised its "well-orchestrated" ending.

Rob Merrill of the Associated Press praised the novel's pacing but felt part of its quality was lost in the English translation.
