= Phantom (Nesbø novel) =

2012 novel by Jo Nesbø

- First edition (Norwegian)
- Author: Jo Nesbø
- Original title: Gjenferd
- Language: Norwegian, English
- Series: Harry Hole (#9)
- Genre: Crime fiction
- Publisher: Aschehoug; Knopf
- Publication date: 2 October 2012
- Publication place: Norway
- Pages: 611
- ISBN: 978-0307960474
- Preceded by: The Leopard
- Followed by: Police

Phantom is a crime novel by Norwegian writer Jo Nesbø, published in 2012. Its Norwegian title, Gjenferd, does not directly translate to "Phantom"; rather to "revenant", a word similar to "ghosts" but specifically meaning "someone who comes back from the dead". Phantom is the ninth novel featuring crime detective Inspector Harry Hole.

== Synopsis ==
Three years after the last case was closed, inspector Harry Hole is returned from his self-imposed exile in Hong Kong when he is told that Oleg, the son of his on-off girlfriend Rakel Fauke, has been arrested for the murder of his flatmate, Gusto. Since Hole has become a father figure to Oleg, he comes to Norway to determine the truth about the murder. Meanwhile, an airline pilot is arrested for smuggling heroin, but—thanks to a mole within the Oslo police—he is released and is pressured into working more closely with the drug dealing gang. Hole meets an elderly priest who, throughout the novel, gives Harry seemingly random information that ultimately aids him in solving Gusto's murder.

Hole discovers that the drug scene in Oslo no longer revolves around heroin, but around a highly-addictive morphine-based drug called violin. He discovers that drug-pushers who deal in violin wear Arsenal football shirts and, using this clue, manages to obtain a sample. Pretending to be Oleg's lawyer, Hole manages to sneak into his cell to get his side of the story. Hole becomes convinced that the police have the wrong suspect and that Oleg has been arrested to take the heat off the real violin dealers. This theory is seemingly confirmed when Oleg is attacked in his cell moments after Hole leaves. Flashbacks reveal how Oleg, Gusto and Gusto's foster-sister Irene got involved in the violin trade, and how Irene has been kidnapped by the man who developed violin to use as a sex slave.

Hole manages to track down and free Irene, then heads to a house which he has discovered is the residence of the mysterious drug lord is residing. He kills a bodyguard before getting trapped in the cellar of the house, which is flooded with water. Using an empty whisky bottle as an air pocket, Hole is able to escape drowning. An object in the drug lord's house gives Hole a hint about his identity, and he realizes that he has unknowingly met him already. He confronts the man in a life-and-death struggle which involves a paradoxical grudging respect and mutual attraction. The encounter also enables Hole to discover who had killed Gusto, and how Gusto himself was related to the drug lord. Hole then confronts Gusto's killer, but before he can be taken in, he shoots and apparently kills Hole.

== Translation ==
As with the previous Harry Hole novels, Phantom is translated from Norwegian into English by Don Bartlett (http://donb.info/).
