= Tobias Santelmann =

Norwegian actor

- Born: Freiburg, Baden-Württemberg, West Germany
- Occupation: Actor
- Years active: 2010–present

Tobias Santelmann is a German-born Norwegian actor. He is best known for starring in the Academy Award-nominated film Kon-Tiki (2012). In 2026 Santelmann starred as Harry Hole in the Netflix series Jo Nesbø's Detective Hole.

His credits also include Hercules (2014), Point Break (2015), The Heavy Water War (2015), Grenseland (2017), The Last Kingdom (2015–2018), Atlantic Crossing (2020), Those Who Kill (2021), and Exit (2019–2023).

== Early life and education ==
Tobias Santelmann was born in Freiburg, Germany. He moved with his family to Norway when he was young. He was raised in Lindesnes Municipality in south Norway, later moving to Oslo when he was 16 years old.

He studied at the Oslo National Academy of the Arts, graduating in 2006.

== Career ==
Santelmann worked at The Norwegian Theatre in Oslo with appearances in The Castle, The Good Person of Szechwan, and Nora. His screen credits include Norwegian films like Kon-Tiki (2012), Flukt (2012), Jag Etter Vind (Chase the wind) (2013), and Jeg er din (I Am Yours) (2013). Santelmann's film work outside Norway includes supporting performances in the films Hercules (2014), and Point Break (2015), and a starring role in the BBC television series The Last Kingdom (2015–2018).

From 2019 to 2023, Santelmann played Henrik in Exit, a series in three seasons that described the decadent lives of four men in Oslo's finance elites. It became the most streamed series in the history of Norwegian national television.

In 2021, he played the role of a serial killer in the mini series Those Who Kill.

In 2020, Santelmann, though relatively unknown in the United States, was chosen to play Prince Olav in the TV series Atlantic Crossing, a joint Norway/US production, alongside Sofia Helin and Kyle MacLachlan.

In 2026 Santelmann stars as Jo Nesbo's Harry Hole in the Netflix series Jo Nesbø's Detective Hole.

== Selected filmography ==
=== Film ===
Year	Title	Role	Notes
2010	Varg Veum	Stian Brandt	
2012	Kon-Tiki	Knut Haugland	
2012	Flukt	Arvid	
2013	Jag etter vind	Håvard	Nominated – Amanda Award for Best Supporting Actor; Nominated – Amanda Award for Best Newcomer
2013	Jeg er din	Dirk	
2014	Kraftidioten	Finn	
2014	Hercules	Rhesus	
2015	Point Break	'Chowder'	
2018	Mordene i Kongo	Tjostolv Moland	
2019	Out Stealing Horses		

=== Television ===
Year	Title	Role	Notes
2010	Maria	Ole Marius Aronsen	
2011	Stikk	Georg	
2014, 2016	Frikjent	Erik Nilsen	Main (18 episodes)
2014	Øyevitne (Eyewitnesses)	Lars Strømme	Main (5 episodes)
2015	The Heavy Water War	Joachim Rønneberg	Main (6 episodes)
2015	Homeland	Colonel Haugen	Guest (1 episode)
2015–2018	The Last Kingdom	Ragnar	Main (3 seasons – 13 episodes)
2016	Marcella	Yann Hall	Series 1 (8 episodes)
2017	Grenseland	Nikolai Andreassen	Main (8 episodes)
2019, 2021	Beforeigners	"Blond Viking"; Olaf the Stout	Guest (1 episode); Main (6 episodes)
2020	Atlantic Crossing	Prince Olav	Main (8 episodes)
2021	Those Who Kill	Peter Vinge	Main (9 episodes)
2019–2023	Exit	Henrik	Main (24 episodes)
2024	Veronika	Tomas	Main (8 episodes)
2026	Jo Nesbø's Detective Hole	Harry Hole	Lead role (9 episodes)
