= Restaurant Schrøder =

Restaurant in Norway

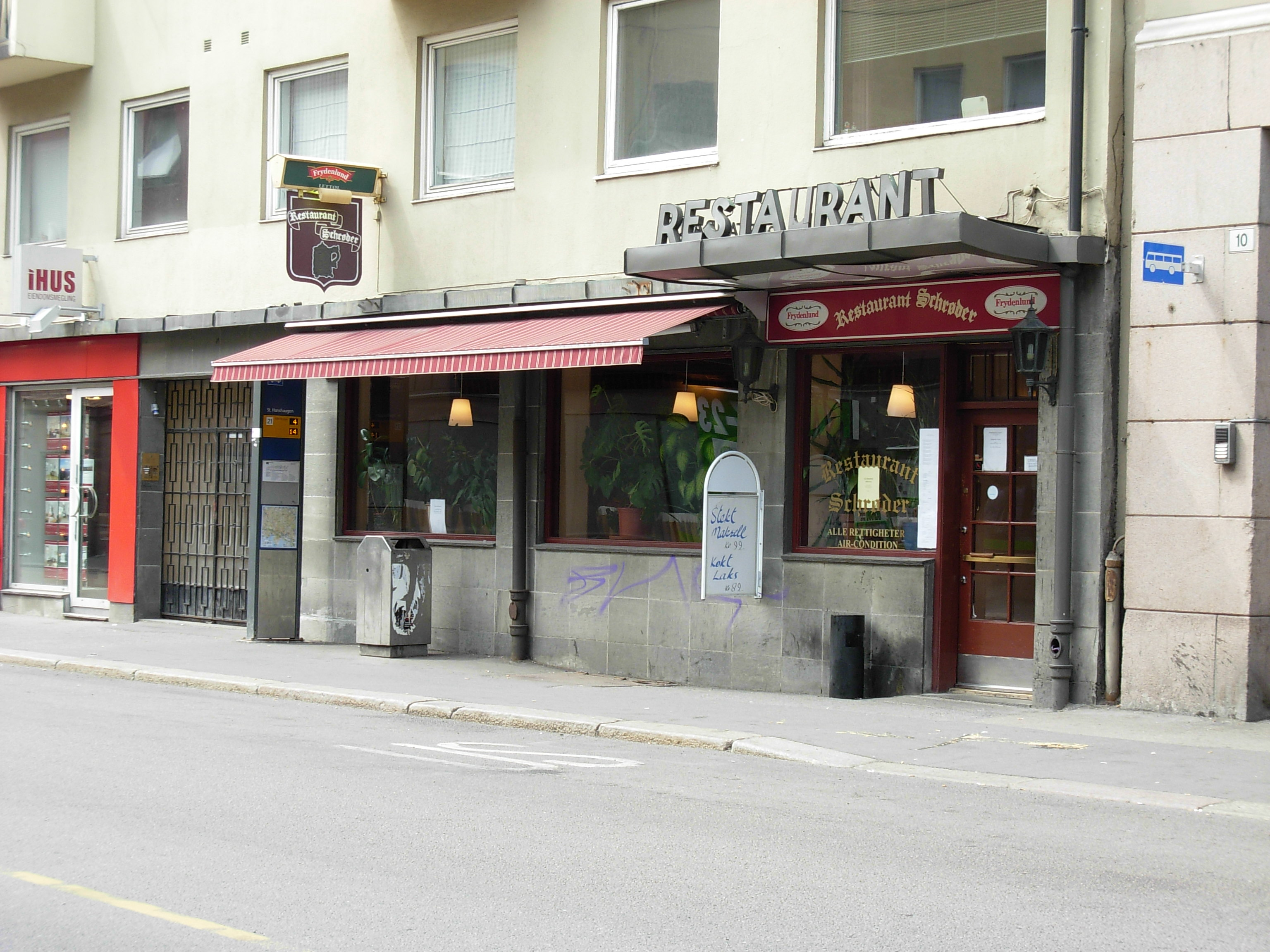
- Restaurant Schrøder
- Interactive map of Restaurant Schrøder

Restaurant information
- Food type: Norwegian cuisine European cuisine
- Location: 59°55′24.352″N 10°44′22.394″E; Waldemar Thranes gate 8, Oslo, Norway, N-0171, Norway
- Website: www.restaurant-schroder.no

Restaurant Schrøder is a restaurant in Waldemar Thranes gate 8 at St. Hanshaugen in Oslo, Norway. This restaurant appeared in several fictional works including Jo Nesbø's books about Harry Hole and several books by Bjørg Vik.

== Schrøder in Torggata 14 from 1925 to 1954 ==
In 1925, Hans Schrøder took over Elise Pettersens café which had been operating in the corner building of Torggata/Hammersborggata since 1912, one block north of Youngstorget, with a view towards Arbeidersamfunnets plass. The restaurant lay on the same corner as the Oslo Workers' Society (Norwegian: Oslo Arbeidersamfunn), and was an important link between the meetings there.

Male waiters had black pants, white jackets and a cloth draped over their arms. The female waiters had black silk aprons. Schrøder had live music, including Martin Bækkelunds accordion, and his sons Kjell and Rolf who debuted here on the piano and violin respectively. The building was torn down in 1954 in connection with the building of the new Folkets hus.

== Restaurant in Waldemar Thranes gate ==
In 1956 Schrøder moved into the new building in Waldemar Thranes gate 8, near the intersection of Waldemar Thranes gate and Ullevålsveien, which is the heart of St. Hanshaugen with shopping and restaurants. A restaurant had been run in the old building since 1900 when Frk. Glansins Restaurant was established. Hilmar Hansen ran the Terrasse-Restaurant from 1923 to 1953. The building was torn down in 1954, and Schrøder moved into the new building upon completion in 1956. The building was designed by the architect G. T. Schulz. Georg Karlson, who had been running Schrøder since 1946, continued on and lived with his family in the building. There were two pillars in the middle of the premises and a small porch by the entrance. The tables were dressed first with red tablecloths and then with a smaller white tablecloth placed diagonally on top. For the past 20 years with the current owners, the interior has remained unchanged. After July 1, 2004, when the no-smoking law came into effect in Norway, the restaurant was painted to remove the smoke odour.

Paintings from 1926 by Sigurd Fosnes hang on the walls, depicting Bergfjerdingen (the stairs up to Damstredet), Torggata with the first Torggata Bad and from the corner of the building where the restaurant was located, the wooden house district in Telthusbakken, the former wooden house district at Enerhaugen and a several meter wide picture from Youngstorget. There was live music at Schrøder in 1960s, and doorman Holm sung with the accompaniment of Sigurd Dahl on the piano and waiter Trygve Nilsen on the violin. The restaurant was well known as the place to go before and after sporting events at Bislett Stadium, such as the World Championships in speed skating.

== The Menu ==
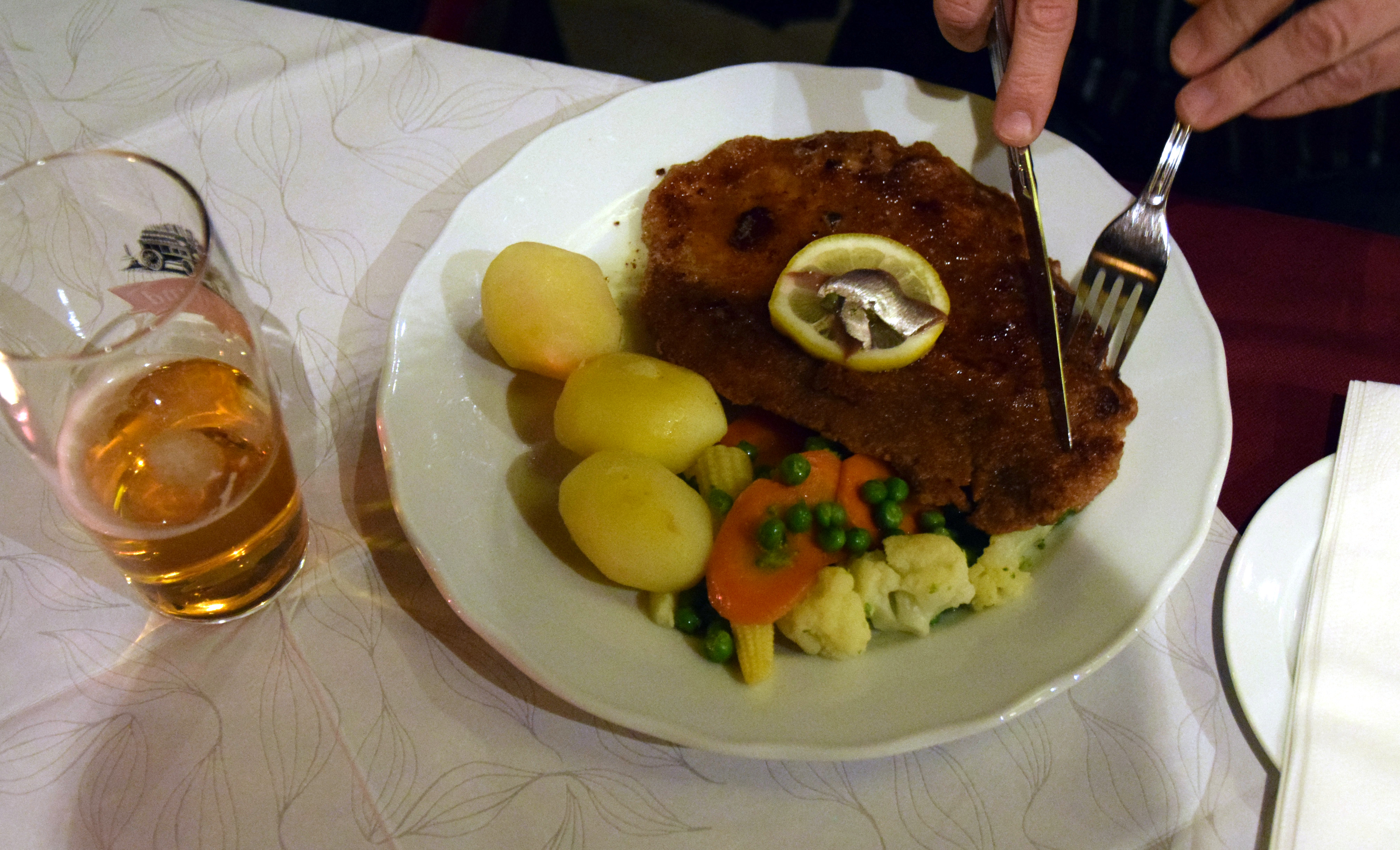
Wiener Schnitzel at Restaurant Schrøder

The restaurant serves traditional Norwegian café and restaurant style food, such as pork and sauce and Wiener Schnitzel. Entrecôte, meat patties and plaice were on the menu in 1957 and are still there in 2016. In November and December, the traditional Christmas dishes pinnekjøtt and lutefisk, are served in the evenings and Schrøder generally has full occupancy during this time.

== Harry Hole and the Award An alright guy/An alright lady ==
Schrøder is the "second home" of the fictional character Harry Hole, a police investigator in several of Jo Nesbø's novels. Hole's regular table is described as being farthest in, beside the window, where there was enough light to read the newspaper. Harry is mentioned as living in Sofies gate 5, a few hundred meters from Schrøder. Rita, a fictional sharp-tongued barmaid working at Schrøder's is a regular character in the series.

With the increasing popularity of the novels, citywalks "In Harry Hole's footsteps" were instituted, including of course visits to the restaurant. The movie based on the novel The Snowman (Norwegian: Snømannen) was filmed in January to March 2016 in Oslo, also in Schrøder.

Jo Nesbø hands out the awards for An Alright guy/An Alright Lady (Norwegian: En ålreit fyr/Ei ålreit dame) at Schrøder. The award was established in i 2008 by the Harry Hole-foundation, and the foundation together with the award recipient gives a donation of a half a million Norwegian krones to promote basic reading and writing skills in developing countries.

== Bjørg Vik and Schrøder ==
The author Bjørg Viks father worked at Schrøder, and the restaurant in Torggata is an important place in the novel Små nøkler, store rom from 1988. In Elsi Lund from 1994 the father has temporary posts in other restaurants until the restaurant in Waldemar Thranes gate opens.

== Gallery ==
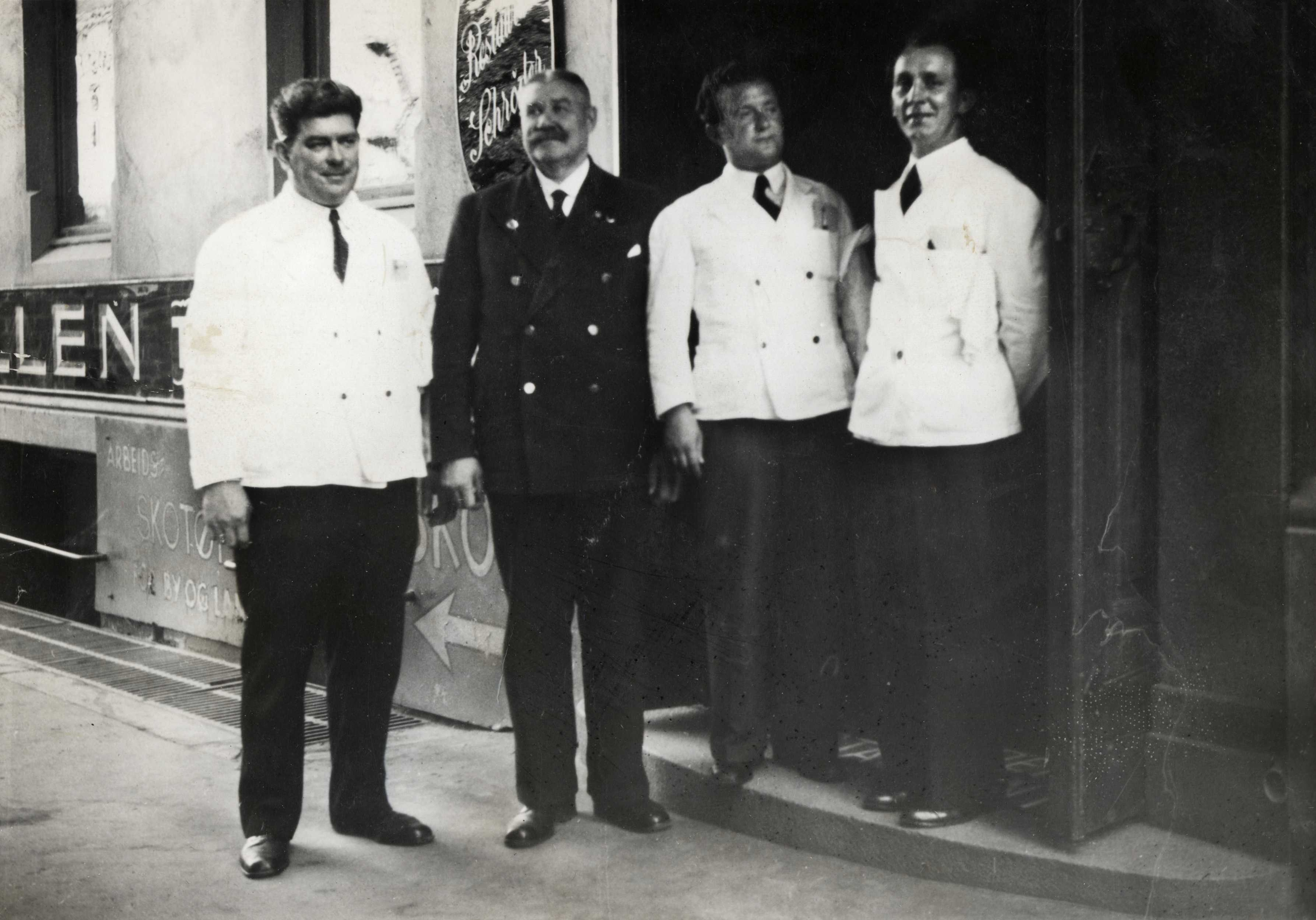
Doorman B. Stålkrantz and three waiters, ca. 1940. Photographer unknown. Photo owned by the Oslo Museum.

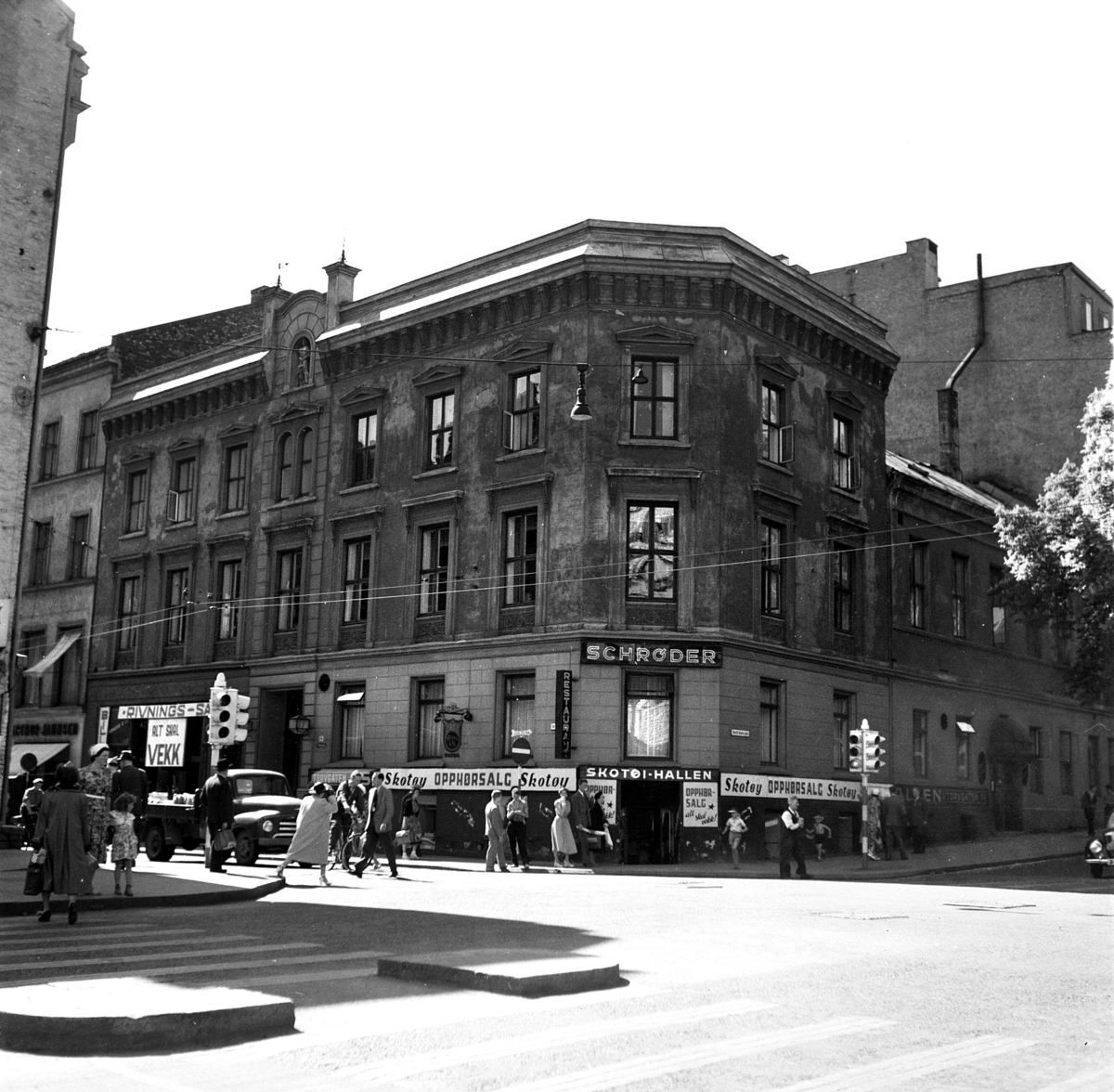
Restaurant Schrøder in Torggata June 14, 1954. Photo owned by Oslo Museum.

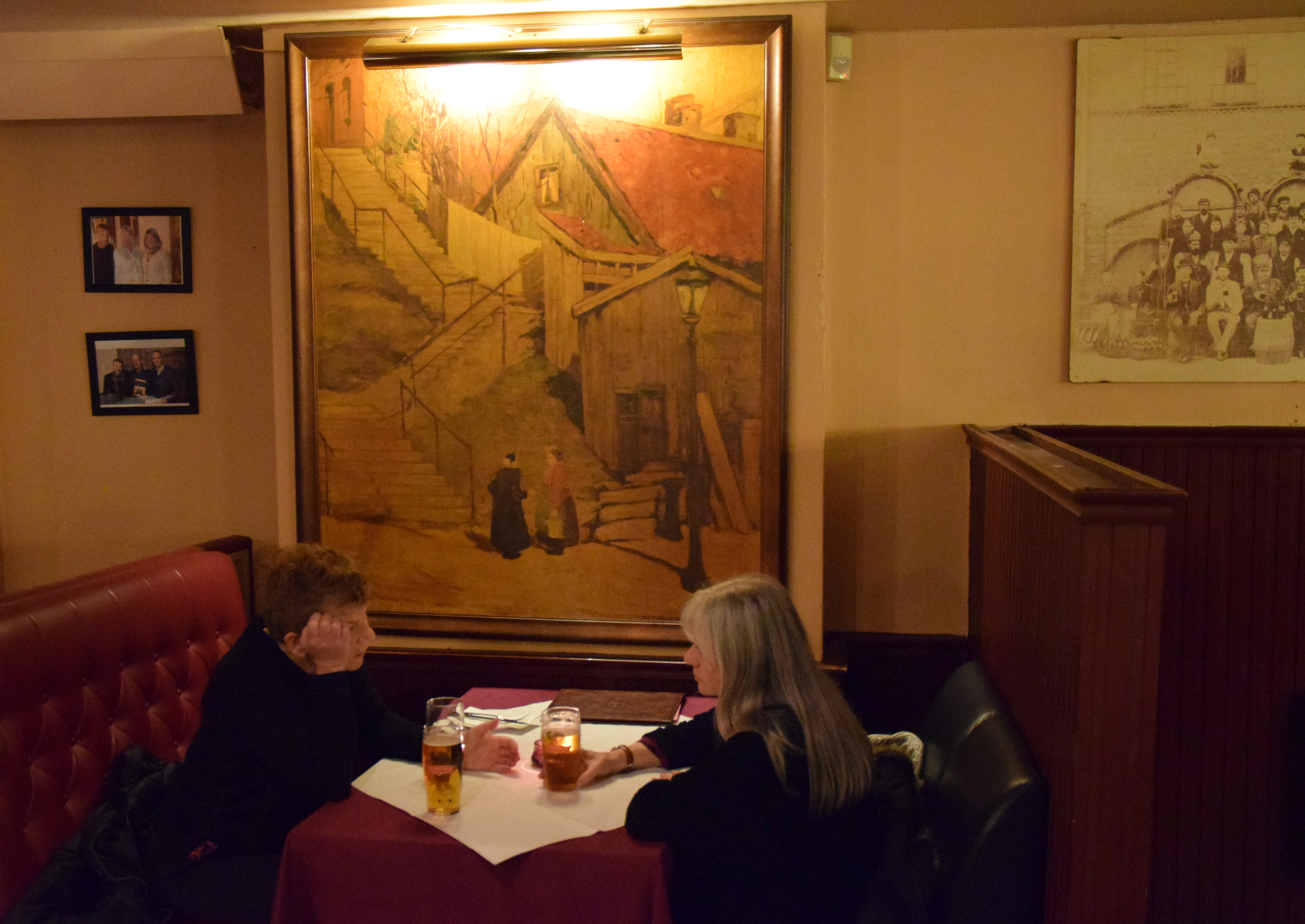
Table by the picture of the stairs from Rosteds gate to Damstredet.

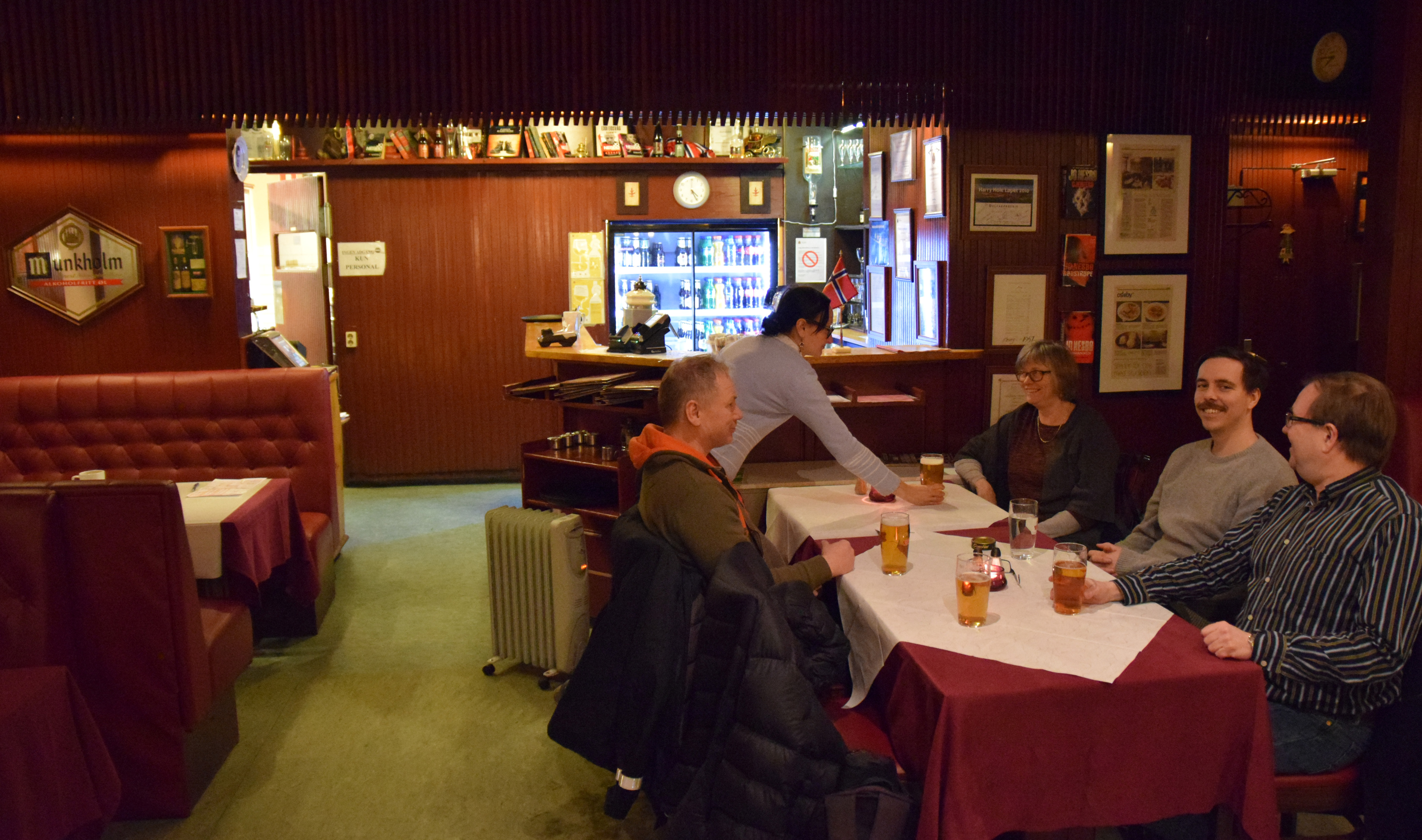
The innermost area of the restaurant.

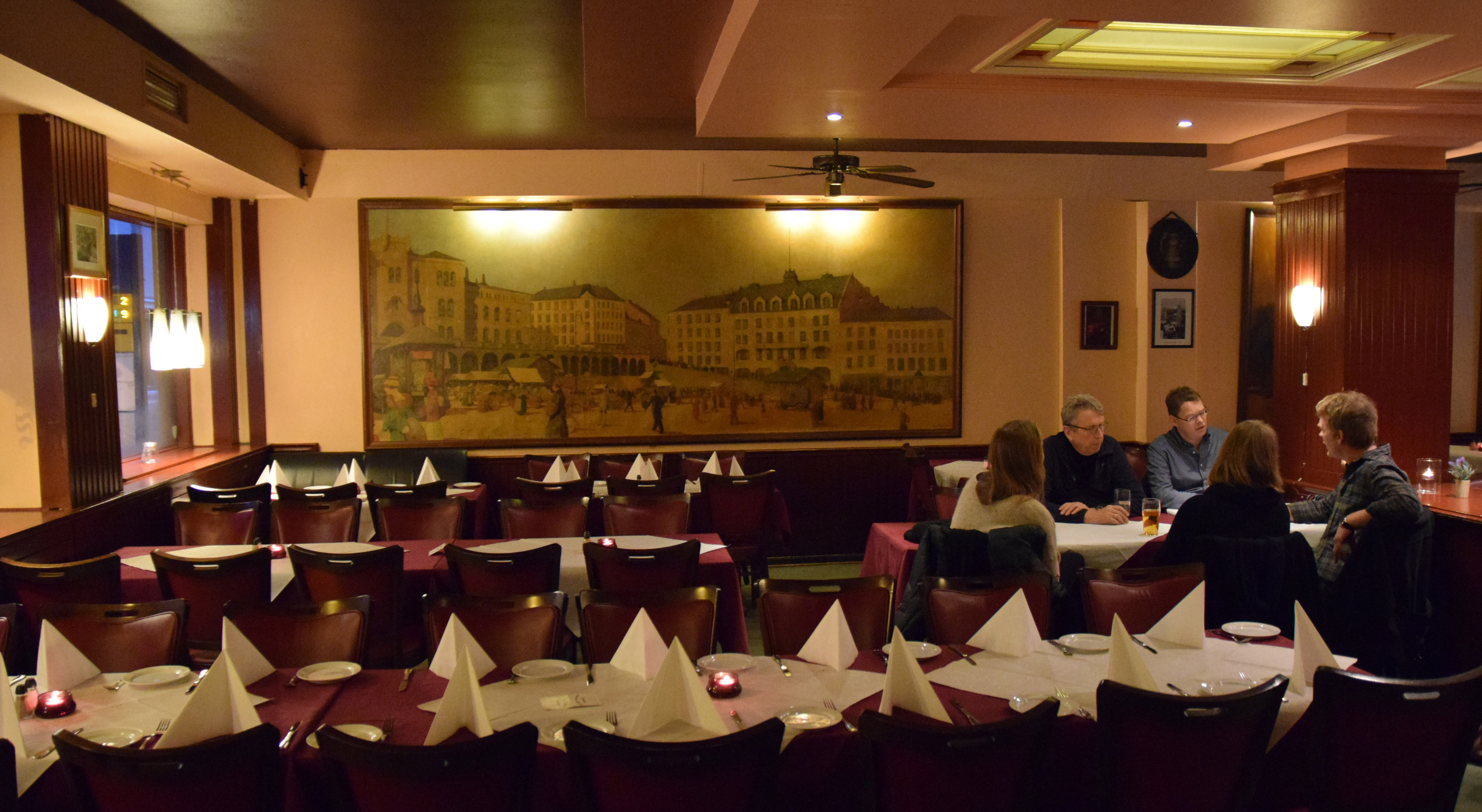
Tables towards the windows, with the picture of Youngstorget.

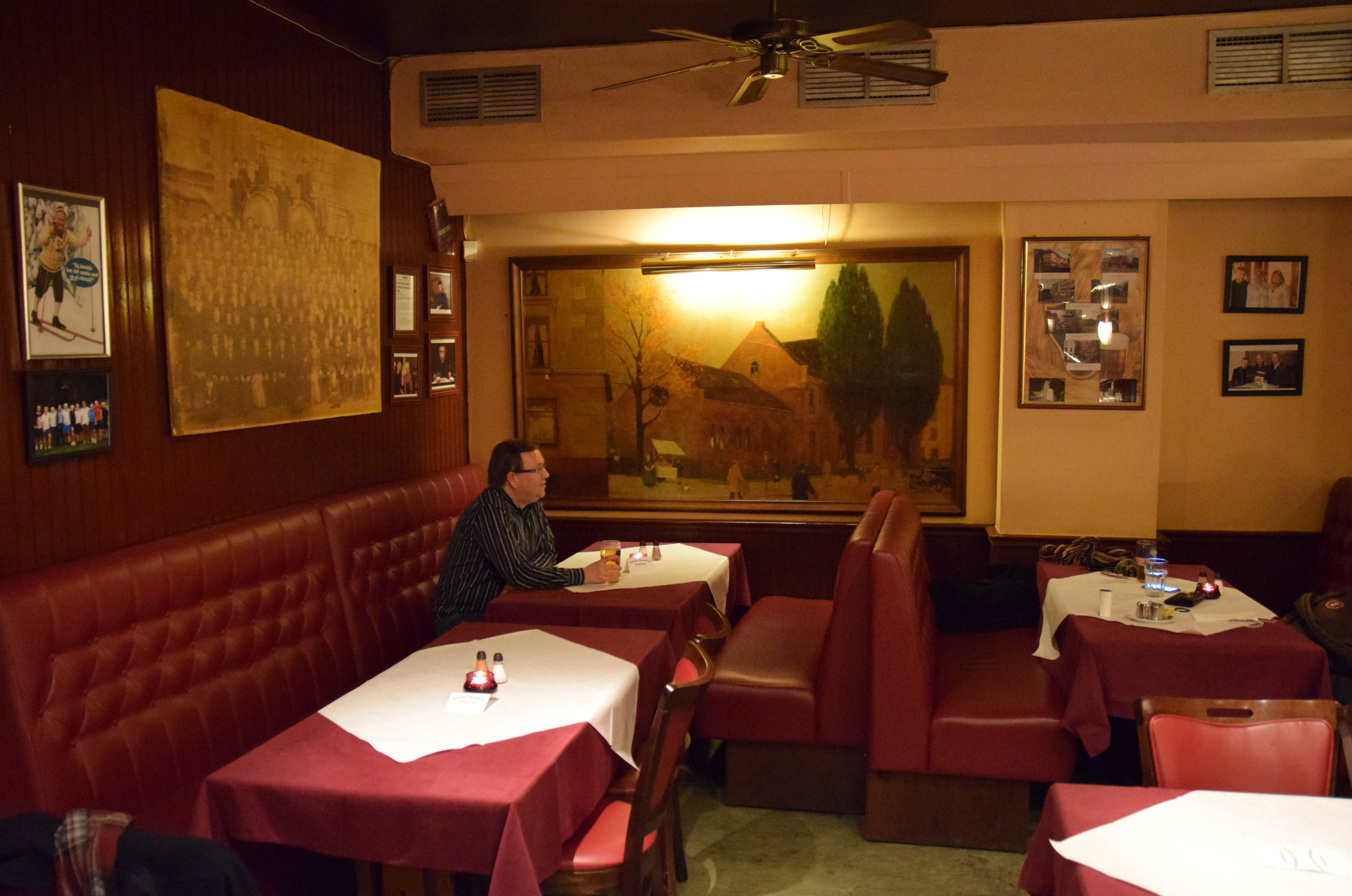
Table by the picture of the first Torggata bad.

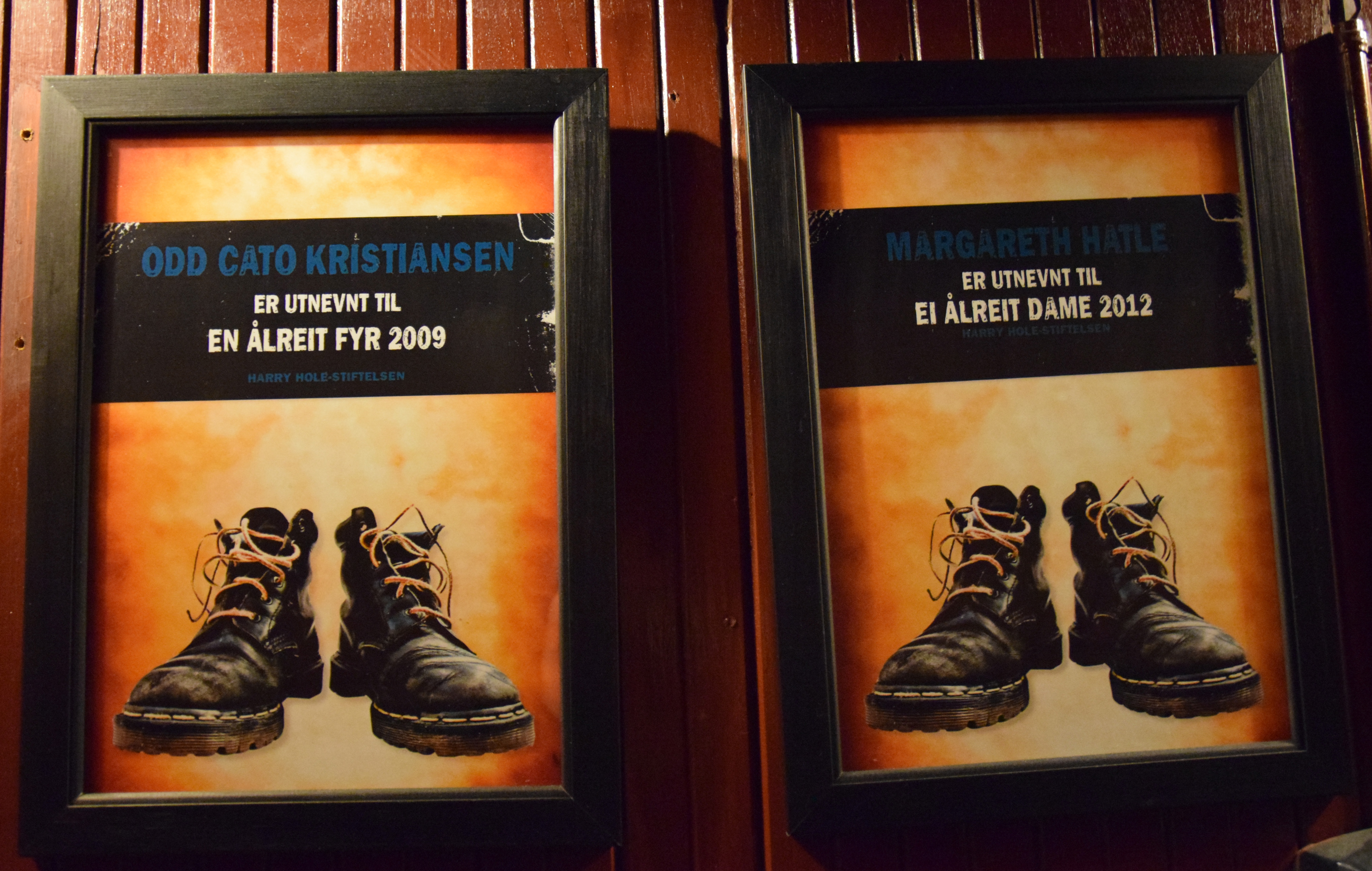
The awards An alright guy/An alright lady on the wall in the restaurant.

== Literature ==
- Per-Erling Johnsen: Brune kafeer. Oslos uforanderlige møtesteder. Oslo, Schibsted, 2005.
