= Youngstorget =

Public square in Oslo, Norway

Coordinates: 59.914943°N 10.748826°E

Youngstorget (English: Young’s Square) is a square and public space located in downtown Oslo. It lies at the junction of the streets Storgata and Møllergata and alongside Torggata. Constructed in 1846, it has become a symbol of political power in Norway.

== Etymology ==
Although colloquially called Youngstorget by the public, the square was officially named Nytorvet ("New Square") in 1852, which was its official name until 1951, when the city council voted to change the name to Youngstorget. It is named after politician and financier Jørgen Young (1784–1837) who owned most of the adjacent area. A former member of the Storting, by the time of his death, Young was the wealthiest man in the city.

== Features ==
Due to its close proximity to the Government quarter the area around the square includes the headquarters of many political organizations. Because of this it is considered to be the center of political power in Norway. Surrounding the square lies amongst others the head offices of the Norwegian Labour Party, the Workers' Youth League, the Liberal Party and the Norwegian Confederation of Trade Unions. Associated with the Labor movement, it is the site of annual May Day celebrations, as well as other mainly political demonstrations.

A painting of Youngstorget in 1926 by Sigurd Fosnes decorates a wall in Restaurant Schrøder in St. Hanshaugen.

== Gallery ==
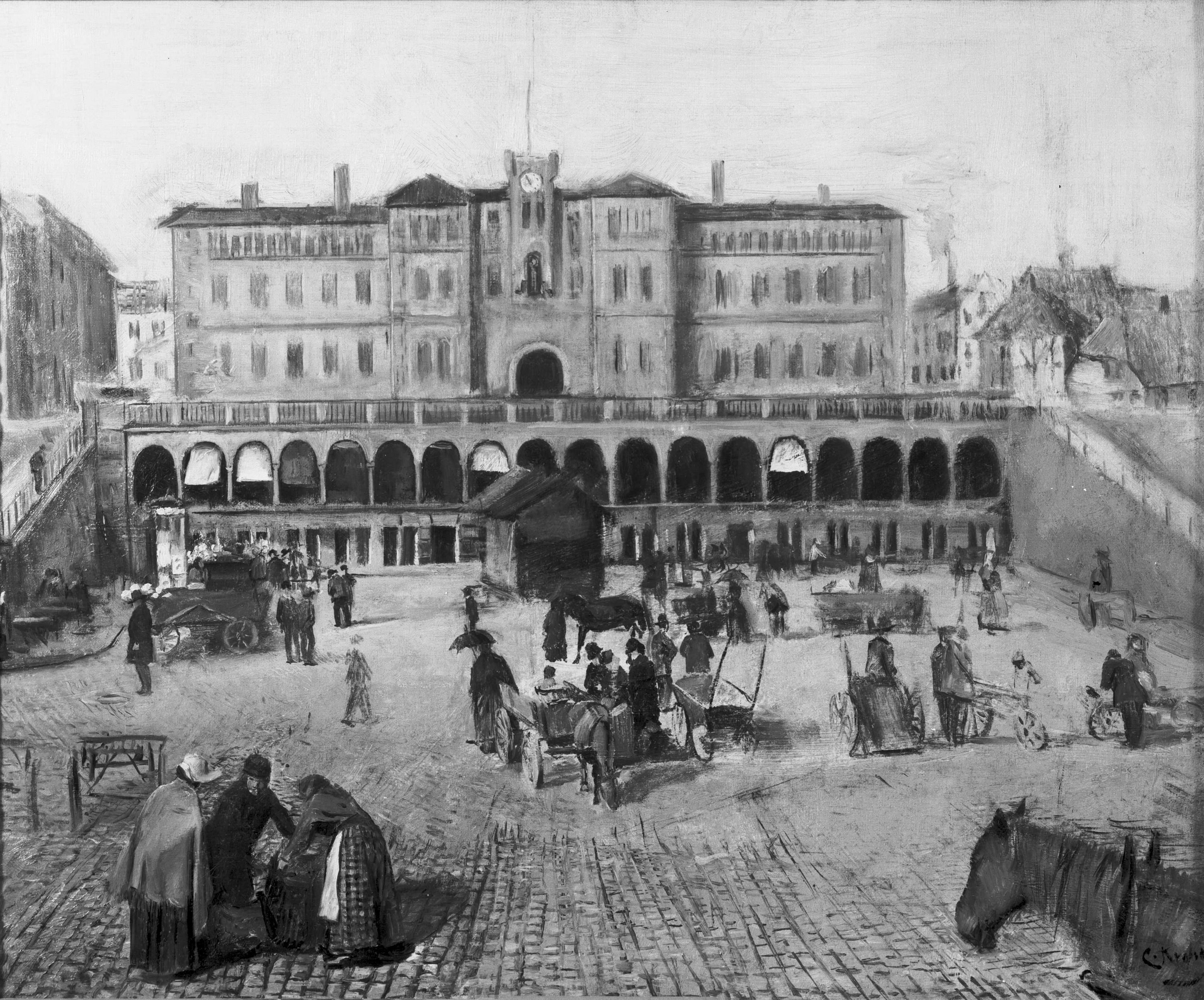
Painting of Youngstorget, circa 1900

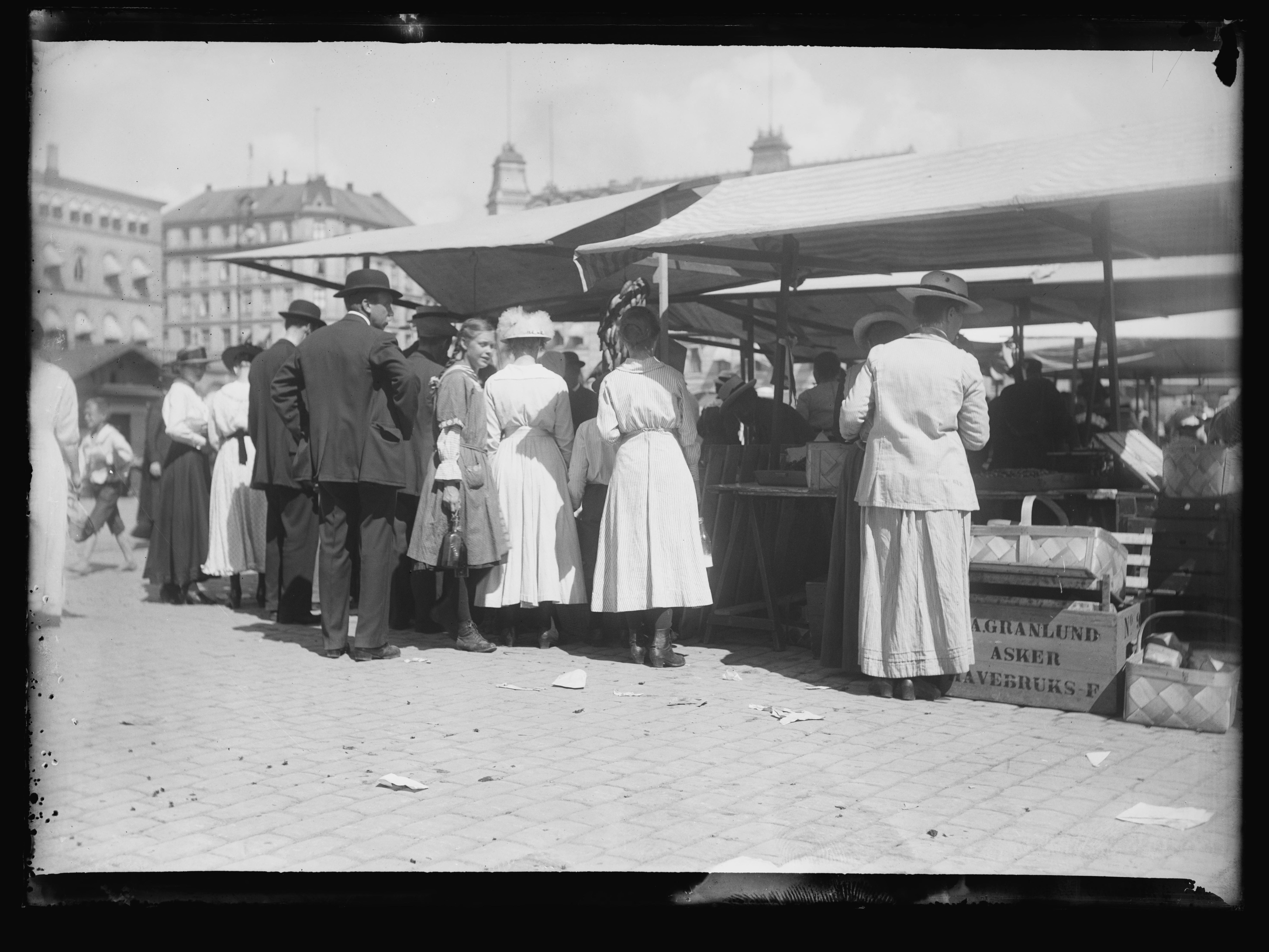
Circa 1910

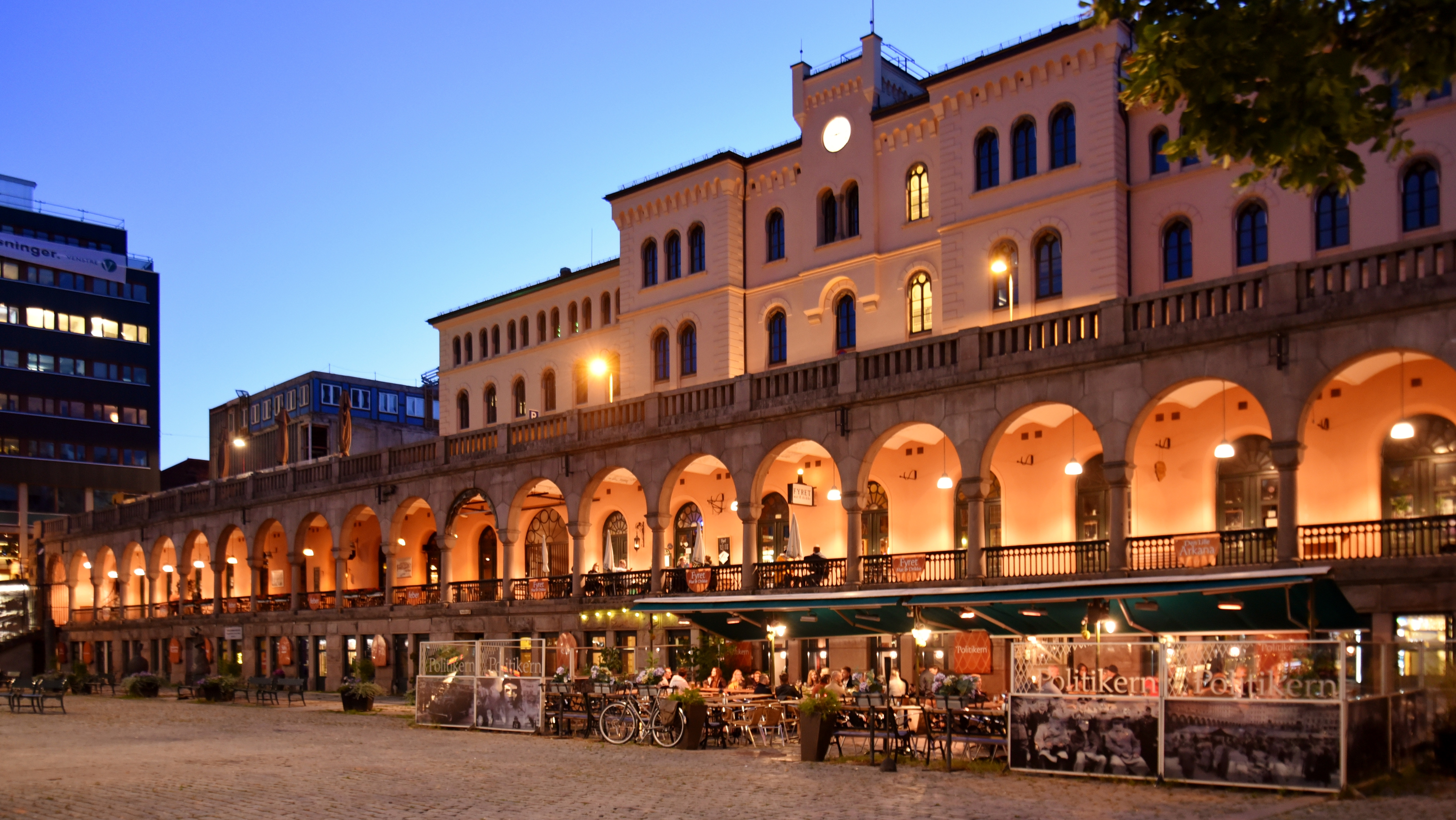
Møllergata 19, August 2019

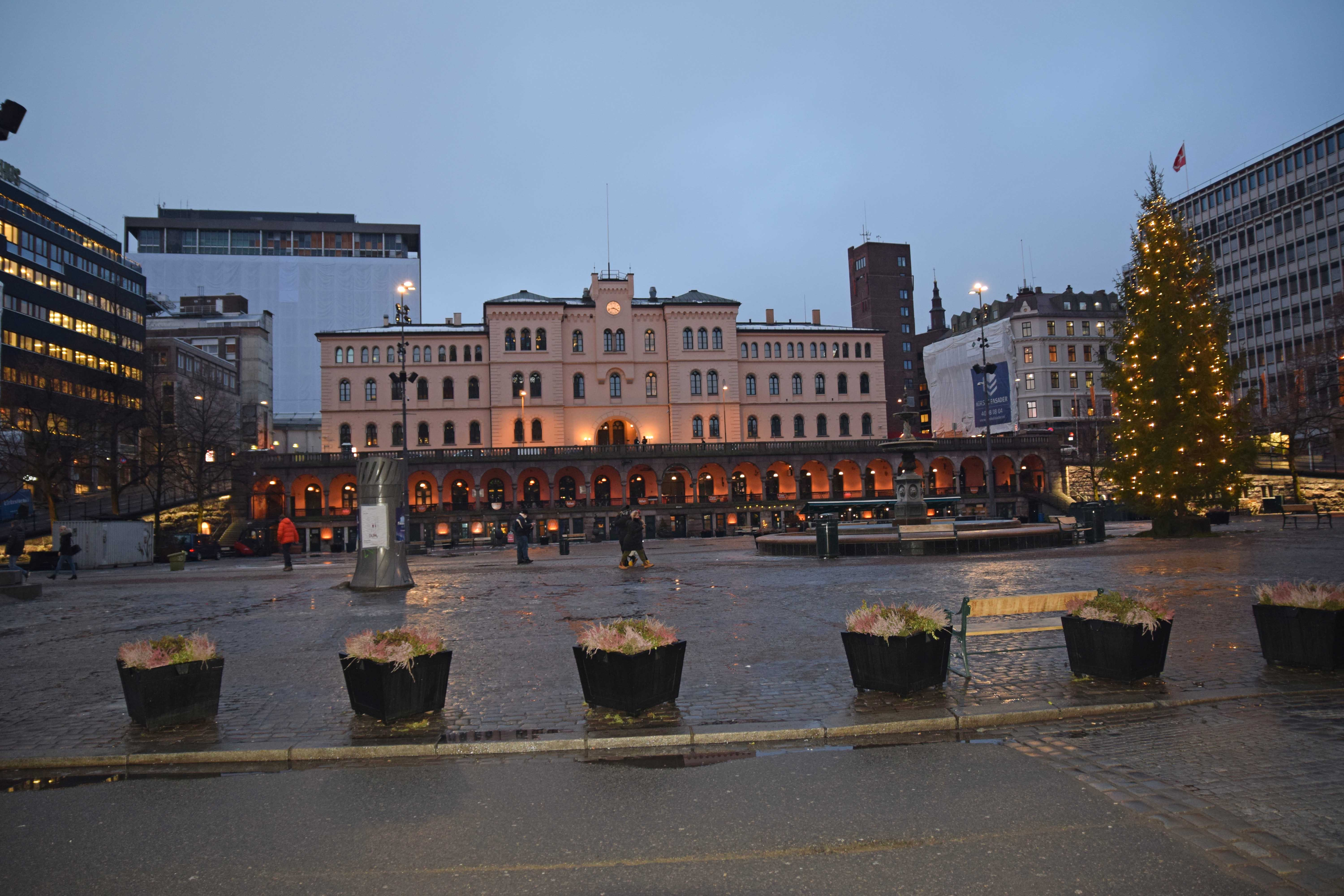
December 2018

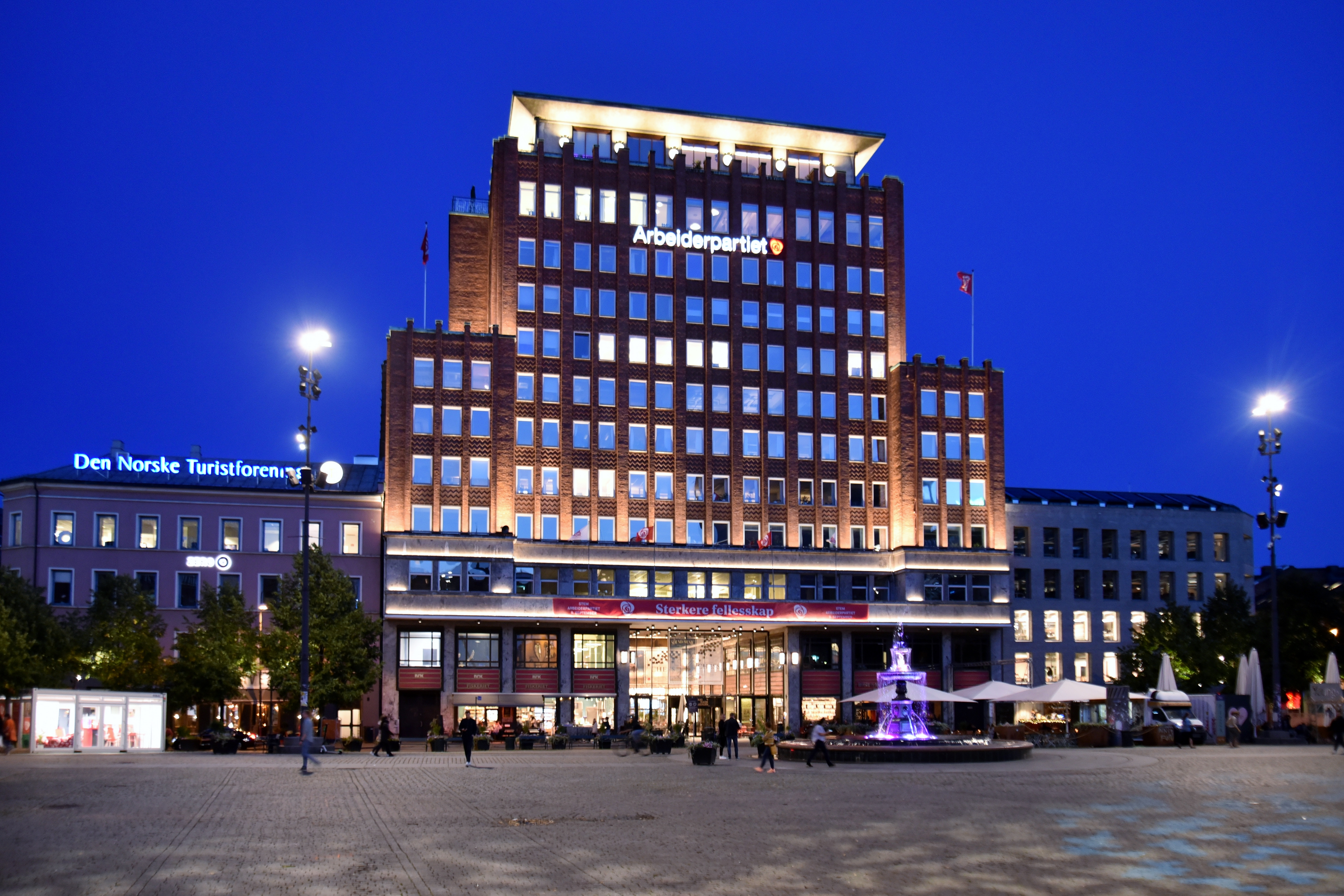
Night view of the Folketeatret in Youngstorget, August 2019

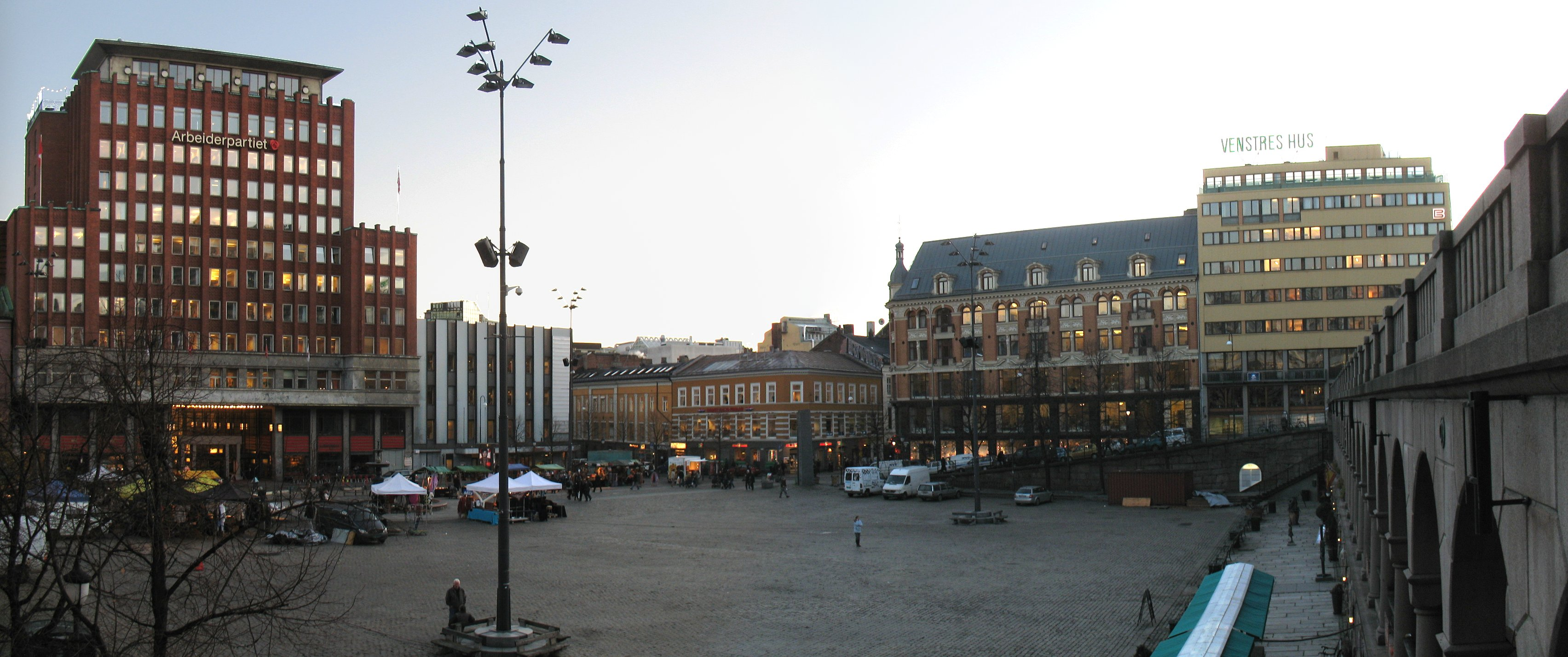
Youngstorget, November 2008
