= The Snowman (Nesbø novel) =

2007 Jo Nesbø novel

- First edition (Norwegian)
- Author: Jo Nesbø
- Original title: Snømannen
- Language: Norwegian, English
- Series: Harry Hole (#7)
- Genre: Crime fiction, Horror fiction
- Publisher: Aschehoug
- Publication date: 2007
- Publication place: Norway
- Pages: 438
- ISBN: 978-82-03-19212-8
- OCLC: 213225595
- LC Class: PT8951.24.E83 S56 2007
- Preceded by: The Redeemer
- Followed by: The Leopard

Jo Nesbø talks about The Snowman on Bookbits radio.

The Snowman (Norwegian: Snømannen) is a 2007 novel by Norwegian crime-writer Jo Nesbø. It is the seventh entry in his Harry Hole series.

== Plot ==
In 1980, a married woman has illicit sex with a lover while her adolescent son waits in a car outside; their lovemaking is disturbed when they think somebody is looking at them from outside the window, but it turns out to be only a snowman.

Twenty-four years later, Norwegian police inspector Harry Hole investigates a string of murders of women around Oslo. His FBI training leads him to search for links between the cases, and he finds two of them—each victim is a married mother, and a snowman appears at every murder scene.

Looking through cold cases, Hole realises that he is tracking Norway's earliest known serial killer. Most of the victims vanished after the first snowfall of winter, and snowmen were found near each scene. Further digging leads Hole and his team, including newcomer Katrine Bratt, to suspect that paternity issues with the victims’ children may be a motive for the murders. They discover that all the victims' children have different biological fathers from the men they believe to be their fathers. After DNA testing, results lead the investigation down a few wrong turns, and several suspects are eliminated from the inquiry.

Within a short time, Hole and Bratt are romantically drawn together, although Hole does not pursue her overtly. He sees her as a kindred spirit and a brilliant, dedicated detective in her own right. However, suspicion falls on Bratt being the killer after she attempts to frame one of the prime suspects. Hole chases her across Norway and catches up with her at a previously discovered murder site. She is apprehended and committed to a psychiatric unit. Hole's superiors, concerned that Bratt's arrest for the murders will damage their reputation, suggest putting Hole forward as a scapegoat for the press. Hole’s superior, Gunnar Hagen, intervenes and offers himself as a scapegoat in Hole’s stead.

When another victim is discovered, Hole realises that the killer is still at large. When a chance comment triggers a random thought, he makes a vital connection that ultimately leads him to the identity of the true perpetrator. His success in finally apprehending the killer obviates any need for a scapegoat, and Bratt, after further mental stability checks, returns to her post in Bergen.

== Reception ==
Thomas Kaufmann, on an article written for the Washington Independent Review of Books, states this about the book:

The Snowman gives us suspense and a veritable gallery of memorable suspects makes it a great read. Once Alfred Hitchcock talked about people taking a roller-coaster ride – how they would scream going down the hill, and laugh when they were finished. Some people like to be entertained in this way, Hitch said, and he was just a fellow who built roller coasters. The Snowman is a first-class roller-coaster ride.

== Film adaptation ==
A film adaptation of the novel The Snowman was developed by British production company Working Title Films. In 2013, Martin Scorsese was attached to direct the film, but was replaced by Tomas Alfredson in 2014. On 8 September 2015, Michael Fassbender was in talks to join the film for the lead role, with Rebecca Ferguson following on 14 October 2015, to play the female lead role. Alfredson co-produced the film under his Another Park Film production banner, starting production in January 2016. The film was released in the UK two years later on 13 October 2017. Unlike the novel, the film was panned by critics.

== Sources ==
- Larsen, Turid (2 June 2007). "Harry Hole holder koken". Dagsavisen (in Norwegian). Archived from the original on August 19, 2007.
- "Online Catalog: Snømannen / Jo Nesbø". The Library of Congress.
- Oksnes, Bernt Jakob (June 6, 2011). "Harrytur". Dagbladet (in Norwegian). Archived from the original on October 14, 2012.
