= Harry Hole =

Protagonist in crime novels by Jo Nesbø

- First appearance: The Bat (1997)
- Created by: Jo Nesbø
- Portrayed by: Michael Fassbender (film); Tobias Santelmann (television)

In-universe information
- Gender: Male
- Occupation: Police detective
- Affiliation: Oslo Police Department
- Family: Søs Hole (sister); Olav Hole (father); Rakel Fauke (wife); Oleg Fauke (adopted son)
- Nationality: Norwegian

Harry Hole (Norwegian pronunciation: [ˈhôːlə] WHO-lə) is the main character in a series of crime novels written by Norwegian author Jo Nesbø. The name is derived from Old Norse Hólar, the plural form of hóll, meaning "round and isolated hill." Harry's surname is also the name of a historic Norwegian town (Hole, Norway) with a heritage that goes back to the Viking Age.

Hole is drawn as a brilliant, introverted, and obsessively driven detective. He has few friends and often clashes with colleagues, but his work and skill are so widely known and respected that he is considered a specialist, leading him to sometimes consult on cases in other cities and countries. Throughout the novels, he sometimes uses unorthodox and illegal methods in his investigations. A common focus of the novel series is Hole's struggles with alcoholism and depression, as well as how his mental health suffers as a result of his morally questionable actions and the brutal nature of the crimes he investigates. The novel series eventually shows Hole recognizing the harmful nature of his work and increasingly problematic behavior, prompting him to leave the police force. Despite this, later novels show Hole continually finding reason to return to Oslo and assist new criminal investigations, despite his own initial reluctance and the protests of his loved ones.

Critics liken the personality of Harry Hole to those of the famous literary detectives such as Sherlock Holmes, Hercule Poirot, Jules Maigret, and Nero Wolfe. According to Jo Nesbø himself, the character is inspired by and a tribute to Michael Connelly's character Harry Bosch. The novels are frequent bestsellers.

== Character ==
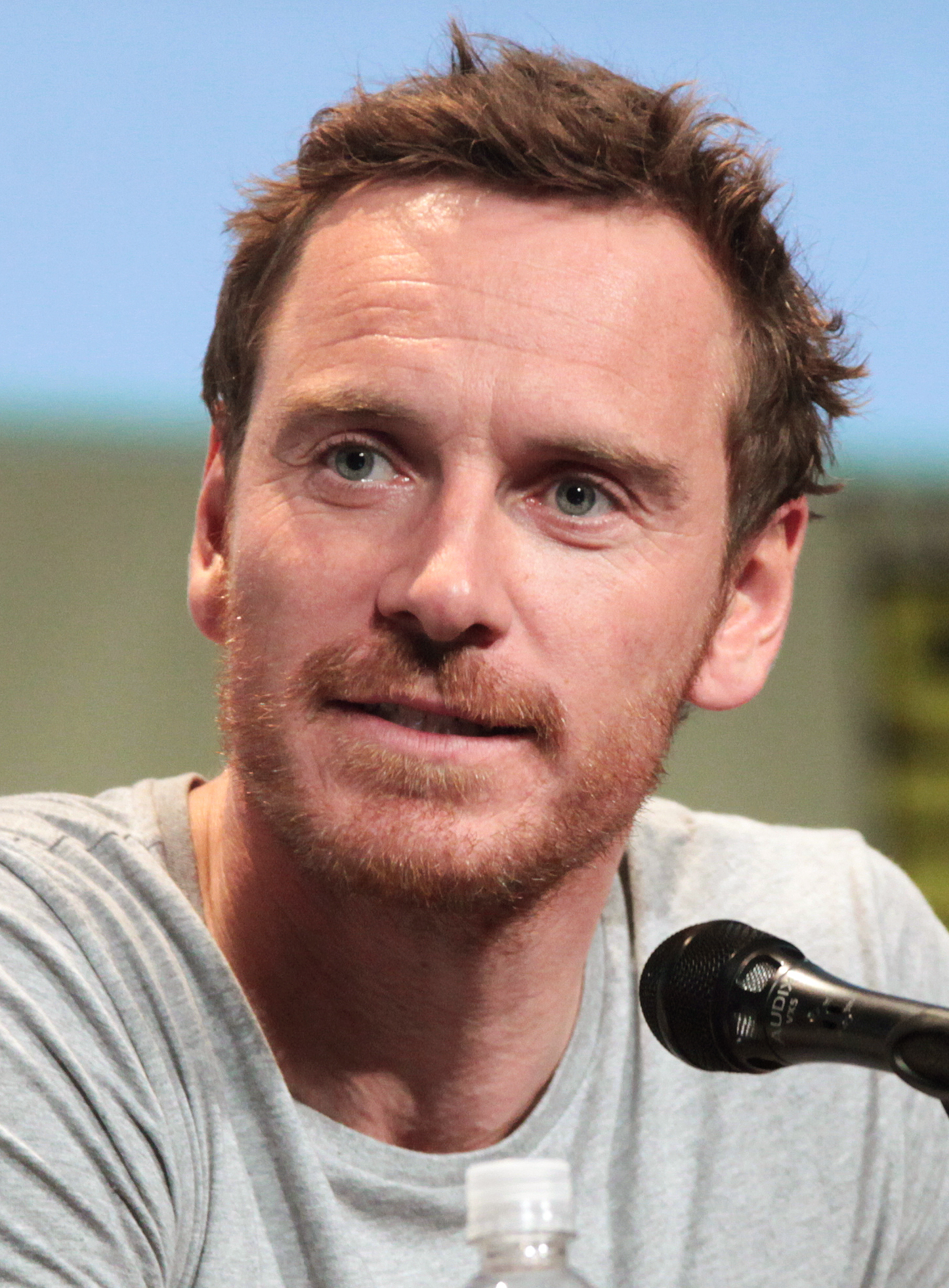
Michael Fassbender (pictured in 2015) portrays the main protagonist Harry Hole in the 2017 film adaptation of the seventh novel entry, The Snowman

Harry Hole is introduced in The Bat as a police officer with the Oslo Crime Squad. Born in 1965, Harry's mother, a descendant of the Sami people, dies due to cancer while he is in his twenties. Harry never has a close relationship with his father Olav, a former teacher, but is deeply attached to his younger sister Søs, who has Down syndrome. Taxi driver Øystein Eikeland is an old school friend of Harry's and one of the few people he is close to. Introverted and prone to depression, Hole is a chain-smoker alcoholic when first introduced, though he later recognizes his addiction and is considered a recovering alcoholic in later books. His encounters with assassins, corruption, and serial killers throughout the novels often strengthen his cynical views and his desire to escape reminders of his experiences and traumas.

Harry Hole's home address is in Sofies Gate in Bislett, located in the author's own home city of Oslo. Many of the stories involve extensive background details and descriptions of real locations such as the actual Oslo Police Department headquarters. Hole regularly interacts with city residents and immigrants from a variety of ethnic and social backgrounds. Many of the novels feature his favorite "watering hole," Restaurant Schrøder (Schrøder's, for short) in St. Hanshaugen.

Along with standard police training, Hole undertakes specialized training in interrogation techniques and firearms at the FBI. His problematic and often unsocial behavior, as well as his obsessive tendencies during investigations, brings him into repeated conflict with his superiors and some colleagues. Bjarne Møller, head of the Oslo Police Department, often shields Hole from being fired, believing he is a brilliant detective and vital to certain investigations. This repeated protection results in Harry feeling loyal and close to Møller. Others in the police department whom he comes to trust as friends include Beate Lønn and Bjørn Holm (both in the forensics division), Katrine Bratt (a Bergen detective who helps secure specialist information), and Gunnar Hagen (Harry's former senior officer prior to Phantom). Hole's skills become renowned enough that he is considered a specialist, leading him to be sought for occasional consultation by authorities in other cities and countries. In the first novel, The Bat, he travels to Sydney, Australia to aid the Australian police (who refer to him as "Harry Holy"). In the second novel, Cockroaches, he is called to Thailand to investigate the murder of the Norwegian ambassador.

Outside of the department, Hole develops a serious relationship with Rakel Fauke. Her son from a previous relationship, Oleg, comes to view Harry as a father figure, sometimes calling him "dad." After the seventh novel, The Snowman, Harry's relationship with Rakel suffers. This, along with recent trauma, compels Hole to leave Oslo and the police force. The next novel The Leopard shows Harry living in self-imposed exile in Hong Kong. Kaja Solness, a new Norwegian Crime Squad officer, asks him to return to Oslo to help investigate a possible serial killing. Learning his father Olav is also ill and likely to soon die, Hole agrees to help and returns to Oslo. During the story, Olav asks his son to assist in his suicide in order to end his pain, but Harry cannot bring himself to do so. At the end of the book, Harry has a brief reunion with Rakel before then visiting the imprisoned killer of The Snowman. It is implied that Harry then aids in the criminal's own suicide. Disturbed by his recent experiences, Harry determines to return to Hong Kong for good.

The next book Phantom depicts Harry returning to Oslo yet again some time later, this time because Rakel's son Oleg has been arrested for murder. Harry finds out the truth behind the murder, but is then shot and the book ends without clarifying if he will survive or not. Harry is revealed to be alive and living again in Oslo in the tenth novel Police. Deciding his obsessive pursuit of criminals has cost him too much, he now lectures at the Police College and resumes a relationship with Rakel. A series of killings leads his former colleagues to seek him out for help. Following these events, Harry marries Rakel and legally adopts Oleg as his son. He promises he is done with police work, but finds himself drawn into another investigation in the following novel The Thirst.

== Novels ==
- In Flaggermusmannen (1997), translated as The Bat (2012), Hole is sent to Sydney, Australia, to aid the Australian police in their investigation of the murder of a Norwegian citizen.
- In Kakerlakkene (1998), translated as Cockroaches (2013), Hole is sent to Thailand to investigate the murder of the Norwegian ambassador.
- In Rødstrupe (2000), translated as The Redbreast (2006), Hole encounters Neo-Nazism and the legacy of World War II as he tracks an assassin planning an attack on a prominent member of the establishment.
- In Sorgenfri (2002), translated as Nemesis (2008), Hole investigates a fatal bank robbery and is implicated in the apparent murder of an ex-girlfriend.
- In Marekors (2003), translated as The Devil's Star (2005), Hole investigates a series of serial killings and suspects a fellow policeman of criminal activity. The popularity of this novel led to it being the first Harry Hole book to be translated into English, followed by The Redbreast.
- In Frelseren (2005), translated as The Redeemer (2009), Hole is on the trail of a Croatian hitman who kills a Salvation Army officer during a Christmas street concert.
- In Snømannen (2007), translated as The Snowman (2010), Hole struggles to identify Norway's first serial killer, who seems to have resurfaced years after their last crime.
- Panserhjerte (2009), translated as The Leopard (2011). Having left the police force and exiled himself to Hong Kong following the events of The Snowman, Harry is now asked to return to Oslo to unofficially aid in the investigation of a serial killer.
- In Gjenferd (2011), translated as Phantom (2012), Hole once again returns to Oslo from Hong Kong when his ex-girlfriend Rakel's son Oleg is arrested for murder. His investigation draws him into Oslo's drug scene.
- Politi (2013), translated as Police (2013). Living in Oslo again and working as a lecturer at the Police College, Hole is asked to help track down a serial killer targeting police officers.
- In Tørst (2017), translated as The Thirst (2017), Harry promises his wife he is done with police work, but is compelled to investigate when a killer who vanished years earlier suddenly resurfaces, now masquerading as a vampirist.
- Kniv (2019), translated as Knife. Waking up with a ferocious hangover, Harry finds his hands and clothes covered in blood. Coming face-to-face with an old, deadly foe, Hole faces perhaps his darkest personal challenge yet.
- Blodmåne (2023), translated as Killing Moon, is the latest book in the series.

== In other media ==
=== Film ===
The seventh novel in the series, The Snowman, was adapted as a film in 2017 and starred Michael Fassbender as Harry Hole, with Rebecca Ferguson, Charlotte Gainsbourg, Ronan Vibert, Val Kilmer and J.K. Simmons.

=== Television ===
Nesbø himself adapted the fifth Hole novel The Devil's Star as a series for Netflix, with Øystein Karlsen directing. Tobias Santelmann portrayed Harry Hole.
