= List of Jewish deportees from Norway during World War II =

During the Nazi occupation of Norway, German authorities deported about 768 individuals of Jewish background to concentration camps outside of Norway. Between 28 and 34 of those deported survived their continued imprisonment (following their deportation). Because the Norwegian police and German authorities kept records of these victims, researchers have been able to compile information about the deportees. (Note: Some discrepancies about the numbers remain. For example, German documents related to the transit of prisoners on the Donau indicate that 530 were deported from Oslo, whereas the list compiled by Ottosen (1992) indicates that 534 were on board, but this includes Helene Johansen and Mirjam Kristiansen, who were deported on the Donau, but on another date. Kai Feinberg, who was a prisoner on the Donau, was ordered to compile a list of prisoners at the time, and his recollection was that there were 532 on board. Mendelsohn allows that some individuals may have been counted twice, others may have been omitted. The list provided here is based on Ottosen's list, with annotations where these are available. It has been checked for possible duplicates based on name and date of birth. In most sources, the number of survivors is commonly cited as 26; Ottosen (1992) lists 26 individuals as survivors, but omits Harry Meyer, who was captured in the context of the Kvarstad incident, and Robert Savosnick, probably due to an error on his part; as Savosnick is listed as a survivor in the master of list of deportees. This list includes all those who the Nazi authorities considered Jewish. A few of these did not consider themselves Jewish. None of the available literature seeks to ascertain which of the victims were or were not Jewish according to halacha.)

== List of Jews deported from Norway ==
This list is largely based on Kristian Ottosen's list, with annotations from other sources. Survivors indicated in bold.

Last name	First name	Date of birth	Arrested in	County	Profession	Arrested on	Deported on	Ship	Date of death	Age at death	Location of death	Auschwitz serial number
Abosch	Abraham	15-Dec-1869	Skiptvet	Østfold	Merchant	26-Oct-1942	26-Nov-1942	Donau	1-Dec-1942	72	Auschwitz	
Adler	Ernst	3-Sep-1910	Oslo	Oslo		26-Oct-1942	26-Nov-1942	Donau		32	Auschwitz	79064
Appelsin	Elka	08-Dec-1878	Oslo	Oslo	Homemaker	26-Nov-1942	24-Feb-1943	Gotenland	3-Mar-1943	64	Auschwitz	
Aronstam	Anna	27-Sep-1907	Oslo	Oslo	Seamstress	26-Nov-1942	26-Nov-1942	Donau	1-Dec-1942	35	Auschwitz	
Aronstam	Menasse	6-Jul-1868	Oslo	Oslo	Shoe worker	26-Nov-1942	26-Nov-1942	Donau	1-Dec-1942	74	Auschwitz	
Aronstam	Rebekka	18-Dec-1878	Oslo	Oslo	Homemaker	26-Nov-1942	26-Nov-1942	Donau	1-Dec-1942	63	Auschwitz	
Aronstam	Sofie	22-Dec-1915	Oslo	Oslo	Seamstresspl	26-Nov-1942	26-Nov-1942	Donau	1-Dec-1942	26	Auschwitz	
Arsch	Bertha	28-Jan-1882	Oslo	Oslo	Homemaker	26-Nov-1942	26-Nov-1942	Donau	1-Dec-1942	60	Auschwitz	
Arsch	Jakob Samuel	3-Nov-1913	Oslo	Oslo	Retiree	27-Oct-1942	26-Nov-1942	Donau	1-Dec-1942	29	Auschwitz	79066
Arsch	Josef	14-Feb-1918	Oslo	Oslo	Office clerk	27-Oct-1942	26-Nov-1942	Donau	2-Jan-1943	24	Auschwitz	79065
Arsch	Moritz	15-Jun-1877	Oslo	Oslo	Saleseman	25-Nov-1942	24-Feb-1943	Gotenland	3-Mar-1943	65	Auschwitz	
Arsch	Sara	5-Oct-1908	Oslo	Oslo	Retail worker	26-Nov-1942	26-Nov-1942	Donau	1-Dec-1942	34	Auschwitz	
Arsch	Tancum	9-Dec-1885	Oslo	Oslo	Watchmaker	27-Oct-1942	26-Nov-1942	Donau	1-Dec-1942	56	Auschwitz	
**Asberg**	**Benno**	8-Jul-1912	Oslo	Oslo	Salesman	26-Oct-1942	26-Nov-1942	Donau	Survived			79065
Aschkanaze	Edda	12-Sep-1904	Oslo	Oslo	Stenographer	26-Nov-1942	26-Nov-1942	Donau	1-Dec-1942	38	Auschwitz	
Aschkanaze	Feige Taube Fanny	29-May-1880	Oslo	Oslo	Homemaker	26-Nov-1942	26-Nov-1942	Donau	1-Dec-1942	62	Auschwitz	
Aschkanaze	Sarah	3-Jul-1906	Oslo	Oslo	Translating stenographer	26-Nov-1942	26-Nov-1942	Donau	1-Dec-1942	36	Auschwitz	
Barchan	Glenny	19-Jun-1899	Oslo	Oslo	Retail worker	26-Nov-1942	26-Nov-1942	Donau	1-Dec-1942	43	Auschwitz	
Basseches	Marie	1-Oct-1883	Tønsberg	Vestfold	Homemaker	26-Nov-1942	26-Nov-1942	Donau	1-Dec-1942	59	Auschwitz	
Basseches	Max	4-Aug-1879	Tønsberg	Vestfold	Merchant	27-Oct-1942	26-Nov-1942	Donau	1-Dec-1942	63	Auschwitz	
Becker	Ada Abigal	20-Jan-1922	Stavanger	Rogaland	Student	26-Nov-1942	24-Feb-1943	Gotenland	3-Mar-1943	21	Auschwitz	
Becker	David	24-Jun-1898	Skien	Telemark	Merchant	2-Jun-1942	26-Nov-1942	Monte Rosa	1-Dec-1942	44	Auschwitz	81966
Becker	David	1-Dec-1900	Oslo	Oslo	Transport manager	27-Oct-1942	26-Nov-1942	Donau	5-Feb-1943	42	Auschwitz	
Becker	Frida	25-Jun-1900	Oslo	Oslo	Office clerk	26-Nov-1942	26-Nov-1942	Donau	1-Dec-1942	42	Auschwitz	
Becker	Hille	15-Aug-1885	Stavanger	Rogaland	Watchmaker	26-Nov-1942	26-Nov-1942	Donau	1-Dec-1942	57	Auschwitz	
Becker	Ida	4-Feb-1917	Bergen	Hordaland	Homemaker	26-Nov-1942	24-Feb-1943	Gotenland	3-Mar-1943	26	Auschwitz	
Becker	Josef	26-May-1916	Bergen	Hordaland	Retail clerk	27-Oct-1942	26-Nov-1942	Donau		26	Auschwitz	79065
Becker	Judith	2-Aug-1888	Stavanger	Rogaland	Massage therapist	26-Nov-1942	24-Feb-1943	Gotenland	3-Mar-1943	54	Auschwitz	
Becker	Louis	6-Jan-1906	Skien	Telemark	Merchant	20-Jun-1942	24-Feb-1943	Gotenland	10-Aug-1943	37	Auschwitz	105256
Becker	Mendel	15-Oct-1862	Oslo	Oslo	Retiree	23-Feb-1942	24-Feb-1943	Gotenland	3-Mar-1943	80	Auschwitz	
Becker	Mina	25-May-1869	Oslo	Oslo	Homemaker	23-Feb-1942	24-Feb-1943	Gotenland	3-Mar-1943	73	Auschwitz	
Becker	Sam	8-Apr-1941	Bergen	Hordaland	Child	24-Nov-1942	24-Feb-1943	Gotenland	3-Mar-1943	1	Auschwitz	
Becker	Sara	20-May-1912	Oslo	Oslo	Retail clerk	26-Nov-1942	26-Nov-1942	Donau	1-Dec-1942	30	Auschwitz	
Becker	Wulff	18-Sep-1907	Oslo	Oslo	Physician	12-Jul-1941	26-Nov-1942	Monte Rosa	17-Feb-1943	35	Auschwitz	81974
Behak	Nils	27-Mar-1903	Oslo	Oslo	Merchant	27-Oct-1942	26-Nov-1942	Donau	5-Jan-1943	39	Auschwitz	
Bekker	Esther	3-Dec-1892	Trondheim	Sør-Trøndelag	Homemaker	25-Nov-1942	24-Feb-1943	Gotenland	3-Mar-1943	50	Auschwitz	
Bekker	Moses	20-Jun-1884	Trondheim	Sør-Trøndelag	Businessman	6-Oct-1942	24-Feb-1943	Gotenland	3-Mar-1943	58	Auschwitz	
Benkow	Annie Louise	30-Jan-1895	Bærum	Akershus	Entrepreneur	26-Nov-1942	26-Nov-1942	Donau	1-Dec-1942	47	Auschwitz	
Berenhaut	Bernhard	19-May-1881	Oslo	Oslo	Merchant	27-Oct-1942	26-Nov-1942	Donau	1-Dec-1942	61	Auschwitz	
Berenhaut	Gertrud	12-Feb-1884	Oslo	Oslo	Homemaker	26-Nov-1942	26-Nov-1942	Donau	1-Dec-1942	58	Auschwitz	
**Berg**	**Josef**	2-Aug-1917	Oslo	Oslo	Language teacher	9-Jun-1942	26-Nov-1942	Monte Rosa	Survived			81949
Berg	Ruben	20-Jan-1920	Oslo	Oslo	Mechanic	26-Oct-1942	26-Nov-1942	Donau		22	Auschwitz	79077
Berger	Marie	24-Apr-1874	Oslo	Oslo	Homemaker	26-Oct-1942	24-Feb-1943	Gotenland	3-Mar-1943	68	Auschwitz	
Bergmann	David	10-Feb-1925	Oslo	Oslo	Apprentice	26-Oct-1942	26-Nov-1942	Donau	1-Jan-1943	17	Auschwitz	
Bergmann	Else Marie	16-Sep-1922	Oslo	Oslo	Office clerk	26-Nov-1942	26-Nov-1942	Donau	1-Dec-1942	20	Auschwitz	
Bergmann	Martin Moses	6-Jul-1896	Oslo	Oslo	Railroad worker	26-Oct-1942	26-Nov-1942	Donau	11-Jan-1943	46	Auschwitz	
Bergmann	Ruth	8-Feb-1896	Oslo	Oslo	Homemaker	26-Nov-1942	26-Nov-1942	Donau	1-Dec-1942	46	Auschwitz	
Berkowitz	Adolf	6-Apr-1912	Tønsberg	Vestfold	Blacksmith	27-Oct-1942	26-Nov-1942	Donau			Auschwitz.	79069
Berkowitz	Betty	9-Feb-1913	Tønsberg	Vestfold	Homemaker	26-Nov-1942	26-Nov-1942	Donau	1-Dec-1942	29	Auschwitz	
Bermann	David	7-Oct-1899	Oslo	Oslo	Businessman	1-Apr-1942	26-Nov-1942	Monte Rosa	22-Jan-1943	43	Auschwitz	
Bernstein	Abraham	1-Nov-1882	Fredrikstad	Østfold	Merchant	26-Oct-1942	26-Nov-1942	Donau	1-Dec-1942	60	Auschwitz	
Bernstein	Gisela	21-Mar-1888	Oslo	Oslo	Homemaker	26-Nov-1942	26-Nov-1942	Donau	1-Dec-1942	54	Auschwitz	
Bernstein	Herman	1-May-1874	Oslo	Oslo	Watchmaker	21-Aug-1942	20-Nov-1942	Monte Rosa		68	Auschwitz	
Bernstein	Mauritz	1-Apr-1869	Oslo	Oslo	Merchant	27-Oct-1942	26-Nov-1942	Donau	1-Dec-1942	73	Auschwitz	
Bernstein	Paul	11-Oct-1903	Oslo	Oslo	Physician	13-Aug-1942	20-Nov-1942	Monte Rosa	7-Jan-1943	39	Auschwitz	80024
Bernstein	Rebekka	27-Apr-1873	Oslo	Oslo	Homemaker	26-Nov-1942	26-Nov-1942	Donau	1-Dec-1942	69	Auschwitz	
Bernstein	Richard	12-Sep-1882	Oslo	Oslo	Office clerk	27-Oct-1942	26-Nov-1942	Monte Rosa	21-Jan-1943	60	Auschwitz	
Bernstein	Samuel	14-Feb-1886	Oslo	Oslo	Merchant	27-Oct-1942	26-Nov-1942	Donau	30-Dec-1942	56	Auschwitz	
Bernstein	Seiki	10-May-1886	Oslo	Oslo	Fruit merchant	27-Oct-1942	26-Nov-1942	Donau	1-Dec-1942	56	Auschwitz	
Bernstein	Sigmund	7-Aug-1922	Oslo	Oslo	Student of engineering	27-Oct-1942	26-Nov-1942	Donau	5-Feb-1943	20	Auschwitz	•
Bersohn	David	10-Dec-1863	Jevnaker	Oppland	Merchant	27-Oct-1942	24-Feb-1943	Gotenland	3-Mar-1943	79	Auschwitz	
Bersohn	Isak Meyer	23-Dec-1902	Jevnaker	Oppland	Gardener	26-Oct-1942	26-Nov-1942	Donau	15-Jan-1943	40	Auschwitz	79074
Bersohn	Markus Alex.	1-Dec-1904	Jevnaker	Oppland	Merchant	26-Oct-1942	26-Nov-1942	Donau	9-Jan-1943	38	Auschwitz	79073
Bild	Benjamin	8-Aug-1912	Rælingen	Akershus	Mechanic	1-Mar-1941	27-Apr-1941	Other route	26-Dec-1941	29	Gross Rosen	
Bild	Herman	15-Aug-1883	Ås	Akershus	Shoemaker	27-Oct-1942	26-Nov-1942	Donau	1-Dec-1942	59	Auschwitz	
Bild	Ida	23-Jul-1922	Ås	Akershus	Student	26-Nov-1942	26-Nov-1942	Donau	1-Dec-1942	20	Auschwitz	
Bild	Leopold	19-Oct-1910	Ås	Akershus	Musician	27-Oct-1942	26-Nov-1942	Donau	1-Feb-1943	32	Auschwitz	
Bild	Philip Moses	14-Feb-1920	Oslo	Oslo	Artisan	27-Oct-1942	26-Nov-1942	Donau		22	Auschwitz	
Bild	Thina	15-Jul-1877	Ås	Akershus	Homemaker	26-Nov-1942	26-Nov-1942	Donau	1-Dec-1942	65	Auschwitz	
Bing	Otto Leo	6-Dec-1883	Oslo	Oslo	Sales agent	24-Mar-1942	20-Nov-1942	Monte Rosa	14-Jan-1943	59	Auschwitz	
Bjerke	Sara Vesla	27-Jul-1920	Oslo	Oslo	Packaging	14-Jan-1943	6-Oct-1943	Other route	20-Nov-1943	23	Auschwitz	
Blått	Hilel	15-May-1893	Oslo	Oslo	Shoemaker	27-Oct-1942	24-Feb-1943	Other route		50	Auschwitz	
Blått	Rebekka	1-May-1894	Oslo	Oslo	Homemaker	26-Nov-1942	24-Feb-1943	Gotenland	3-Mar-1943	48	Auschwitz	
Blomberg	Selig	10-Feb-1882	Oslo	Oslo	Merchant	2-Sep-1942	26-Nov-1942	Monte Rosa		61	Auschwitz	
Bodd	Anna	2-Apr-1908	Oslo	Oslo	Retail clerk	26-Nov-1942	26-Nov-1942	Donau	1-Dec-1942	34	Auschwitz	
Bodd	Anna	4-Sep-1929	Oslo	Oslo	Pupil	26-Nov-1942	26-Nov-1942	Donau	1-Dec-1942	13	Auschwitz	
Bodd	Arvid	6-May-1922	Lørenskog	Akershus	Tailor apprentice	27-Oct-1942	26-Nov-1942	Donau	20-Feb-1943	20	Auschwitz	
Bodd	Benjamin	6-Jan-1926	Lørenskog	Akershus	Pupil	27-Oct-1942	26-Nov-1942	Donau	20-Feb-1943	17	Auschwitz	79084
Bodd	Bernhard	17-Jul-1912	Oslo	Oslo	Chocolate factory worker	27-Oct-1942	26-Nov-1942	Donau	20-Apr-1945	32	Skutt u/transp.	79080
Bodd	Isak	26-Sep-1927	Lørenskog	Akershus	Pupil	27-Oct-1942	26-Nov-1942	Donau	1-Dec-1942	15	Auschwitz	
Bodd	Jacob	29-Apr-1894	Oslo	Oslo	Rabbi	27-Oct-1942	26-Nov-1942	Donau	Feb 43	48	Auschwitz	79070
Bodd	Jente	14-Sep-1902	Oslo	Oslo	Homemaker	26-Nov-1942	26-Nov-1942	Donau	1-Dec-1942	40	Auschwitz	
Bodd	Kaja	24-May-1906	Oslo	Oslo	Homemaker	26-Nov-1942	26-Nov-1942	Donau	1-Dec-1942	36	Auschwitz	
Bodd	Leiser	10-Jul-1872	Oslo	Oslo	Sales agent	27-Oct-1942	26-Nov-1942	Donau	1-Dec-1942	70	Auschwitz	
Bodd	Liv	6-Jan-1926	Lørenskog	Akershus	Seamstress	26-Nov-1942	26-Nov-1942	Donau	1-Dec-1942	16	Auschwitz	
Bodd	Manja	28-Sep-1931	Oslo	Oslo	Pupil	26-Nov-1942	26-Nov-1942	Donau	1-Dec-1942	11	Auschwitz	
Bodd	Mary Dora	6-May-1922	Lørenskog	Akershus	Seamstress	26-Nov-1942	26-Nov-1942	Donau	1-Dec-1943	21	Auschwitz	
Bodd	Moritz Meyer	25-Jun-1903	Oslo	Oslo	Retail clerk	27-Oct-1942	26-Nov-1942	Donau		40	Auschwitz	79089
Bodd	Rakel	20-Nov-1897	Lørenskog	Akershus	Homemaker	26-Nov-1942	26-Nov-1942	Donau	1-Dec-1942	45	Auschwitz	
Bodd	Salomon	10-Jan-1898	Lørenskog	Akershus	Tailor	27-Oct-1942	26-Nov-1942	Donau	26-Jan-1943	45	Auschwitz	79085
Bodd	Sofie Hanna	20-Sep-1913	Oslo	Oslo	Retail clerk	26-Nov-1942	26-Nov-1942	Donau	1-Dec-1942	29	Auschwitz	
Bogomolno	Marie	24-Dec-1889	Oslo	Oslo	Homemaker	26-Nov-1942	26-Nov-1942	Donau	1-Dec-1942	52	Auschwitz	
Bogomolno	Salomon jr.	6-Sep-1926	Oslo	Oslo	Pupil	27-Oct-1941	26-Nov-1942	Donau	1-Dec-1942	16	Auschwitz	
Bogomolno	Salomon sen.	25-Feb-1891	Oslo	Oslo	Glassworks worker	27-Oct-1942	26-Nov-1942	Donau	1-Dec-1942	51	Auschwitz	
Borinsky	Alice	5-Jul-1892	Bergen	Hordaland	Homemaker	6-Jan-1943	24-Feb-1943	Gotenland	3-Mar-1943	50	Auschwitz	
Borinsky	Paul	27-Apr-1881	Bergen	Hordaland	Chemist	27-Oct-1942	26-Nov-1942	Donau	1-Dec-1942	61	Auschwitz	
Borochstein	Abraham	15-Sep-1892	Kristiansund	Møre og Romsdal	Merchant	27-Oct-1942	26-Nov-1942	Monte Rosa	1-Apr-1943	50	Auschwitz	81973
Borochstein	Julius Isak	5-Nov-1937	Kristiansund	Møre og Romsdal	Child	26-Nov-1942	24-Feb-1943	Gotenland	3-Mar-1943	5	Auschwitz	
Borochstein	Leopold	8-Jan-1932	Kristiansund	Møre og Romsdal	Pupil	26-Nov-1942	24-Feb-1943	Gotenland	3-Mar-1943	11	Auschwitz	
Borochstein	Mascha	4-Sep-1910	Kristiansund	Møre og Romsdal	Homemaker	26-Nov-1942	24-Feb-1943	Gotenland	3-Mar-1943	32	Auschwitz	
Borochstein	Philip	30-Oct-1933	Kristiansund	Møre og Romsdal	Pupil	26-Nov-1942	24-Feb-1943	Gotenland	3-Mar-1943	9	Auschwitz	
Borochstein	Rosa	8-Oct-1930	Kristiansund	Møre og Romsdal	Pupil	26-Nov-1942	24-Feb-1943	Gotenland	3-Mar-1943	12	Auschwitz	
Borochstein	Sonja Nannie	25-Aug-1936	Kristiansund	Møre og Romsdal	Pupil	26-Nov-1942	24-Feb-1943	Gotenland	3-Mar-1943	6	Auschwitz	
Braude	Benzel	15-Oct-1890	Oslo	Oslo	Sausage maker	26-Oct-1942	26-Nov-1942	Donau		52	Auschwitz	
Braude	Bertha Sara	21-Aug-1892	Oslo	Oslo	Seamstress	26-Nov-1942	26-Nov-1942	Donau	1-Dec-1942	50	Auschwitz	
Braude	Harry	21-Jun-1919	Oslo	Oslo	Tailor	27-Oct-1942	26-Nov-1942	Donau		23	Auschwitz	79072
Braude	Isak	2-Feb-1914	Oslo	Oslo	Chauffeur	27-Oct-1942	26-Nov-1942	Donau	7-Jan-1943	28	Auschwitz	79087
Buchmann	Bertha	20-Dec-1884	Trondheim	Sør-Trøndelag	Homemaker	26-Nov-1942	24-Feb-1943	Gotenland	3-Mar-1943	58	Auschwitz	
Caplan	Conrad	2-Dec-1922	Tromsø	Troms	Warehouse worker	21-Mar-1942	26-Nov-1942	Monte Rosa	10-Jan-1945	22	Transport	81956
Caplan	Daniel	15-Apr-1870	Tromsø	Troms	Merchant	26-Nov-1942	24-Feb-1943	Gotenland	3-Mar-1943	72	Auschwitz	
Caplan	Herze	18-Jun-1913	Tromsø	Troms	Merchant	18-Jun-1941	26-Nov-1942	Monte Rosa	3-Mar-1943	29	Auschwitz	
Caplan	Jacob	31-Dec-1903	Narvik	Nordland	Merchant	18-Jun-1941	26-Nov-1942	Monte Rosa	19-Mar-1943	39	Auschwitz	81954
Caplan	Solly	12-May-1908	Tromsø	Troms	Manager	18-Jun-1941	26-Nov-1942	Monte Rosa	16-Dec-1942	34	Auschwitz	81955
Claes	Alexander	16-Jan-1904	Oslo	Oslo	Barber	27-Oct-1942	26-Nov-1942	Donau	Mar 42	38	Auschwitz	79092
Claes	Arvid	17-May-1935	Oslo	Oslo	Pupil	26-Nov-1942	26-Nov-1942	Donau	1-Dec-1942	7	Auschwitz	
Claes	Bertha	13-Feb-1911	Oslo	Oslo	Factory worker	26-Nov-1942	26-Nov-1942	Donau	1-Dec-1942	31	Auschwitz	
Claes	Daniel	14-Dec-1905	Oslo	Oslo	Waiter	26-Nov-1942	26-Nov-1942	Donau	24-Feb-1943	37	Auschwitz	79091
Claes	Ida Iris	28-Jan-1930	Oslo	Oslo	Pupil	26-Nov-1942	26-Nov-1942	Donau	1-Dec-1942	12	Auschwitz	
Claes	Jan	2-Feb-1938	Oslo	Oslo	Child	26-Nov-1942	26-Nov-1942	Donau	1-Dec-1942	4	Auschwitz	
Claes	Rubin	5-Apr-1879	Oslo	Oslo	Greengrocer	27-Oct-1942	26-Nov-1942	Donau	1-Dec-1942	63	Auschwitz	
Claes	Sofie	3-Jun-1889	Oslo	Oslo	Homemaker	26-Nov-1942	26-Nov-1942	Donau	1-Dec-1942	53	Auschwitz	
Cohn	Fritz	28-Jun-1885	Asker	Akershus	Attorney	27-Oct-1942	26-Nov-1942	Donau	7-Jan-1943	57	Auschwitz	
**Cohn**	**Ludvig Paul**	11-Jun-1889	Oslo	Oslo	Businessman	23-Oct-1942	3-Aug-1944	Other route	Survived			
Cohn	Margot	2-Aug-1892	Asker	Akershus	Homemaker	26-Nov-1942	26-Nov-1942	Donau	1-Dec-1942	50	Auschwitz	
Dabrosin	Lina	10-Jun-1891	Oslo	Oslo	Homemaker	26-Nov-1942	26-Nov-1942	Donau	1-Dec-1942	51	Auschwitz	
Dabrosin	Samuel	15-Jan-1887	Oslo	Oslo	Painter	27-Oct-1942	26-Nov-1942	Donau	16-Feb-1943	56	Auschwitz	
Damelin	Benno	11-Oct-1924	Oslo	Oslo	Pupil	26-Nov-1942	26-Nov-1942	Donau	3-Mar-1943	18	Auschwitz	
Damelin	Israel	14-Jul-1888	Oslo	Oslo	Businessman	27-Oct-1942	26-Nov-1942	Donau	1-Dec-1942	54	Auschwitz	
Daus	Franz	16-Nov-1896	Bergen	Hordaland	Retiree	26-Oct-1942	26-Nov-1942	Donau	13-Dec-1942	46	Auschwitz	
Davidsen	Bernhard	25-May-1892	Strømmen	Akershus	Teamster	27-Oct-1942	26-Nov-1942	Donau	1-Dec-1942	50	Auschwitz	
Davidsen	David	13-Jan-1917	Strømmen	Akershus	Retail clerk	27-Oct-1942	26-Nov-1942	Donau	17-Feb-1943	26	Auschwitz	
Davidsen	John	10-Oct-1935	Strømmen	Akershus	Pupil	26-Nov-1942	26-Nov-1942	Donau	1-Dec-1942	7	Auschwitz	
Davidsen	Michael	17-Jan-1921	Bærum	Akershus	Jockey	27-Oct-1942	26-Nov-1942	Donau	31-Jan-1943	22	Auschwitz	
Davidsen	Nina	25-Apr-1895	Strømmen	Akershus	Homemaker	26-Nov-1942	26-Nov-1942	Donau	1-Dec-1942	47	Auschwitz	
Davidsen	Ruth	4-Jul-1924	Strømmen	Akershus	Installer	26-Nov-1942	26-Nov-1942	Donau	1-Dec-1942	18	Auschwitz	
Davidsen	Simon	13-Jan-1887	Oslo	Oslo	Retail clerk	27-Oct-1942	26-Nov-1942	Donau	14-Jan-1943	56	Auschwitz	
Dickman	Herman	28-Feb-1910	Oslo	Oslo	Bookkeeper	27-Oct-1942	26-Nov-1942	Donau	16-Jan-1943	32	Auschwitz	
Dickman	Meier	5-May-1881	Oslo	Oslo	Merchant	27-Oct-1942	26-Nov-1942	Donau	1-Dec-1942	61	Auschwitz	
Dickman	Sigurd	9-Nov-1915	Oslo	Oslo	Car mechanic	27-Oct-1942	26-Nov-1942	Donau	15-Feb-1943	27	Auschwitz	
Dobkes	Kjell	18-Feb-1923	Oslo	Oslo	High school student	27-Oct-1942	26-Nov-1942	Donau	2-Mar-1943	20	Auschwitz	
Dobkes	Moses Jacob	24-Dec-1887	Oslo	Oslo	Factory owner	27-Oct-1942	26-Nov-1942	Donau	24-Dec-1942	54		
**Doller**	**Friedrich**	3-Feb-1894	Grimstad	Aust-Agder	Technician	14-Oct-1943	10-Aug-1944	Other route	Survived		Stutthof	
**Doller**	**Grete**	6-Aug-1899	Grimstad	Aust-Agder	Homemaker	14-Oct-1943	10-Aug-1944	Other route	Survived		Stutthof	
Dsenselsky	Georg David	5-Aug-1895	Oslo	Oslo	Factory owner	27-Oct-1942	26-Nov-1942	Donau	Dec 42	47	Auschwitz	
Dsenselsky	Moritz Wulf	2-Feb-1892	Oslo	Oslo	Factory owner	27-Oct-1942	26-Nov-1942	Donau	Dec 42	50		
Dvoretsky	Lilly	29-Jun-1922	Trondheim	Sør-Trøndelag	Seamstress	25-Nov-1942	24-Feb-1943	Gotenland	3-Mar-1943	20	Auschwitz	
Dvoretsky	Marie	14-Jul-1891	Trondheim	Sør-Trøndelag	Homemaker	25-Nov-1942	24-Feb-1943	Gotenland	3-Mar-1943	51	Auschwitz	
Dvoretsky	Meyer	21-Feb-1894	Brønnøysund	Nordland	Merchant	18-Jun-1941	26-Nov-1942	Monte Rosa		48	Aurelind	
Dvoretsky	Sigurd	9-Oct-1920	Trondheim	Sør-Trøndelag	Office clerk	7-Oct-1942	24-Feb-1943	Gotenland	7-Jan-1944	23	Auschwitz	105266
Dworsky	Arvid	4-Mar-1923	Oslo	Oslo	Handyman	27-Oct-1942	26-Nov-1942	Donau	24-Jan-1943	19	Auschwitz	
Dworsky	Asbjørn	10-Dec-1920	Oslo	Oslo	Warehouse worker	27-Oct-1942	26-Nov-1942	Donau	24-Feb-1943	22	Auschwitz	79098
Dworsky	David	18-Mar-1886	Trondheim	Sør-Trøndelag	Dentist	7-Oct-1942	24-Feb-1943	Gotenland	3-Mar-1943	56	Auschwitz	
Dworsky	Käthe	30-Nov-1902	Trondheim	Sør-Trøndelag	Fashion draftsman	25-Nov-1942	24-Feb-1943	Gotenland	3-Mar-1943	40	Auschwitz	
Dworsky	Rebecca	14-Aug-1890	Oslo	Oslo	Retail clerk	26-Nov-1942	26-Nov-1942	Donau	1-Dec-1942	52	Auschwitz	
Dworsky	Rosa	15-Jul-1891	Oslo	Oslo	Homemaker	26-Nov-1942	26-Nov-1942	Donau	1-Dec-1942	51	Auschwitz	
Dworsky	Samuel	14-Oct-1889	Oslo	Oslo	Retail clerk	27-Oct-1942	26-Nov-1942	Donau	Dec 42	53	Auschwitz	
Dworsky	Selig	4-Apr-1895	Trondheim	Sør-Trøndelag	Retail clerk	7-Oct-1942	24-Feb-1943	Gotenland	3-Mar-1943	47	Auschwitz	
Dworsky	Taube	22-Oct-1919	Oslo	Oslo	Retail clerk	26-Nov-1942	26-Nov-1942	Donau	1-Dec-1942	23	Auschwitz	
Ebstein	Elias	18-May-1887	Oslo	Oslo	Merchant	27-Oct-1942	26-Nov-1942	Donau	1-Dec-1942	55	Auschwitz	
Ebstein	Josef	1-Aug-1927	Oslo	Oslo	Pupil	26-Nov-1942	26-Nov-1942	Donau	5-Jan-1943	15	Auschwitz	79103
Egelstein	Abraham	27-May-1891	Oslo	Oslo	Machine operator	27-Oct-1942	26-Nov-1942	Donau	1-Dec-1942	51	Auschwitz	
Egelstein	Borghild	22-Sep-1921	Oslo	Oslo	Special education teacher	26-Nov-1942	26-Nov-1942	Donau	1-Dec-1942	21	Auschwitz	
Egelstein	Sonja Sara	17-Jul-1894	Oslo	Oslo	Homemaker	26-Nov-1942	26-Nov-1942	Donau	1-Dec-1942	48	Auschwitz	
Eidenbom	Julius	27-Mar-1871	Bergen	Hordaland	Merchant	26-Nov-1942	24-Feb-1943	Gotenland	3-Mar-1943	71	Auschwitz	
Einziger	Walter	25-Sep-1905	Oppegård	Akershus	Office clerk	27-Oct-1942	26-Nov-1942	Donau	1-Dec-1942	37	Auschwitz	
Eiris	Jacob	20-Jan-1920	Oslo	Oslo	Worker	27-Oct-1942	26-Nov-1942	Donau	11-Jan-1943	22	Auschwitz	79106
Eiris	Sonja Sofie	20-Jul-1916	Oslo	Oslo	Seamstress	26-Nov-1942	26-Nov-1942	Donau	1-Dec-1942	26	Auschwitz	
Eisen	Leon	28-Nov-1897	Oslo	Oslo	Chemical engineer	27-Oct-1942	26-Nov-1942	Donau	1-Dec-1942	45	Auschwitz	
**Eisler**	**Otto**	1-Jun-1893	Oslo	Oslo	Architect	27-Oct-1942	21-Aug-1943	Other route	Survived			
**Eitinger**	**Leo**	21-Dec-1912	Nesjestranda in Molde	Møre og Romsdal	Physician	16-Mar-1942	24-Feb-1943	Gotenland	Survived			105268
Elias	Carl Ludwig	19-Sep-1891	Lillehammer	Oppland	Dr.juris	27-Oct-1942	26-Nov-1942	Donau	1-Dec-1942	51	Auschwitz	
**Epstein**	**Berthold**	1-Apr-1897	Oslo	Oslo	Physician	27-Oct-1942	26-Nov-1942	Donau	Survived			79104
Epstein	Othilie	8-Feb-1895	Oslo	Oslo	Homemaker	26-Nov-1942	26-Nov-1942	Donau	1-Dec-1942	47	Auschwitz	
Falck-Ytter	Bertha	6-Oct-1904	Oslo	Oslo	Musician	26-Nov-1942	26-Nov-1942	Donau	1-Dec-1942	38	Auschwitz	
Feidelmann	Abraham	13-Apr-1895	Mosjøen	Nordland	Municipal worker	27-Oct-1942	26-Nov-1942	Donau	1-Dec-1942	47	Auschwitz	
Fein	Isak Jacob	24-May-1882	Oslo	Oslo	Merchant	2-Dec-1942	24-Feb-1943	Gotenland	3-Mar-1943	60	Auschwitz	
Fein	Julius	15-May-1885	Stavanger	Rogaland	Merchant	26-Oct-1942	26-Nov-1942	Donau	Feb 43	57	Auschwitz	
Fein	Nathan	14-Apr-1887	Oslo	Oslo	Retail clerk	2-Sep-1942	20-Nov-1942	Monte Rosa	15-Mar-1945	57	Shot during transport to Buchenwald	
Fein	Rosi (Rosl)	5-Nov-1892	Stavanger	Rogaland	Homemaker	26-Nov-1942	24-Feb-1943	Gotenland	3-Mar-1943	50	Auschwitz	
Feinberg	Anna Sara	2-Feb-1872	Oslo	Oslo	Homemaker	26-Nov-1942	26-Nov-1942	Donau	1-Dec-1942	70	Auschwitz	
Feinberg	Clara	10-Sep-1885	Oslo	Oslo	Homemaker	26-Nov-1942	26-Nov-1942	Donau	1-Dec-1942	57	Auschwitz	
Feinberg	Elias	7-Sep-1894	Oslo	Oslo	Wholesaler	26-Nov-1942	26-Nov-1942	Donau	7-Jan-1943	48	Auschwitz	
Feinberg	Hermann	29-Jun-1901	Oslo	Oslo	Auditor	26-Oct-1942	26-Nov-1942	Donau	15-Jan-1943	41	Auschwift	79111
**Feinberg**	**Kai**	23-Dec-1921	Oslo	Oslo	Student	27-Oct-1942	26-Nov-1942	Donau	Survived			79108
Feinberg	Martin	16-Feb-1899	Oslo	Oslo	Retail clerk	27-Oct-1942	26-Nov-1942	Donau	4-Feb-1943	43	Auschwitz	79110
Feinberg	Rachel	6-Jun-1923	Oslo	Oslo	High school student	26-Nov-1942	26-Nov-1942	Donau	1-Dec-1942	19	Auschwitz	
Feldmann	Hermann	1-Mar-1918	Oslo	Oslo	Retail clerk	26-Oct-1942	24-Feb-1943	Gotenland	20-Aug-1943	25	Auschwitz	105273
Filländer	Abraham	12-Mar-1879	Oslo	Oslo	Merchant	5-Sep-1941	17-Dec-1941	Other route	27-Jan-1942	62	Sachsenhausen	
Fischel	Emanuel	5-Mar-1870	Oslo	Oslo	Factory owner	26-Oct-1942	26-Nov-1942	Donau	1-Dec-1942	72	Auschwitz	
Fischel	Erwin	7-Aug-1874	Oslo	Oslo	Physician	26-Oct-1942	26-Nov-1942	Donau	1-Dec-1942	68	Auschwitz	
Fischel	Grete	6-Jul-1911	Oslo	Oslo	Transient	26-Nov-1942	26-Nov-1942	Donau	1-Dec-1942	31	Auschwitz	
Fischel	Hans	2-Mar-1919	Oslo	Oslo	Office clerk	26-Oct-1942	26-Nov-1942	Donau	15-Feb-1943	23	Auschwitz	79107
Fischel	Lisel	17-Feb-1889	Oslo	Oslo	Homemaker	26-Nov-1942	26-Nov-1942	Donau	1-Dec-1942	53	Auschwitz	
Fischer	Bertha	4-Jun-1897	Narvik	Nordland	Homemaker	26-Nov-1942	24-Feb-1943	Gotenland	3-Mar-1943	45	Auschwitz	
Fischer	David	20-Jun-1899	Narvik	Nordland	Factory owner	26-Oct-1942	26-Nov-1942	Donau	1-Dec-1942	43	Auschwitz	
Fischer	Dina	15-Aug-1872	Trondheim	Sør-Trøndelag	Homemaker	25-Nov-1942	24-Feb-1943	Gotenland	3-Mar-1943	70	Auschwitz	
Fischer	Emanuel	30-Oct-1923	Kristiansund	Møre og Romsdal	Retail clerk	26-Oct-1942	26-Nov-1942	Donau	8-Feb-1943	19	Auschwitz	
Fischer	Eva	1-Apr-1905	Trondheim	Sør-Trøndelag	Homemaker	25-Nov-1942	24-Feb-1943	Gotenland	3-Mar-1943	37	Auschwitz	
Fischer	Gusta	29-Dec-1893	Kristiansund	Møre og Romsdal	Homemaker	26-Nov-1942	24-Feb-1943	Gotenland	3-Mar-1943	49	Auschwitz	
Fischer	Hermann	1-Jan-1893	Kristiansund	Møre og Romsdal	Factory owner	26-Oct-1942	26-Nov-1942	Monte Rosa	2-Jan-1943	49	Auschwitz	81968
Fischer	Idar	12-May-1931	Narvik	Nordland	Pupil	26-Oct-1942	24-Feb-1943	Gotenland	24-Mar-1943	11	Auschwitz	
Fischer	Judith	10-Jun-1930	Kristiansund	Møre og Romsdal	Pupil	26-Nov-1942	24-Feb-1943	Gotenland	3-Mar-1943	12	Auschwitz	
Fischer	Lilian	1-May-1928	Narvik	Nordland	Pupil	26-Nov-1942	24-Feb-1943	Gotenland	3-Mar-1943	14	Auschwitz	
Fischer	Martin	22-Apr-1895	Narvik	Nordland	Merchant	18-Jun-1941	26-Nov-1942	Monte Rosa	5-Jan-1943	47	Auschwitz	81957
Fischer	Ruth	18-Dec-1931	Kristiansund	Møre og Romsdal	Pupil	26-Nov-1942	24-Feb-1943	Gotenland	3-Mar-1943	11	Auschwitz	
Fischer	Samuel	5-Oct-1907	Narvik	Nordland	Bookkeeper	26-Oct-1942	26-Nov-1942	Donau	12-Jan-1943	35	Auschwitz	79117
Fischer	Theodor	15-Jan-1937	Kristiansund	Møre og Romsdal	Child	26-Nov-1942	24-Feb-1943	Gotenland	3-Mar-1943	6	Auschwitz	
Fischer	Wulf	13-Feb-1922	Narvik	Nordland	Farmer	26-Nov-1942	26-Nov-1942	Donau	1-Mar-1943	21	Auschwitz	79116
Flanter	Salo	9-Nov-1885	Oslo	Oslo		26-Oct-1942	26-Nov-1942	Donau	1-Dec-1942	57	Auschwitz	
Florence	Solveig	28-Jan-1904	Bærum	Akershus	Entrepreneur	26-Nov-1942	26-Nov-1942	Donau	1-Dec-1942	38	Auschwitz	
**Fraenkl**	**Pavel**	20-May-1904	Oslo	Oslo	Dr. philos	4-Aug-1942	29-Jan-1944	Other route	Survived			
Freidmann	Bernhard Meyer	30-Sep-1887	Oslo	Oslo	Sausage maker	27-Oct-1942	26-Nov-1942	Donau		55	Auschwitz	79112
Fridmann	Benjamin	8-Aug-1896	Oslo	Oslo	Merchant	26-Oct-1942	26-Nov-1942	Donau	2-Jan-1943	46	Auschwitz	79119
Fridmann	Ruben	15-Apr-1898	Oslo	Oslo	Worker	23-Apr-1942	21-Aug-1943	Other route		45	Auschwitz	
Fried	Abraham	17-May-1880	Oslo	Oslo	Cantor/ teacher	26-Oct-1942	24-Feb-1943	Gotenland	3-Mar-1943	62	Auschwitz	
Ganz	Charles	29-Apr-1932	Oslo	Oslo	Pupil	26-Nov-1942	26-Nov-1942	Donau	1-Dec-1942	10	Auschwitz	
Ganz	Fanny	12-Dec-1935	Oslo	Oslo	Pupil	26-Nov-1942	26-Nov-1942	Donau	1-Dec-1942	6	Auschwitz	
Ganz	Lea	7-Feb-1903	Oslo	Oslo	Homemaker	26-Nov-1942	26-Nov-1942	Donau	1-Dec-1942	39	Auschwitz	
Ganz	Marie	14-Nov-1868	Oslo	Oslo	Homemaker	26-Nov-1942	24-Feb-1943	Gotenland	3-Mar-1943	74	Auschwitz	
Garmi	Benjamin	15-Jul-1918	Oslo	Oslo	Furrier apprentice	26-Oct-1942	26-Nov-1942	Donau	Dec 43	25	Auschwitz	79124
Garmi	Gideon	25-Oct-1921	Oslo	Oslo	Furrier	26-Oct-1942	26-Nov-1942	Donau	15-Feb-1943	21	Auschwitz	
Gedanken	Bjørn	17-May-1925	Oslo	Oslo	Pupil	26-Oct-1942	26-Nov-1942	Donau	1-Dec-1942	17	Auschwitz	
Gedanken	Heimann	12-May-1922	Oslo	Oslo	Apprentice	26-Oct-1942	26-Nov-1942	Donau	1-Dec-1942	20	Auschwitz	
Gedanken	Josef	9-Nov-1893	Oslo	Oslo	Weaver	26-Oct-1942	24-Feb-1943	Gotenland	3-Mar-1943	49	Auschwitz	
Gedanken	Lilly	22-Jan-1916	Oslo	Oslo	Retail clerk	26-Nov-1942	26-Nov-1942	Donau	1-Dec-1942	26	Auschwitz	
Gedanken	Lina	15-Apr-1895	Oslo	Oslo	Homemaker	26-Nov-1942	26-Nov-1942	Donau	1-Dec-1942	47	Auschwitz	
Gettler	Hendrik	1-Dec-1916	Oslo	Oslo	Truck driver	22-Oct-1942	24-Feb-1943	Gotenland		26	Auschwitz	105281
Gettler	Herman	26-Mar-1885	Oslo	Oslo	Roofer	22-Oct-1942	24-Feb-1943	Gotenland	3-Mar-1943	57	Auschwitz	
Gettler	Marie	28-Apr-1889	Oslo	Oslo	Seamstress	26-Nov-1942	26-Nov-1942	Donau	1-Dec-1942	53	Auschwitz	
Gettler	Sonja	13-Mar-1910	Oslo	Oslo	Seamstress	22-Oct-1942	26-Nov-1942	Donau	1-Dec-1942	32	Auschwitz	
Gettler	Svend	21-Dec-1912	Oslo	Oslo	Roofer	22-Oct-1942	24-Feb-1943	Gotenland	1-May-1943	30	Auschwitz	
Gittelsen	Israel Jakob	9-Sep-1877	Oslo	Oslo	Watchmaker	26-Oct-1942	26-Nov-1942	Donau	1-Dec-1942	65	Auschwitz	
Gittelsen	Lea	18-May-1872	Oslo	Oslo	Homemaker	26-Nov-1942	26-Nov-1942	Donau	1-Dec-1942	70	Auschwitz	
Gittelsen	Signe	10-Nov-1903	Oslo	Oslo	Office clerk	26-Nov-1942	26-Nov-1942	Donau	1-Dec-1942	39	Auschwitz	
Glick	David	4-Oct-1907	Sunndalsøra	Møre og Romsdal	Transport worker	27-Oct-1942	26-Nov-1942	Donau	22-Jan-1943	35	Auschwitz	79127
Glick	Isak	23-Apr-1915	Ås	Akershus	Chemical engineer	26-Oct-1942	26-Nov-1942	Donau	19-Jan-1943	27	Auschwitz	
Glick	Jenny	2-Oct-1874	Oslo	Oslo	Homemaker	26-Nov-1942	26-Nov-1942	Donau	1-Dec-1942	68	Auschwitz	
Glick	Rakel	17-Nov-1882	Trondheim	Sør-Trøndelag	Factory owner	26-Nov-1942	24-Feb-1943	Gotenland	3-Mar-1943	60	Auschwitz	
Glickman	David	5-Jan-1921	Oslo	Oslo	Hair stylist	26-Oct-1942	26-Nov-1942	Donau	24-Feb-1943	22	Auschwitz	
Glickmann	Sara	27-Feb-1920	Oslo	Oslo	Homemaker	26-Nov-1942	26-Nov-1942	Donau	1-Dec-1942	22	Auschwitz	
Goldberg	Alexander	7-Mar-1905	Oslo	Oslo	Businessman	2-Sep-1942	20-Nov-1942	Monte Rosa	15-Jan-1943	37	Auschwitz	
Goldberg	Anna	29-Oct-1879	Oslo	Oslo	Homemaker	26-Nov-1942	26-Nov-1942	Donau	1-Dec-1942	63	Auschwitz	
Goldberg	David	19-Aug-1879	Oslo	Oslo	Merchant	2-Sep-1942	20-Nov-1942	Monte Rosa	1-Dec-1942	63	Auschwitz	
Goldberg	Gustav	28-Mar-1917	Oslo	Oslo	Apprentice	26-Oct-1942	26-Nov-1942	Donau	24-Dec-1942	25	Auschwitz	79126
Goldberg	Marie	2-Dec-1903	Oslo	Oslo	Retail clerk	26-Nov-1942	26-Nov-1942	Donau	1-Dec-1942	38	Auschwitz	
Goldenheim	Rebekka	24-Aug-1883	Oslo	Oslo	Music teacher	26-Nov-1942	26-Nov-1942	Donau	1-Dec-1942	59	Auschwitz	
Goldmann	Isak Meyer	27-Aug-1883	Hammerfest	Finnmark	Merchant	26-Oct-1942	26-Nov-1942	Donau	1-Dec-1942	59	Auschwitz	
Goldwasser	Abel	28-May-1927	Oslo	Oslo	Pupil	26-Nov-1942	26-Nov-1942	Donau	1-Dec-1942	15	Auschwitz	
Goldwasser	Sigmund	12-Jun-1923	Oslo	Oslo	Pupil	26-Nov-1942	26-Nov-1942	Donau	1-Dec-1942	19	Auschwitz	
Goldwasser	Simon	27-Apr-1890	Oslo	Oslo	Tanner	26-Oct-1942	26-Nov-1942	Donau	Jan 43	52	Auschwitz	87542
Gordon	Arne	14-Mar-1928	Oslo	Oslo	Pupil	26-Nov-1942	26-Nov-1942	Donau	1-Dec-1942	14	Auschwitz	
Gordon	Bernhard	22-Nov-1905	Oslo	Oslo	Merchant	26-Oct-1942	26-Nov-1942	Donau		37	Auschwitz	
Gordon	Doris	13-Oct-1934	Oslo	Oslo	Pupil	26-Nov-1942	26-Nov-1942	Donau	1-Dec-1942	8	Auschwitz	
Gordon	Edith	8-Nov-1901	Oslo	Oslo	Businesswoman	26-Nov-1942	26-Nov-1942	Donau	1-Dec-1942	41	Auschwitz	
Gordon	Leo	9-Oct-1932	Oslo	Oslo	Pupil	26-Nov-1942	26-Nov-1942	Donau	1-Dec-1942	10	Auschwitz	
Gorvitz	Adolf	5-Jul-1884	Oslo	Oslo	Roofer	27-Oct-1942	26-Nov-1942	Donau	1-Dec-1942	58	Auschwitz	
Gorvitz	Bjarne	5-Jul-1925	Oslo	Oslo	Roofer	26-Oct-1942	26-Nov-1942	Donau		17	Auschwitz	79122
Gorvitz	David	3-Jul-1919	Oslo	Oslo	Roofer	7-Sep-1941	20-Nov-1942	Monte Rosa	8-Feb-1943	23	Auschwitz	80040
Gorvitz	Elias	7-Sep-1911	Oslo	Oslo	Roofer	26-Oct-1942	26-Nov-1942	Donau	17-Apr-1943	31	Auschwitz	79123
Gorvitz	Ester	10-Jan-1923	Oslo	Oslo	Seamstress	26-Nov-1942	26-Nov-1942	Donau	1-Dec-1942	19	Auschwitz	
Gorvitz	Herman	27-Apr-1922	Oslo	Oslo	Roofer	26-Oct-1942	26-Nov-1942	Donau		20	Auschwitz	79120
Gorvitz	Leopold	29-Jun-1915	Oslo	Oslo	Roofer	26-Oct-1942	26-Nov-1942	Donau	Mar 43	27	Auschwitz	79121
Gorvitz	Lina	27-May-1887	Oslo	Oslo	Homemaker	26-Nov-1942	26-Nov-1942	Donau	1-Dec-1942	55	Auschwitz	
Gorwitz	Edel	9-Sep-1928	Oslo	Oslo	Pupil	26-Nov-1942	26-Nov-1942	Donau	1-Dec-1942	14	Auschwitz	
Gorwitz	Esther	10-Jan-1923	Oslo	Oslo	Seamstress	26-Nov-1942	26-Nov-1942	Donau	1-Dec-1942	19	Auschwitz	
Gorwitz	Ida	23-May-1916	Oslo	Oslo	Office clerk	26-Nov-1942	26-Nov-1942	Donau	1-Dec-1942	26	Auschwitz	
Gosias	Philipp	30-Mar-1883	Oslo	Oslo	Businessman	28-Oct-1942	24-Feb-1943	Gotenland	3-Mar-1943	59	Auschwitz	
Grabowski	Josef	11-May-1911	Trondheim	Sør-Trøndelag	Cantor	7-Oct-1942	24-Feb-1943	Gotenland	May 43	31	Auschwitz	105359
Grabowski	Liesebeth	30-Apr-1920	Trondheim	Sør-Trøndelag	Homemaker	25-Nov-1942	24-Feb-1943	Gotenland	3-Mar-1943	22	Auschwitz	
Graf	Tibor	25-Sep-1908	Oslo	Oslo	University tutor	20-Apr-1943	30-Sep-1943	Other route		35	Auschwitz	
Granstein	Sara	20-May-1894	Kristiansund	Møre og Romsdal	Homemaker	26-Nov-1942	24-Feb-1943	Gotenland	3-Mar-1943	48	Auschwitz	
Gross	Israel	10-Jul-1878	Oslo	Oslo	Factory owner	26-Oct-1942	26-Nov-1942	Donau	1-Dec-1942	64	Auschwitz	
Gruder	Felix	26-Sep-1904	Oslo	Oslo	Engineer	26-Oct-1942	26-Nov-1942	Donau		38	Auschwitz	
Grün	Helga	24-Jun-1892	Oslo	Oslo	Translator	26-Nov-1942	26-Nov-1942	Donau	1-Dec-1942	50	Auschwitz	
Gunst	Emil	21-Oct-1891	Oppegård	Akershus		26-Oct-1942	24-Feb-1943	Gotenland	3-Mar-1943	51	Auschwitz	
Gunst	Gjertrud	15-Oct-1930	Oppegård	Akershus	Pupil	26-Nov-1942	26-Nov-1942	Donau	1-Dec-1942	12	Auschwitz	
Gunst	Lilly	8-Oct-1911	Oppegård	Akershus	Homemaker	26-Nov-1942	26-Nov-1942	Donau	1-Dec-1942	31	Auschwitz	
Gurewitz	Josef	15-Apr-1905	Trondheim	Sør-Trøndelag	Retail clerk	26-Oct-1942	24-Feb-1943	Gotenland		37	Auschwitz	
Gurewitz	Klara	13-Sep-1900	Trondheim	Sør-Trøndelag	Retail clerk	26-Nov-1942	24-Feb-1943	Gotenland	3-Mar-1943	42	Auschwitz	
Gurewitz	Michael	31-Dec-1908	Trondheim	Sør-Trøndelag	Worker	26-Oct-1942	24-Feb-1943	Gotenland		34	Auschwitz	
Hammerschlag	Friedrich	20-Nov-1888	Halden	Østfold		26-Oct-1942	24-Feb-1943	Gotenland	3-Mar-1943	54	Auschwitz	
Hammerschlag	Toni Sara	10-Dec-1896	Halden	Østfold	Homemaker	26-Nov-1942	24-Feb-1943	Gotenland	3-Mar-1943	46	Auschwitz	
Hanauer	Clothilde	29-Nov-1882	Ålvik in Hardanger	Hordaland	Homemaker	26-Nov-1942	24-Feb-1943	Gotenland	2-Mar-1943	60	Auschwitz	
Heilbuth	Julius	10-Apr-1863	Oslo	Oslo		26-Oct-1942	26-Nov-1942	Donau	1-Dec-1942	79	Auschwitz	
Heilbuth	Rosalie	22-Sep-1868	Oslo	Oslo	Homemaker	26-Nov-1942	26-Nov-1942	Donau	1-Dec-1942	74	Auschwitz	
**Hirsch**	**Asriel-Berl ("Pelle")**	4-Apr-1920	Trondheim	Sør-Trøndelag	Student	7-Oct-1942	24-Feb-1943	Gotenland	Survived			105302
**Hirsch**	**Assor**	9-Apr-1923	Trondheim	Sør-Trøndelag	Student	8-Oct-1942	24-Feb-1943	Gotenland	Survived			105303
Hirsch	Chaim	8-Sep-1879	Trondheim	Sør-Trøndelag	Businessman	8-Oct-1942	24-Feb-1943	Gotenland	3-Mar-1943	63	Auschwitz	
Hirsch	Chaja	20-Dec-1912	Trondheim	Sør-Trøndelag	Retail clerk	25-Nov-1942	24-Feb-1943	Gotenland	3-Mar-1943	30	Auschwitz	
Hirsch	Esther	26-May-1905	Kristiansund	Møre og Romsdal	Homemaker	26-Nov-1942	24-Feb-1943	Gotenland	3-Mar-1942	36	Auschwitz	
Hirsch	Frida	18-Dec-1868	Kristiansund	Møre og Romsdal	Homemaker	26-Nov-1942	24-Feb-1943	Gotenland	3-Mar-1943	74	Auschwitz	
Hirsch	Gittel	27-Mar-1909	Trondheim	Sør-Trøndelag	Retail clerk	25-Nov-1942	24-Feb-1943	Gotenland	3-Mar-1943	33	Auschwitz	
Hirsch	Jakob	20-May-1866	Kristiansund	Møre og Romsdal	Merchant	26-Oct-1942	24-Feb-1943	Gotenland	3-Mar-1943	76	Auschwitz	
Hirsch	Leon	9-Jan-1908	Trondheim	Sør-Trøndelag	Gardener	7-Oct-1942	24-Feb-1943	Gotenland	16-Dec-1943	35	Auschwitz	105304
Hirsch	Liv	21-Apr-1922	Oslo	Oslo	Office clerk	26-Nov-1942	26-Nov-1942	Donau	1-Dec-1942	20	Auschwitz	
Hirsch	Marie	7-Jul-1887	Trondheim	Sør-Trøndelag	Homemaker	25-Nov-1942	24-Feb-1943	Gotenland	3-Mar-1943	55	Auschwitz	
Hirsch	Ruben	20-Aug-1914	Trondheim	Sør-Trøndelag	Musician	8-Oct-1942	24-Feb-1943	Gotenland	21-Jan-1944	29	Auschwitz	105305
Hirsch	Stephanie	10-Oct-1875	Lillehammer	Oppland	Homemaker	26-Nov-1942	26-Nov-1942	Donau	1-Dec-1942	67	Auschwitz	
Hirsch	Wolf	30-Jul-1897	Kristiansund	Møre og Romsdal	Businessman	26-Oct-1942	26-Nov-1942	Donau		45	Auschwitz	
Hirschberg	Meta Toni	4-May-1865	Oslo	Oslo	Homemaker	26-Nov-1942	26-Nov-1942	Donau	1-Dec-1942	77	Auschwitz	
Hirschfeld	Taube	2-May-1883	Oslo	Oslo	Physician	26-Nov-1942	26-Nov-1942	Donau	1-Dec-1942	59	Auschwitz	
Hurwitz	Anna	30-May-1890	Oslo	Oslo	Homemaker	8-Dec-1942	24-Feb-1943	Gotenland	3-Mar-1943	52	Auschwitz	
Hurwitz	Arvid	30-Jan-1922	Oslo	Oslo	Electrical installer	23-Jun-1941	26-Nov-1942	Donau	1-Jan-1944	21	Auschwitz	
Hurwitz	Benno	22-Apr-1932	Oslo	Oslo	Pupil	26-Oct-1942	26-Nov-1942	Donau	1-Dec-1942	10	Auschwitz	
Hurwitz	Bernhard	25-Jul-1877	Oslo	Oslo	Buyer	26-Oct-1942	26-Nov-1942	Donau	1-Dec-1942	65	Auschwitz	
Hurwitz	Fredrik	18-Oct-1928	Oslo	Oslo	Pupil	26-Oct-1942	26-Nov-1942	Donau	1-Dec-1942	14	Auschwitz	
Hurwitz	Gabriel	24-Aug-1889	Oslo	Oslo	Transient	26-Oct-1942	26-Nov-1942	Donau	1-Dec-1942	53	Auschwitz	
Hurwitz	Jakob	7-Feb-1916	Oslo	Oslo	Chauffeur	26-Oct-1942	26-Nov-1942	Donau	23-Feb-1943	27	Auschwitz	79132
Hurwitz	Jenny	10-Jan-1907	Oslo	Oslo	Retail clerk	26-Nov-1942	26-Nov-1942	Donau	1-Dec-1942	35	Auschwitz	
Hurwitz	Jenny	2-Dec-1922	Oslo	Oslo	Retail clerk	26-Nov-1942	26-Nov-1942	Donau	1-Dec-1942	19	Auschwitz	
Hurwitz	Josef	31-May-1920	Oslo	Oslo	Mechanic	26-Oct-1942	26-Nov-1942	Donau	1-Jan-1944	23	Auschwitz	
Hurwitz	Klara	20-Dec-1880	Oslo	Oslo	Homemaker	26-Nov-1942	26-Nov-1942	Donau	1-Dec-1942	61	Auschwitz	
Hurwitz	Marie	7-Dec-1911	Oslo	Oslo	Homemaker	26-Nov-1942	26-Nov-1942	Donau	1-Dec-1942	30	Auschwitz	
Hurwitz	Markus	15-Oct-1898	Oslo	Oslo	Tobacco worker	25-Aug-1942	24-Feb-1943	Gotenland	Mar 43	44	Auschwitz	
Hurwitz	Meier	28-Jan-1916	Oslo	Oslo	Retail clerk	26-Oct-1942	26-Nov-1942	Donau	Mar 43	27	Auschwitz	
Hurwitz	Salemon	10-Aug-1910	Oslo	Oslo	Factory owner	26-Oct-1942	26-Nov-1942	Donau	Mar 43	32	Auschwitz	
Hurwitz	Therese	3-Oct-1899	Oslo	Oslo	Homemaker	26-Nov-1942	26-Nov-1942	Donau	1-Dec-1942	43	Auschwitz	
Huszar	Hans Paul	31-Jul-1914	Bergen	Hordaland	Draftsman	26-Nov-1942	26-Nov-1942	Donau	16-Jan-1943	28	Auschwitz	
Isachsen	Benjamin	23-Apr-1905	Sørumsand	Akershus	Farm hand	8-Nov-1942	26-Nov-1942	Donau	15-Jan-1943	37	Auschwitz	
Isaksen	Aron	13-Sep-1905	Oslo	Oslo	Bookkeeper	26-Nov-1942	26-Nov-1942	Donau	1-Dec-1942	37	Auschwitz	
Isaksen	Gittel Gerd	25-Aug-1925	Trondheim	Sør-Trøndelag	Pupil	26-Nov-1942	24-Feb-1943	Gotenland	3-Mar-1943	17	Auschwitz	
Isaksen	Harry Samuel	6-Jul-1932	Trondheim	Sør-Trøndelag	Pupil	26-Nov-1942	24-Feb-1943	Gotenland	3-Mar-1943	10	Auschwitz	
Isaksen	Hermann	4-Jun-1908	Oslo	Oslo	Tailor	26-Oct-1942	26-Nov-1942	Donau	4-Mar-1943	34	Auschwitz	79136
Isaksen	Isak Leiser	15-Aug-1875	Oslo	Oslo	Tailor	26-Oct-1942	26-Nov-1942	Donau	1-Dec-1942	67	Auschwitz	
Isaksen	Isidor	2-Nov-1896	Trondheim	Sør-Trøndelag	Merchant	28-Jul-1942	26-Nov-1942	Monte Rosa	9-Apr-1943	46	Auschwitz	81972
Isaksen	Leonhard	11-Nov-1928	Trondheim	Sør-Trøndelag	Pupil	26-Nov-1942	24-Feb-1943	Gotenland	3-Mar-1943	14	Auschwitz	
Isaksen	Rebekka Sonja	25-Sep-1885	Oslo	Oslo	Homemaker	26-Nov-1942	26-Nov-1942	Donau	1-Dec-1942	57	Auschwitz	
Isaksen	Rosa	7-Jul-1896	Trondheim	Sør-Trøndelag	Homemaker	26-Nov-1942	24-Feb-1943	Gotenland	3-Mar-1943	46	Auschwitz	
Iskin	Awschey	15-Dec-1877	Oslo	Oslo	Furrier	27-Oct-1942	26-Nov-1942	Donau	1-Dec-1942	64	Auschwitz	
Jacobowitz	Lewek	3-Apr-1888	Oslo	Oslo	Merchant	22-Jan-1941		Other route	19-Jul-1943	55	Auschwitz	
Jaffe	Arnold	3-Jan-1927	Gjøvik	Oppland	Pupil	26-Nov-1942	26-Nov-1942	Donau	1-Dec-1942	15	Auschwitz	
Jaffe	Cecilie	8-Feb-1911	Oslo	Oslo	Maid	26-Nov-1942	26-Nov-1942	Donau	1-Dec-1942	31	Auschwitz	
Jaffe	Esther	20-Feb-1888	Oslo	Oslo	Retail clerk	26-Nov-1942	26-Nov-1942	Donau	1-Dec-1942	54	Auschwitz	
Jaffe	Esther Emy	17-Nov-1883	Tønsberg	Vestfold	Homemaker	26-Nov-1942	26-Nov-1942	Donau	1-Dec-1942	59	Auschwitz	
Jaffe	Eva	22-Aug-1919	Tønsberg	Vestfold	Retail clerk	26-Nov-1942	26-Nov-1942	Donau	1-Dec-1942	23	Auschwitz	
Jaffe	Gerhard	19-May-1905	Oslo	Oslo		26-Oct-1942	24-Feb-1943	Gotenland	4-Jun-1943	38	Auschwitz	
Jaffe	Hanna	18-Jul-1914	Oslo	Oslo	Typographer	26-Nov-1942	26-Nov-1942	Donau	1-Dec-1942	28	Auschwitz	
Jaffe	Ida	15-May-1912	Oslo	Oslo	Homemaker	26-Nov-1942	26-Nov-1942	Donau	1-Dec-1942	30	Auschwitz	
Jaffe	Isak	15-May-1882	Oslo	Oslo	Merchant	26-Oct-1942	26-Nov-1942	Donau	1-Dec-1942	60	Auschwitz	
Jaffe	Leopold	3-May-1892	Tønsberg	Vestfold	Manager	26-Nov-1942	26-Nov-1942	Donau		50	Auschwitz	
Jaffe	Markus	13-Dec-1861	Tønsberg	Vestfold	Merchant	26-Oct-1942	26-Nov-1942	Donau	1-Dec-1942	80	Auschwitz	
Jaffe	Mendel	5-Dec-1920	Gjøvik	Oppland	Photography apprentice	26-Oct-1942	26-Nov-1942	Donau		22	Auschwitz	
Jaffe	Moritz	25-Jun-1889	Halden	Østfold	Merchant	2-Nov-1942	20-Nov-1942	Monte Rosa		53	Auschwitz	
Jaffe	Rakel	22-Jan-1894	Tønsberg	Vestfold	Homemaker	26-Nov-1942	26-Nov-1942	Donau	1-Dec-1942	48	Auschwitz	
Jaffe	Robert	16-Apr-1924	Gjøvik	Oppland	High school student	26-Oct-1942	26-Nov-1942	Donau		18	Auschwitz	
Jaffe	Rudolf	27-May-1923	Tønsberg	Vestfold	Student	26-Oct-1942	26-Nov-1942	Donau	15-Jan-1943	19	Auschwitz	
Jaffe	Ruth	19-Jun-1897	Gjøvik	Oppland	Homemaker	26-Nov-1942	26-Nov-1942	Donau	1-Dec-1942	45	Auschwitz	
Jaffe	Samson	15-Dec-1887	Gjøvik	Oppland	Merchant	26-Oct-1942	26-Nov-1942	Donau	1-Dec-1942	54	Auschwitz	
Jakubowitz	Jenny	12-Jul-1935	Bærum	Akershus	Pupil	26-Nov-1942	26-Nov-1942	Donau	1-Dec-1942	7	Auschwitz	
Jakubowitz	Mina	25-Feb-1908	Bærum	Akershus	Homemaker	26-Nov-1942	26-Nov-1942	Donau	1-Dec-1942	34	Auschwitz	
Jakubowitz	Rudolf	5-Feb-1889	Bærum	Akershus	Businessman	26-Oct-1942	26-Nov-1942	Donau	1-Dec-1942	53	Auschwitz	
Jakubowitz	Simon	11-Mar-1933	Bærum	Akershus	Pupil	26-Nov-1942	26-Nov-1942	Donau	1-Dec-1942	9	Auschwitz	
Jakubowitz	Sonja Henny	14-Aug-1931	Bærum	Akershus	Pupil	26-Nov-1942	26-Nov-1942	Donau	1-Dec-1942	11	Auschwitz	
Jaroschy	Wilhelm	16-Apr-1886	Oslo	Oslo	Physician	26-Oct-1942	24-Feb-1943	Gotenland	3-Mar-1943	56	Auschwitz	
Jelaawitz	Esther	15-Apr-1886	Oslo	Oslo	Homemaker	26-Nov-1942	26-Nov-1942	Donau	1-Dec-1942	56	Auschwitz	
Jelaawitz	Fanny	5-Apr-1906	Oslo	Oslo	Retail clerk	26-Nov-1942	26-Nov-1942	Donau	1-Dec-1942	36	Auschwitz	
Jelaawitz	Isak Leib	15-Feb-1882	Oslo	Oslo	Businessman	26-Oct-1942	24-Feb-1943	Gotenland	3-Mar-1943	61	Auschwitz	
Jellineck	Hans	22-Dec-1906	Oslo	Oslo	Office clerk	26-Oct-1943	26-Nov-1942	Donau	14-Jan-1943	36	Auschwitz	
Jelo	David	23-May-1904	Oslo	Oslo	Businessman	26-Oct-1942	26-Nov-1942	Donau	12-Dec-1942	38	Auschwitz	
Jelo	Herman	1-Mar-1908	Oslo	Oslo	Hair stylist	26-Oct-1942	26-Nov-1942	Donau	2-Jan-1943	34	Auschwitz	
Jelowitz	Dora	3-Jul-1910	Oslo	Oslo	Retail clerk	26-Nov-1942	26-Nov-1942	Donau	1-Dec-1942	32	Auschwitz	
Johansen	Helene	19-Apr-1903	Oslo	Oslo	Secretary	22-Jun-1941	15-Nov-1941	Donau	May 42	39	Auschwitz	
Joseff	David	23-Apr-1893	Stavanger	Rogaland	Workshop manager	26-Oct-1942	26-Nov-1942	Donau	2-Jan-1943	49	Auschwitz	
Joseff	Hildur Sara	25-Jan-1916	Stavanger	Rogaland	Retail clerk	26-Nov-1942	24-Feb-1943	Gotenland	3-Mar-1943	27	Auschwitz	
Joseff	Selmer	13-Nov-1922	Stavanger	Rogaland	Rubber worker	26-Oct-1942	26-Nov-1942	Donau	Jan 43	20	Auschwitz	
Joseff	Sophie	1-Sep-1892	Stavanger	Rogaland	Homemaker	26-Nov-1942	24-Feb-1943	Gotenland	3-Mar-1943	50	Auschwitz	
Joseph	Cecilie	25-Jun-1897	Oslo	Oslo	Tobacco worker	26-Nov-1942	26-Nov-1942	Donau	1-Dec-1942	45	Auschwitz	
Joseph	Fanny	20-Dec-1874	Oslo	Oslo	Homemaker	26-Nov-1942	26-Nov-1942	Donau	1-Dec-1942	67	Auschwitz	
Joseph	Herman	25-Oct-1876	Åsnes	Hedmark	Retired merchant	26-Oct-1942	24-Feb-1943	Gotenland	3-Mar-1943	66	Auschwitz	
**Kahan**	**Moritz**	1-Feb-1916	Oslo	Oslo	Driver	23-Oct-1942	26-Nov-1942	Donau	Survive			
Kahn	Ada Ester	15-Oct-1938	Bærum	Akershus	Child	26-Nov-1942	26-Nov-1942	Donau	1-Dec-1942	4	Auschwitz	
Kahn	Cecilie	4-Feb-1900	Bærum	Akershus	Entrepreneur	26-Nov-1942	26-Nov-1942	Donau	1-Dec-1942	42	Auschwitz	
Kahn	Rosa	10-Apr-1876	Trondheim	Sør-Trøndelag	Factory owner	26-Nov-1942	24-Feb-1943	Gotenland	3-Mar-1943	66	Auschwitz	
Kaplan	Isak	14-Apr-1889	Oslo	Oslo	Tobacco worker	26-Oct-1942	26-Nov-1942	Donau	16-Jan-1943	53	Auschwitz	
Karpol	Esther	25-Dec-1903	Harpefoss	Oppland	Homemaker	26-Nov-1942	26-Nov-1942	Donau	1-Dec-1942	38	Auschwitz	
Karpol	Klara	25-Aug-1899	Oslo	Oslo	Office clerk	26-Nov-1942	26-Nov-1942	Donau	1-Dec-1942	43	Auschwitz	
Karpol	Samuel	7-Feb-1901	Harpefoss	Oppland	Farmer	26-Oct-1942	26-Nov-1942	Donau	13-Jan-1943	41	Auschwitz	
Kassan	Bassy	10-Jun-1912	Oslo	Oslo	Book binder	26-Nov-1942	26-Nov-1942	Donau	1-Dec-1942	30	Auschwitz	
Kassan	Cecilie	15-Mar-1878	Oslo	Oslo	Ironer	26-Nov-1942	26-Nov-1942	Donau	1-Dec-1942	64	Auschwitz	
Kassan	Max Martin	2-Apr-1909	Oslo	Oslo	Brewery worker	21-Aug-1942	24-Feb-1943	Gotenland	12-May-1943	34	Auschwitz	
Kassan	Mona Esther	10-Aug-1914	Oslo	Oslo	Typographer	26-Nov-1942	26-Nov-1942	Donau	1-Dec-1942	28	Auschwitz	
Katz	Moses	28-Oct-1874	Oslo	Oslo	Merchant	26-Oct-1942	26-Nov-1942	Donau	1-Dec-1942	68	Auschwitz	
Kazerginsky	Bertha	27-Jun-1867	Oslo	Oslo	Homemaker	26-Nov-1942	24-Feb-1943	Gotenland	3-Mar-1943	75	Auschwitz	
**Keil**	**Eugen**	4-Jun-1907	Hønefoss	Buskerud	Watchmaker	25-Oct-1942	22-May-1943	Other route	Survived			
Kermann	Anna	11-Oct-1919	Oslo	Oslo	Tobacco worker	26-Nov-1942	26-Nov-1942	Donau	1-Dec-1942	23	Auschwitz	
Kermann	Charles Abraham	5-Jul-1916	Oslo	Oslo	Presser	26-Oct-1942	26-Nov-1942	Donau	13-Jan-1943	26	Auschwitz	
Kermann	Gerda	2-Nov-1919	Oslo	Oslo	Seamstress	26-Nov-1942	26-Nov-1942	Donau	1-Dec-1942	23	Auschwitz	
Kermann	Isak	5-Aug-1885	Lillestrøm	Akershus	Amusement park worker	26-Oct-1942	26-Nov-1942	Donau	1-Dec-1942	57	Auschwitz	
Kermann	Markus	1-Jan-1891	Oslo	Oslo	Tailor	27-Oct-1942	26-Nov-1942	Donau	1-Dec-1942	51	Auschwitz	
Kermann	Moritz	10-Dec-1914	Oslo	Oslo	Presser	26-Oct-1942	26-Nov-1942	Donau	2-Mar-1943	28	Auschwitz	
Kermann	Olga	7-May-1892	Oslo	Oslo	Homemaker	26-Nov-1942	26-Nov-1942	Donau	1-Dec-1942	50	Auschwitz	
Kermann	Robert	25-Feb-1918	Oslo	Oslo	Disinfectant worker	26-Oct-1942	26-Nov-1942	Donau	15-Jan-1943	24	Auschwitz	
Kermann	Sara	10-May-1888	Oslo	Oslo	Homemaker	26-Nov-1942	26-Nov-1942	Donau	1-Dec-1942	54	Auschwitz	
Kerner	Jacob Isak	21-Jan-1896	Oslo	Oslo	Furniture merchant	26-Oct-1942	26-Nov-1942	Donau	1-Dec-1942	46	Auschwitz	
Kirschner	Carl Leopold	28-Aug-1865	Oslo	Oslo	Transient	26-Oct-1942	24-Feb-1943	Gotenland	3-Mar-1943	77	Auschwitz	
Klein	Abraham	12-Jun-1926	Trondheim	Sør-Trøndelag	High school student	7-Oct-1942	24-Feb-1943	Gotenland	3-Mar-1943	16	Auschwitz	
Klein	Cissi Pera	19-Apr-1929	Trondheim	Sør-Trøndelag	Pupil	25-Nov-1942	24-Feb-1943	Gotenland	3-Mar-1943	13	Auschwitz	
Klein	Moritz	29-Jan-1911	Tromsø	Troms	Merchant	18-Jun-1941	26-Nov-1942	Monte Rosa	17-Feb-1943	32	Auschwitz	81950
Klein	Wolf	5-Jun-1886	Trondheim	Sør-Trøndelag	Merchant	7-Oct-1942	24-Feb-1943	Gotenland	3-Mar-1943	56	Auschwitz	
Knøpfler	Ernst	30-Jun-1906	Kolbotn in Årdal	Sogn og Fjordane	Dairy worker	26-Oct-1942	26-Nov-1942	Donau		36	Auschwitz	79150
Knøpfler	Helene	9-Apr-1915	Kolbotn in Årdal	Sogn og Fjordane	Homemaker	26-Nov-1942	26-Nov-1942	Donau	1-Dec-1942	27	Auschwitz	
Knøpfler	Leopold	8-Apr-1935	Kolbotn in Årdal	Sogn og Fjordane	Pupil	26-Nov-1942	26-Nov-1942	Donau	1-Dec-1942	7	Auschwitz	
Knøpfler	Odd	2-May-1939	Kolbotn in Årdal	Sogn og Fjordane	Child	26-Nov-1942	26-Nov-1942	Donau	1-Dec-1942	3	Auschwitz	
Koklin	Benjamin	12-Oct-1891	Tønsberg	Vestfold	Businessman	26-Oct-1942	26-Nov-1942	Donau	Jan 43	51	Auschwitz	
Koklin	Emil Georg	17-Nov-1925	Tønsberg	Vestfold	Machine operator	26-Oct-1942	26-Nov-1942	Donau	Jan 43	17	Auschwitz	79153
Koklin	Ida	15-Jun-1887	Tønsberg	Vestfold	Homemaker	26-Nov-1942	26-Nov-1942	Donau	1-Dec-1942	55	Auschwitz	
Koklin	Julius	31-Jul-1922	Tønsberg	Vestfold	Student	26-Oct-1942	26-Nov-1942	Donau	14-Jan-1943	20	Auschwitz	79152
Kolnitzansky	Henrik	1-Nov-1919	Kristiansand	Vest-Agder	Machine operator	26-Oct-1942	26-Nov-1942	Donau	13-Jan-1943	23	Auschwitz	
Komnik	Beer	1-Apr-1927	Hurum	Buskerud	Pupil	26-Nov-1942	26-Nov-1942	Donau	Jan 43	15	Auschwitz	79161
Komnik	Jakob	23-Oct-1897	Hurum	Buskerud	Factory owner	26-Oct-1942	26-Nov-1942	Donau	Jan 43	45	Auschwitz	
Komnik	Julie	23-Dec-1898	Hurum	Buskerud	Homemaker	26-Nov-1942	26-Nov-1942	Donau	1-Dec-1942	43	Auschwitz	
Kraast	Adolf	18-Jan-1890	Oslo	Oslo	Painter	26-Oct-1942	26-Nov-1942	Donau	1-Dec-1942	52	Auschwitz	
Kraus	Eugen	12-Jan-1909	Oslo	Oslo	Salesman	26-Oct-1942	26-Nov-1942	Donau	Feb 43	34	Auschwitz	79149
Kreilisheim	Gisela (Ella)	10-Dec-1867	Oslo	Oslo	Homemaker	26-Nov-1942	26-Nov-1942	Donau	1-Dec-1942	74	Auschwitz	
Krieger	Jacob	1-Sep-1899	Oslo	Oslo		26-Oct-1942	26-Nov-1942	Donau		43	Auschwitz	
Krieger	Klara	27-Mar-1906	Oslo	Oslo	Homemaker	26-Nov-1942	26-Nov-1942	Donau	1-Dec-1942	36	Auschwitz	
Krimm	Jenny	21-Aug-1901	Oslo	Oslo	Retail clerk	26-Nov-1942	26-Nov-1942	Donau	1-Dec-1942	41	Auschwitz	
Kristiansen	Mirjam	26-Jun-1899	Oslo	Oslo	Secretary	22-Jun-1941	15-Nov-1941	Donau	May 42	42	Auschwitz	
Krømer	Frida	8-Apr-1902	Oslo	Oslo	Music teacher	26-Nov-1942	26-Nov-1942	Donau	1-Dec-1942	40	Auschwitz	
Kronik	Ame	21-Sep-1924	Oslo	Oslo	Steel worker	26-Oct-1942	26-Nov-1942	Donau	Feb 43	18	Auschwitz	79155
Kronik	Anna	5-Oct-1891	Oslo	Oslo	Homemaker	26-Nov-1942	26-Nov-1942	Donau	1-Dec-1942	51	Auschwitz	
Krupp	Bernhard	23-Mar-1916	Oslo	Oslo	Plumber	26-Oct-1942	26-Nov-1942	Donau	12-Jan-1943	26	Auschwitz	
Krupp	Hermann	1-Jan-1913	Oslo	Oslo	Cutter	26-Oct-1942	26-Nov-1942	Donau	30-Dec-1942	29	Auschwitz	79147
Krupp	Isak	15-May-1905	Oslo	Oslo	Businessman	26-Oct-1942	26-Nov-1942	Donau	22-Jan-1943	37	Auschwitz	79158
Krupp	Jan Larry	28-Jul-1942	Oslo	Oslo	Infant	26-Nov-1942	26-Nov-1942	Donau	1-Dec-1942	0	Auschwitz	
Krupp	Leopold	23-Dec-1911	Oslo	Oslo	Worker	26-Oct-1942	26-Nov-1942	Donau	12-Jan-1943	31	Auschwitz	
Krupp	Moses	23-Apr-1885	Oslo	Oslo	Traveling salesman	27-Oct-1942	24-Feb-1943	Gotenland	3-Mar-1943	57	Auschwitz	
Krupp	Rachel	10-Aug-1907	Oslo	Oslo	Office clerk	26-Nov-1942	26-Nov-1942	Donau	1-Dec-1942	35	Auschwitz	
Lahn	Abel	15-Oct-1892	Sandefjord	Vestfold	Merchant	26-Oct-1942	26-Nov-1942	Donau	Dec 42	50	Auschwitz	
Lahn	Herman	14-Jan-1920	Sandefjord	Vestfold	Student	26-Oct-1942	26-Nov-1942	Donau	Jan 43	22	Auschwitz	79174
Lahn	Oscar Ellis	1-Aug-1923	Sandefjord	Vestfold	Installer	26-Oct-1942	26-Nov-1942	Donau	Jan 43	19	Auschwitz	79175
Laksov	Håkon	29-Jul-1911	Oslo	Oslo	Attorney	26-Oct-1942	26-Nov-1942	Donau	Mar 43	31	Auschwitz	79179
Landau	Herman	20-Oct-1878	Skarnes	Hedmark	Tenant farmer	26-Oct-1942	26-Nov-1942	Donau	1-Dec-1942	64	Auschwitz	
Lasnik	Anna	19-Nov-1911	Oslo	Oslo	Merchant	26-Nov-1942	26-Nov-1942	Donau	1-Dec-1942	31	Auschwitz	
Lasnik	Dora	10-Oct-1888	Oslo	Oslo	Homemaker	26-Nov-1942	26-Nov-1942	Donau	1-Dec-1942	54	Auschwitz	
Lasnik	Elias	24-Dec-1887	Oslo	Oslo	Roofer	26-Oct-1942	26-Nov-1942	Donau	1-Dec-1942	54	Auschwitz	
Lasnik	Kathe Rita	13-Oct-1927	Oslo	Oslo	High school student	26-Nov-1942	26-Nov-1942	Donau	1-Dec-1942	15	Auschwitz	
Leimann	Bernhard	24-Aug-1897	Oslo	Oslo	Tailor	26-Oct-1942	26-Nov-1942	Donau	Jan 43	45	Auschwitz	
Leimann	Dina	19-Nov-1903	Oslo	Oslo	Retail clerk	26-Nov-1942	26-Nov-1942	Donau	1-Dec-1942	39	Auschwitz	
Leimann	Isak	16-Dec-1869	Oslo	Oslo	Merchant	26-Nov-1942	26-Nov-1942	Donau	1-Dec-1942	72	Auschwitz	
Leimann	Martha	10-Sep-1885	Oslo	Oslo	Homemaker	26-Nov-1942	26-Nov-1942	Donau	2-Jan-1943	57	Auschwitz	
Lemkow	Dora	25-Nov-1888	Oslo	Oslo	Homemaker	26-Nov-1942	26-Nov-1942	Donau	1-Dec-1942	54	Auschwitz	
Lemkow	Ethel Frida	26-Jun-1920	Oslo	Oslo	Dental assistant	26-Nov-1942	26-Nov-1942	Donau	1-Dec-1942	22	Auschwitz	
Lemos de	Sigrid	8-Mar-1883	Oslo	Oslo	Language teacher	26-Oct-1942	26-Nov-1942	Donau	1-Dec-1942	59	Auschwitz	
Leopold	Martha	20-Mar-1882	Lillehammer	Oppland	Homemaker	26-Nov-1942	26-Nov-1942	Donau	1-Dec-1942	60	Auschwitz	
Leventhal	Benjamin	31-Oct-1909	Oslo	Oslo	Hair stylist	26-Oct-1942	26-Nov-1942	Donau	4-Jan-1943	33	Auschwitz	
Leventhal	Berit	6-Aug-1934	Oslo	Oslo	Pupil	26-Nov-1942	26-Nov-1942	Donau	1-Dec-1942	8	Auschwitz	
Leventhal	Esther	11-Aug-1913	Oslo	Oslo	Homemaker	26-Nov-1942	26-Nov-1942	Donau	1-Dec-1942	29	Auschwitz	
Leventhal	Flora	20-Sep-1878	Oslo	Oslo	Homemaker	26-Nov-1942	26-Nov-1942	Donau	1-Dec-1942	64	Auschwitz	
Leventhal	Isak	27-Jun-1880	Oslo	Oslo	Traveling salesman	26-Oct-1942	26-Nov-1942	Donau	1-Dec-1942	62	Auschwitz	
Levin	Karl	15-Nov-1887	Oslo	Oslo	Retail clerk	26-Oct-1942	26-Nov-1942	Donau		55	Auschwitz	79177
Levin	Lea	29-Aug-1905	Trondheim	Sør-Trøndelag	Manager	25-Nov-1942	24-Feb-1943	Gotenland	3-Mar-1943	37	Auschwitz	
Levin	Leonard	31-May-1905	Oslo	Oslo	Physician	1-Apr-1942	26-Nov-1942	Monte Rosa	19-Jan-1943	37	Auschwitz	
Levin	Leopold	18-Nov-1899	Orkanger	Sør-Trøndelag	Merchant	26-Oct-1942	26-Nov-1942	Donau	4-Jan-1943	43	Auschwitz	
Levin	Lisa	18-Apr-1896	Oslo	Oslo	Seamstress	26-Nov-1942	24-Feb-1943	Gotenland	3-Mar-1943	46	Auschwitz	
Levin	Ragnhild	12-Oct-1912	Trondheim	Sør-Trøndelag	Cutter	25-Nov-1942	24-Feb-1943	Gotenland	3-Mar-1943	30	Auschwitz	
Levin	Sigurd	21-Mar-1898	Oslo	Oslo	Merchant	3-Sep-1942	20-Nov-1942	Monte Rosa	Jan 43	44	Auschwitz	
Levinsohn	Aron	9-Feb-1900	Elverum	Hedmark	Merchant	11-Sep-1942	20-Nov-1942	Monte Rosa	4-Jan-1943	42	Auschwitz	105672
Levinsohn	Mina	25-Jun-1907	Oslo	Oslo	Office clerk	26-Nov-1942	26-Nov-1942	Donau	1-Dec-1942	35	Auschwitz	
Levinsohn	Mina Micle	26-Mar-1868	Oslo	Oslo	Homemaker	26-Nov-1942	26-Nov-1942	Donau	1-Dec-1942	74	Auschwitz	
Levinsohn	Moses	7-Jun-1866	Oslo	Oslo	Merchant	26-Nov-1942	26-Nov-1942	Donau	1-Dec-1942	76	Auschwitz	
Levinson	Anna	14-Oct-1919	Oslo	Oslo	Seamstress	26-Nov-1942	26-Nov-1942	Donau	1-Dec-1942	23	Auschwitz	
Levinson	Bernhard Jacob	25-Jan-1889	Oslo	Oslo	Merchant	2-Sep-1942	20-Nov-1942	Monte Rosa	Jan 43	53	Auschwitz	
Levinson	Dina Rosa	4-Jan-1924	Oslo	Oslo	Factory worker	26-Nov-1942	26-Nov-1942	Donau	1-Dec-1942	18	Auschwitz	
Levinson	Herman	8-Jan-1918	Oslo	Oslo	Carpenter	26-Oct-1942	26-Nov-1942	Donau	18-Jan-1943	25	Auschwitz	
Levinson	Jette	3-Jan-1887	Oslo	Oslo	Homemaker	26-Nov-1942	26-Nov-1942	Donau	1-Dec-1942	55	Auschwitz	
Levinson	Salomon	15-Aug-1889	Oslo	Oslo	Worker	27-Oct-1942	26-Nov-1942	Donau	1-Dec-1942	53	Auschwitz	79166
Levinson	Samuel	13-Oct-1920	Oslo	Oslo	Retail clerk	26-Oct-1942	26-Nov-1942	Donau	5-Feb-1943	22	Auschwitz	
Levinson	Simon	27-Jun-1913	Oslo	Oslo	Warehouse worker	26-Oct-1942	26-Nov-1942	Donau		29		105345
Levkowitz	Simon	12-May-1883	Oslo	Oslo	Barber	26-Oct-1942	24-Feb-1943	Gotenland	3-Mar-1943	59	Auschwitz	
Lewenstein	Benjamin	1-Oct-1891	Oslo	Oslo	Glassmaker	27-Oct-1942	26-Nov-1942	Donau	Jan 43	51	Auschwitz	79173
Lewenstein	Heimann	11-Jun-1920	Oslo	Oslo	Glassmaker	23-Jun-1941	26-Nov-1942	Donau	Feb 43	22	Auschwitz	79171
Lewenstein	Meier Bjørn	10-Jan-1915	Oslo	Oslo	Glassmaker apprentice	23-Jun-1941	26-Nov-1942	Donau	19-Jan-1943	28	Auschwitz	
Lewenstein	Salomon	28-Nov-1916	Oslo	Oslo	Glassmaker	23-Jun-1941	26-Nov-1942	Donau	27-Jan-1943	26	Auschwitz	79172
Lewenstein	Sara	15-Oct-1887	Oslo	Oslo	Homemaker	26-Nov-1942	26-Nov-1942	Donau	1-Dec-1942	55	Auschwitz	
Lewin	Eugen	24-Apr-1883	Oslo	Oslo	Ethnologist	9-Jan-1942		Other route	Jul 42	59	Unknown	
Libowitz	David	8-Jan-1886	Oslo	Oslo	Fruit merchant	27-Oct-1942	26-Nov-1942	Donau	1-Dec-1942	56	Auschwitz	
Loewy	Fritz	27-Nov-1898	Oslo	Oslo		26-Oct-1942	26-Nov-1942	Donau	1-Dec-1942	44	Auschwitz	
Løgård	Leo	23-May-1912	Oslo	Oslo	Dental technician	26-Oct-1942	26-Nov-1942	Donau	Jan 43	30	Auschwitz	
Lomnitz	Elfriede	13-Dec-1885	Oslo	Oslo	Homemaker	26-Nov-1942	24-Feb-1943	Gotenland	3-Mar-1943	57	Auschwitz	
Lomnitz Lurje	Felix Georg Salomon	29-Nov-1884	Oslo	Oslo	Businessman	26-Oct-1942	24-Feb-1943	Gotenland	3-Mar-1943	58	Auschwitz	
Løwidt	Kurt	14-May-1921	Oslo	Oslo	Cook	26-Oct-1942	26-Nov-1942	Donau	19-Jan-1943	21	Auschwitz	
Løwy	Fritz Gustav	12-Aug-1870	Oslo	Oslo		26-Oct-1942	26-Nov-1942	Donau	27-Dec-1942	72	Auschwitz	79176
Lurje	Salomon	25-Dec-1888	Oslo	Oslo		26-Oct-1942	24-Feb-1943	Gotenland	3-Mar-1943	54	Auschwitz	
**Lustig**	**Fritz**	28-Oct-1922	Nesjestranda in Molde	Møre og Romsdal	Student	16-Mar-1942	24-Feb-1943	Gotenland	Survived			105350
Lustig	Nora	22-Apr-1899	Nesjestranda in Molde	Møre og Romsdal	Homemaker	16-Mar-1942	24-Feb-1943	Gotenland	3-Mar-1943	43	Auschwitz	
**Lustig (Levold)**	**Hans**	28-Oct-1922	Nesjestranda in Molde	Møre og Romsdal	Student	16-Mar-1942	24-Feb-1943	Gotenland	Survived			105351
Magnus	Else	9-Mar-1869	Oslo	Oslo		26-Nov-1942	26-Nov-1942	Donau	1-Dec-1942	73	Auschwitz	
Magnus	Gertrud	29-Feb-1904	Oslo	Oslo		26-Nov-1942	26-Nov-1942	Donau	1-Dec-1942	38	Auschwitz	
Mahler	Abraham	9-Jun-1920	Strinda	Sør-Trøndelag	Office clerk	31-Oct-1942	26-Nov-1942	Donau	26-Apr-1943	22	Auschwitz	
Mahler	Malke Rachel	2-Apr-1896	Strinda	Sør-Trøndelag	Homemaker	25-Nov-1942	24-Feb-1943	Gotenland	3-Mar-1943	46	Auschwitz	
Mahler	Mina	18-Aug-1927	Trondheim	Sør-Trøndelag	Pupil	25-Nov-1942	24-Feb-1943	Gotenland	3-Mar-1943	15	Auschwitz	
Mahler	Selig	3-Nov-1923	Strinda	Sør-Trøndelag	Pupil	26-Nov-1942	26-Nov-1942	Donau	Dec 42	19	Auschwitz	79183
Mahler	Simon	31-Dec-1886	Strinda	Sør-Trøndelag	Merchant	26-Nov-1942	26-Nov-1942	Donau	1-Dec-1942	55	Auschwitz	
Maier	Ruth	10-Nov-1920	Oslo	Oslo		26-Nov-1942	26-Nov-1942	Donau	1-Dec-1942	22	Auschwitz	
Maliniak	Jacques	31-Oct-1883	Trondheim	Sør-Trøndelag	Music conductor	7-Oct-1942	24-Feb-1943	Gotenland	3-Mar-1943	59	Auschwitz	
Maliniak	Mathilde	21-Mar-1887	Trondheim	Sør-Trøndelag	Language teacher	25-Nov-1942	24-Feb-1943	Gotenland	3-Mar-1943	55	Auschwitz	
Mankowitz	Max Abraham	30-Oct-1892	Oslo	Oslo	Tailor	27-Oct-1942	26-Nov-1942	Donau	Feb 43	50	Auschwitz	
Marianson	Isak Leib	21-Sep-1889	Bergen	Hordaland	Transient	28-Jun-1941	26-Nov-1942	Monte Rosa	17-Feb-1943	53	Auschwitz	
Markus	Jette Lea	13-Feb-1890	Elverum	Hedmark	Homemaker	26-Nov-1942	26-Nov-1942	Donau	1-Dec-1942	52	Auschwitz	
Markus	Leif Sigurd	22-Aug-1919	Elverum	Hedmark	Bookkeeper	23-Mar-1942	26-Nov-1942	Monte Rosa	May 43	23	Auschwitz	
Markus	Liv	23-Jan-1925	Elverum	Hedmark	High school student	26-Nov-1942	26-Nov-1942	Donau	1-Dec-1942	17	Auschwitz	
Markus	Ragnar	3-Jul-1937	Elverum	Hedmark	Pupil	26-Nov-1942	26-Nov-1942	Donau	1-Dec-1942	5	Auschwitz	
Markus	Selik	23-May-1882	Elverum	Hedmark	Merchant	13-Aug-1942	20-Nov-1942	Monte Rosa	Jan 43	60	Auschwitz	
Markus	Sylvia	10-Nov-1926	Elverum	Hedmark	Pupil	26-Nov-1942	26-Nov-1942	Donau	1-Dec-1942	16	Auschwitz	
Matolsky	Anna	14-Dec-1897	Oslo	Oslo	Homemaker	26-Nov-1942	26-Nov-1942	Donau	1-Dec-1942	44	Auschwitz	
Matolsky	Carl Herman	15-Mar-1882	Oslo	Oslo	Merchant	26-Oct-1942	26-Nov-1942	Donau	Dec 42	60	Auschwitz	
Medvedjeff	Julius	3-May-1884	Oslo	Oslo	Tobacco worker	26-Oct-1942	24-Feb-1943	Gotenland	3-Mar-1943	58	Auschwitz	
Meieranovski	Charles	15-Jul-1915	Oslo	Oslo	Retail clerk	26-Oct-1942	26-Nov-1942	Donau	Dec 42	27	Auschwitz	
Meieranovski	Moritz	25-Nov-1881	Oslo	Oslo	Merchant	26-Oct-1942	24-Feb-1943	Gotenland	3-Mar-1943	61	Auschwitz	
Meieranovski	Rosa	5-May-1880	Oslo	Oslo	Homemaker	26-Nov-1942	26-Nov-1942	Donau	1-Dec-1942	62	Auschwitz	
Meifan	Jacob	20-Dec-1905	Oslo	Oslo	Factory owner	26-Oct-1942	26-Nov-1942	Donau	3-Mar-1943	37	Auschwitz	79182
Meiran	Ellinor	10-Sep-1937	Oslo	Oslo	Pupil	26-Nov-1942	26-Nov-1942	Donau	1-Dec-1942	5	Auschwitz	
Meltzer	Ludwig	7-Mar-1886	Hordaland	Hordaland	Merchant	26-Oct-1942	26-Nov-1942	Donau	1-Dec-1942	56	Auschwitz	
Mendel	Esther	24-May-1914	Oslo	Oslo	Postal worker	26-Nov-1942	26-Nov-1942	Donau	1-Dec-1942	28	Auschwitz	
Mendel	Harry Isidor	10-Jul-1918	Oslo	Oslo	Musician	26-Oct-1942	26-Nov-1942	Donau	1-Dec-1942	24	Auschwitz	
Mendelsohn	Aron	17-Nov-1871	Trondheim	Sør-Trøndelag	Factory owner	25-Nov-1942	24-Feb-1943	Gotenland	3-Mar-1943	71	Auschwitz	
Mendelsohn	Henryk	4-Nov-1896	Trondheim	Sør-Trøndelag	Factory owner	26-Oct-1942	24-Feb-1943	Gotenland	Spring '44	47	Auschwitz	105353
Mendelsohn	Thora	19-Mar-1874	Trondheim	Sør-Trøndelag	Homemaker	25-Nov-1942	24-Feb-1943	Gotenland	3-Mar-1943	68	Auschwitz	
Mesner	Herman	12-May-1911	Oslo	Oslo	Factory owner	27-Oct-1942	26-Nov-1942	Donau	5-Jan-1943	31	Auschwitz	
Meszansky	Martin	29-Nov-1904	Oslo	Oslo	Factory owner	26-Oct-1942	26-Nov-1942	Donau			Auschwitz	79185
Meyer	Ethel	10-Nov-1886	Trondheim	Sør-Trøndelag	Businesswoman	26-Nov-1942	24-Feb-1943	Gotenland	3-Mar-1943	56	Auschwitz	
**Meyer**	**Harry**	7-Nov-1912	Trondheim	Sør-Trøndelag	Attorney	1-Apr-1943		Kvarstad	Survived			
Michel	Heinz Adolf	28-Mar-1910	Oslo	Oslo	Merchant	26-Oct-1942	26-Nov-1942	Donau	1-Apr-1943	33	Auschwitz	79184
Millamed	Herman	30-May-1866	Oslo	Oslo	Warehouse worker	26-Nov-1942	26-Nov-1942	Donau	1-Dec-1942	76	Auschwitz	
Minster	Josef	5-May-1916	Oslo	Oslo	Day laborer	27-Oct-1942	26-Nov-1942	Donau	Mar 43	26	Auschwitz	
Minster	Mina	10-Jan-1893	Oslo	Oslo	Greengrocer	26-Nov-1942	26-Nov-1942	Donau	1-Dec-1942	49	Auschwitz	
Mogolovsky	Rolf Elja	21-Sep-1889	Oslo	Oslo	Sales agent	27-Oct-1942	26-Nov-1942	Donau	1-Dec-1942	53	Auschwitz	
Mollet	Moritz	24-Jun-1891	Hurum	Buskerud	Merchant	26-Oct-1942	26-Nov-1942	Donau	1-Dec-1942	51	Auschwitz	
Moritz	Aksel	17-Aug-1906	Oslo	Oslo	Book printer	26-Oct-1942	26-Nov-1942	Donau	14-Jan-1943	36	Auschwitz	79187
Moritz	Ben Abraham	1-Apr-1911	Oslo	Oslo	Pianist	26-Oct-1942	26-Nov-1942	Donau	13-Jan-1943	31	Auschwitz	79188
Moritz	Ester	17-May-1908	Oslo	Oslo	Maid	26-Nov-1942	26-Nov-1942	Donau	1-Dec-1942	34	Auschwitz	
Moritz	John Charles	26-Jul-1937	Oslo	Oslo	Pupil	26-Nov-1942	26-Nov-1942	Donau	1-Dec-1942	5	Auschwitz	
Moritz	Leif	29-Apr-1933	Oslo	Oslo	Pupil	26-Nov-1942	26-Nov-1942	Donau	1-Dec-1942	9	Auschwitz	
Moritz	Rakel	4-Mar-1877	Oslo	Oslo	Homemaker	26-Nov-1942	26-Nov-1942	Donau	1-Dec-1942	65	Auschwitz	
Moritz	Sara	15-Jan-1904	Oslo	Oslo	Factory owner	26-Nov-1942	26-Nov-1942	Donau	1-Dec-1942	38	Auschwitz	
Moritz	Sonja Ester	1-Nov-1911	Oslo	Oslo	Homemaker	26-Nov-1942	26-Nov-1942	Donau	1-Dec-1942	31	Auschwitz	
Muller	Bertha	14-Feb-1932	Bergen	Hordaland	Pupil	26-Nov-1942	24-Feb-1943	Gotenland	3-Mar-1943	11	Auschwitz	
Müller	Cecylie	27-Feb-1907	Bergen	Hordaland	Homemaker	26-Nov-1942	24-Feb-1943	Gotenland	3-Mar-1943	36	Auschwitz	
Müller	Oscar	30-Jun-1928	Bergen	Hordaland	Pupil	26-Nov-1942	24-Feb-1943	Gotenland	3-Mar-1943	14	Auschwitz	
Nachemsohn	Gulmann	25-Apr-1879	Oslo	Oslo	Transient	26-Nov-1942	26-Nov-1942	Donau	1-Dec-1942	63	Auschwitz	
Nachemsohn	Hanna	10-Jan-1890	Oslo	Oslo	Homemaker	26-Nov-1942	26-Nov-1942	Donau	1-Dec-1942	52	Auschwitz	
Nachemsohn	Henry	10-Aug-1916	Oslo	Oslo	Book printer	26-Oct-1942	26-Nov-1942	Donau	1-Dec-1942	26	Auschwitz	79193
Nachemsohn	Samuel	10-Oct-1913	Oslo	Oslo	Sales agent	26-Oct-1942	26-Nov-1942	Donau	22-Jan-1943	29	Auschwitz	
**Nachtstern**	**Moritz**	11-Nov-1902	Oslo	Oslo	Typographer	26-Oct-1942	26-Nov-1942	Donau	Survived			79194
Nathan	Einar	23-Dec-1886	Oslo	Oslo	Attorney	27-Oct-1942	20-Nov-1942	Monte Rosa	Jan 43	56	Auschwitz	
Nathan	Selma	23-Mar-1888	Oslo	Oslo	Homemaker	26-Nov-1942	26-Nov-1942	Donau	1-Dec-1942	54	Auschwitz	
Omstein	Leonhard	23-Jul-1868	Oslo	Oslo		26-Oct-1942	24-Feb-1943	Gotenland	3-Mar-1943	74	Auschwitz	
Oster	Ida	9-Aug-1885	Oslo	Oslo	Homemaker	26-Nov-1942	26-Nov-1942	Donau	1-Dec-1942	57	Auschwitz	
Oster	Max	1-Dec-1884	Oslo	Oslo	Sign maker	26-Oct-1942	26-Nov-1942	Donau	1-Dec-1942	57	Auschwitz	
Oster	Miriam	31-Dec-1918	Oslo	Oslo	Redaktør	26-Nov-1942	26-Nov-1942	Donau	1-Dec-1942	23	Auschwitz	
Oster	Rebekka	20-Oct-1914	Bærum	Akershus	Redaktør	26-Nov-1942	26-Nov-1942	Donau	1-Dec-1942	28	Auschwitz	
Pajkin	Isja	1-Nov-1891	Oslo	Oslo	Merchant	27-Oct-1942	26-Nov-1942	Donau	1-Dec-1942	51	Auschwitz	
Pajkin	Ivar	3-Jun-1926	Oslo	Oslo	Pupil	26-Oct-1942	26-Nov-1942	Donau	1-Dec-1942	16	Auschwitz	
Paltiel	Idar	24-May-1919	Trondheim	Sør-Trøndelag	Merchant	26-Oct-1942	26-Nov-1942	Donau	13-Feb-1943	23	Auschwitz	79200
**Paltiel**	**Julius Louis**	4-Jul-1924	Trondheim	Sør-Trøndelag	High school student	7-Oct-1942	24-Feb-1943	Gotenland	Survived			105362
Paltiel	Kaja Ruth	23-Sep-1895	Trondheim	Sør-Trøndelag	Entrepreneur	25-Nov-1942	24-Feb-1943	Gotenland	3-Mar-1943	47	Auschwitz	
Philipsohn	Abraham	19-Dec-1864	Trondheim	Sør-Trøndelag	Merchant	7-Oct-1942	24-Feb-1943	Gotenland	3-Mar-1943	78	Auschwitz	
Philipsohn	Esther Rosa	19-Sep-1903	Trondheim	Sør-Trøndelag	Retail clerk	25-Nov-1942	24-Feb-1943	Gotenland	3-Mar-1943	39	Auschwitz	
Philipsohn	Maja	15-May-1912	Trondheim	Sør-Trøndelag	Retail clerk	25-Nov-1942	24-Feb-1943	Gotenland	3-Mar-1943	30	Auschwitz	
Philipsohn	Phillip	10-Aug-1897	Berlevåg	Finnmark	Construction worker	26-Oct-1942	26-Nov-1942	Donau	Jan 43	45	Auschwitz	
Pickelner	Isak	8-Sep-1887	Narvik	Nordland	Executive	18-Jun-1941	26-Nov-1942	Monte Rosa	Jan 43	55	Auschwitz	
Pinkowitz	Ruben	17-Feb-1889	Oslo	Oslo	Factory owner	26-Oct-1942	26-Nov-1942	Donau	Jan 43	53	Auschwitz	
Pinkowitz	Salomon	6-Jan-1896	Oslo	Oslo	Painter	26-Oct-1942	26-Nov-1942	Donau	15-Feb-1943	47	Auschwitz	
Pintzow	Michael Wulff	24-Jun-1910	Oslo	Oslo	Merchant	26-Oct-1942	24-Feb-1943	Gotenland	28-Apr-1945	34	Gleiwitz	105371
Pintzow	Samuel Jacob	13-Dec-1879	Oslo	Oslo	Factory owner	26-Oct-1942	24-Feb-1943	Gotenland	3-Mar-1943	63	Auschwitz	
Pinzow	Ruben	11-Mar-1914	Oslo	Oslo	Retail clerk	26-Oct-1942	26-Nov-1942	Donau	13-Jan-1943	28	Auschwitz	
Plavnik	Elias	14-Aug-1915	Oslo	Oslo	Retail clerk	26-Oct-1942	26-Nov-1942	Donau	23-Mar-1943	27	Auschwitz	79197
Plavnik	Oskar	25-Jan-1919	Oslo	Oslo	Engineer	26-Oct-1942	26-Nov-1942	Donau	5-Feb-1943	24	Auschwitz	
Plavnik	Salomon	18-Jan-1882	Oslo	Oslo	Wholesaler	26-Oct-1942	26-Nov-1942	Donau	1-Dec-1942	60	Auschwitz	
Plesansky	Gabriel	12-Jul-1894	Oslo	Oslo	Factory owner	2-Sep-1942	20-Nov-1942	Monte Rosa	10-Apr-1943	48	Auschwitz	
Plesansky	Isak	4-May-1892	Tønsberg	Vestfold	Merchant	26-Oct-1942	26-Nov-1942	Donau	1-Dec-1942	50	Auschwitz	
Plesansky	Mauritz	28-May-1924	Oslo	Oslo	High school student	26-Oct-1942	26-Nov-1942	Donau	Feb 43	18	Auschwitz	79196
Plesansky	Mina	7-May-1932	Tønsberg	Vestfold	Pupil	26-Nov-1942	26-Nov-1942	Donau	1-Dec-1942	10	Auschwitz	
Plesansky	Rosa	5-Feb-1894	Tønsberg	Vestfold	Homemaker	26-Nov-1942	26-Nov-1942	Donau	1-Dec-1942	48	Auschwitz	
Plesansky	Sem	4-Jan-1930	Tønsberg	Vestfold	Pupil	26-Nov-1942	26-Nov-1942	Donau	1-Dec-1942	12	Auschwitz	
Rabinowitz	Hermann H.	30-Oct-1891	Bergen	Hordaland	Merchant	30-Oct-1942	26-Nov-1942	Donau	22-Dec-1942	51	Auschwitz	79204
Rabinowitz	Moritz	20-Sep-1887	Haugesund	Rogaland	Merchant	4-Dec-1940	22-May-1941	Other transport	27-Feb-1942	54	Sachsenhausen	
Ramson	Benno	28-Oct-1896	Oslo	Oslo	Factor manager	26-Oct-1942	26-Nov-1942	Donau	Jan 43	46	Auschwitz	
Raphael	Edith	8-Aug-1906	Oslo	Oslo	Homemaker	26-Nov-1942	24-Feb-1943	Gotenland	3-Mar-1943	36	Auschwitz	
Raskow	Joseph	25-Sep-1903	Oslo	Oslo	Merchant	26-Oct-1942	26-Nov-1942	Donau	1-Mar-1943	39	Auschwitz	79206
**Rechenberg**.	**Georg**	7-Dec-1912	Haugesund	Rogaland	Dental technician	26-Oct-1942	26-Nov-1942	Donau	Survived			79207
Reichmann	Anna Frume	23-Feb-1910	Oslo	Oslo	Homemaker	26-Nov-1942	26-Nov-1942	Donau	1-Dec-1942	32	Auschwitz	
Reichmann	Arne	18-Feb-1922	Oslo	Oslo	Office clerk	26-Oct-1942	26-Nov-1942	Donau	2-Mar-1943	21	Auschwitz	79209
Reichmann	David Michel	20-Aug-1916	Oslo	Oslo	Journalist	26-Oct-1942	26-Nov-1942	Donau	25-Feb-1943	26	Auschwitz	79210
Reichmann	Gerhard	21-May-1942	Oslo	Oslo	Infant	26-Nov-1942	26-Nov-1942	Donau	1-Dec-1942	6 months	Auschwitz	
Reichmann	Nathan	7-Jun-1888	Oslo	Oslo	Merchant	26-Oct-1942	26-Nov-1942	Donau	1-Dec-1942	54	Auschwitz	
Reichwald	Edith	16-Aug-1918	Skånevik	Hordaland	Homemaker	26-Nov-1942	24-Feb-1943	Gotenland	3-Mar-1943	24	Auschwitz	
Reichwald	Hans	29-Sep-1916	Skånevik	Hordaland	Machine installer	26-Oct-1942	26-Nov-1942	Donau	17-Jan-1943	26	Auschwitz	
Reichwald	Harry	23-Nov-1940	Skånevik	Hordaland	Child	26-Nov-1942	24-Feb-1943	Gotenland	3-Mar-1943	2	Auschwitz	
Reichwald	Jakob	13-Mar-1887	Skånevik	Hordaland	Disabled war veteran	26-Oct-1942	26-Nov-1942	Donau	1-Dec-1942	55	Auschwitz	
Reichwald	Jeanette	8-Jun-1887	Skånevik	Hordaland	Homemaker	26-Oct-1942	24-Feb-1943	Gotenland	3-Mar-1943	55	Auschwitz	
Reiff	Abel	17-Nov-1893	Oslo	Oslo	Tailor	26-Oct-1942	26-Nov-1942	Donau	24-Feb-1943	49	Auschwitz	79211
Reiff	Cecilie	17-May-1910	Oslo	Oslo	Homemaker	26-Nov-1942	26-Nov-1942	Donau	1-Dec-1942	32	Auschwitz	
Reiff	Leopold Wulf	21-Jan-1887	Oslo	Oslo	Tailor	26-Nov-1942	26-Nov-1942	Donau	1-Dec-1942	55	Auschwitz	
Reiss	Johan	25-Jul-1929	Oslo	Oslo	Pupil	26-Nov-1942	26-Nov-1942	Donau	1-Dec-1942	13	Auschwitz	
Reiss	Robert	19-May-1928	Ås	Akershus	Pupil	26-Nov-1942	24-Feb-1943	Gotenland	3-Mar-1943	14	Auschwitz	
Resnick	Zemack	17-Dec-1893	Tromsø	Troms	Merchant	4-Jun-1941	26-Nov-1942	Monte Rosa	14-Jan-1943	49	Auschwitz	
Rosenberg	Arthur	15-May-1899	Son	Østfold	Merchant	5-Mar-1942	21-May-1942	Other route	Jan 42	42	Lublin	
Rosenberg	Bernhard	16-Mar-1895	Trondheim	Sør-Trøndelag	Tailor	7-Oct-1942	24-Feb-1943	Gotenland	3-Mar-1943	47	Auschwitz	
Rosenberg	Charles	12-May-1924	Trondheim	Sør-Trøndelag	Messenger	7-Oct-1942	24-Feb-1943	Gotenland	3-Mar-1943	18	Auschwitz	
Rosenberg	Elly	1-Jul-1906	Oslo	Oslo	Homemaker	26-Nov-1942	26-Nov-1942	Donau	1-Dec-1942	36	Auschwitz	
Rosenberg	Ignaz	12-Jul-1874	Oslo	Oslo	Sales agent	26-Nov-1942	26-Nov-1942	Donau	1-Dec-1942	68	Auschwitz	
Rosenberg	Jenny	20-Dec-1895	Trondheim	Sør-Trøndelag	Homemaker	25-Nov-1942	24-Feb-1943	Gotenland	3-Mar-1943	47	Auschwitz	
Rosenberg	Rosa	5-Jan-1880	Oslo	Oslo	Homemaker	26-Nov-1942	26-Nov-1942	Donau	1-Dec-1942	62	Auschwitz	
Rosenblum	Lesser	23-Jun-1880	Oslo	Oslo	Lathe operator	26-Oct-1942	26-Nov-1942	Donau	1-Dec-1942	62	Auschwitz	
Rothenberg	Mathilde	27-Jan-1891	Oslo	Oslo	Homemaker	26-Nov-1942	26-Nov-1942	Donau	1-Dec-1942	51	Auschwitz	
Rothkopf	Wilhelm	17-Aug-1903	Oslo	Oslo		26-Oct-1942	24-Feb-1943	Gotenland	19-Aug-1943	40	Auschwitz	
Rothschild	Rosa	20-Oct-1875	Oslo	Oslo	Homemaker	26-Nov-1942	26-Nov-1942	Donau	1-Dec-1942	67	Auschwitz	
Rottmann	Leopold	24-May-1917	Oslo	Oslo	Roofer	26-Oct-1942	26-Nov-1942	Donau	13-Jan-1943	25	Auschwitz	
Rottmann	Max Wulff	23-Apr-1890	Oslo	Oslo	Roofer	26-Oct-1942	26-Nov-1942	Donau	Jan 43	52	Auschwitz	
Rottmann	Sara	7-May-1892	Oslo	Oslo	Seamstress	26-Nov-1942	26-Nov-1942	Donau	1-Dec-1942	50	Auschwitz	
Rouff	Bertha	6-Aug-1917	Oslo	Oslo	Homemaker	26-Nov-1942	26-Nov-1942	Donau	1-Dec-1942	25	Auschwitz	
Rubinstein	Isidor	28-Mar-1909	Oslo	Oslo		19-Apr-1941	7-Jan-1942	Other route	27-Mar-1945	35	Mieste	
Rubinstein	Molly Amalie	24-Aug-1913	Oslo	Oslo	Seamstress	26-Nov-1942	26-Nov-1942	Donau	1-Dec-1942	29	Auschwitz	
Rubinstein	Oskar	20-Apr-1885	Oslo	Oslo	Merchant	26-Oct-1942	26-Nov-1942	Donau	1-Dec-1942	57	Auschwitz	
Rubinstein	Rosa	2-Feb-1887	Oslo	Oslo	Homemaker	26-Nov-1942	26-Nov-1942	Donau	1-Dec-1942	55	Auschwitz	
Rubinstein	Viktor	26-Nov-1922	Oslo	Oslo	Apprentice	26-Oct-1942	26-Nov-1942	Donau	23-Dec-1942	20	Auschwitz	
**Ruzicka**	**Fritz Georg**	28-Apr-1908	Oslo	Oslo	Journalist	4-Nov-1942	28-May-1944	Other route	Survived		Stutthof	
Sachnowitz	Elias	1-Oct-1911	Stokke	Vestfold	Merchant	26-Oct-1942	26-Nov-1942	Donau	22-Feb-1943	31	Auschwitz	
Sachnowitz	Frank	8-Feb-1925	Stokke	Vestfold	Farm hand	26-Oct-1942	26-Nov-1942	Donau	15-Jul-1943	18	Natzweiler	
Sachnowitz	Frida	21-Jul-1923	Stokke	Vestfold	High school student	26-Nov-1942	24-Feb-1943	Gotenland	3-Mar-1943	19	Auschwitz	
**Sachnowitz**	**Herman**	13-Jun-1921	Stokke	Vestfold	Musician	26-Oct-1942	26-Nov-1942	Donau	Survived			
Sachnowitz	Israel Leib	31-Mar-1880	Stokke	Vestfold	Merchant	26-Oct-1942	26-Nov-1942	Donau	1-Dec-1942	62	Auschwitz	
Sachnowitz	Marie	11-Apr-1919	Stokke	Vestfold	Retail clerk	26-Nov-1942	26-Nov-1942	Donau	1-Dec-1942	23	Auschwitz	
Sachnowitz	Martin	10-Oct-1910	Stokke	Vestfold	Retail clerk	26-Oct-1942	26-Nov-1942	Donau	14-Mar-1943	32	Auschwitz	
Sachnowitz	Rita	1-Aug-1915	Stokke	Vestfold	Office clerk	26-Nov-1942	24-Feb-1943	Gotenland	3-Mar-1943	27	Auschwitz	
Sachnowitz	Samuel	8-Dec-1912	Stokke	Vestfold	Retail clerk	26-Oct-1942	26-Nov-1942	Donau	11-Jan-1943	30	Auschwitz	
Sakolsky	Rebekka	20-Sep-1912	Tromsø	Troms	Homemaker	26-Nov-1942	24-Feb-1943	Gotenland	3-Mar-1943	30	Auschwitz	
Sakolsky	Ruth	5-Jul-1940	Tromsø	Troms	Child	26-Nov-1942	24-Feb-1943	Gotenland	3-Mar-1943	2	Auschwitz Auschwitz	
Sakolsky	Selik	24-Dec-1887	Tromsø	Troms	Merchant	18-Jun-1941	26-Nov-1942	Monte Rosa	1-Dec-1943	55	Auschwitz	
Salit	Eva	15-Mar-1882	Oslo	Oslo	Homemaker	26-Nov-1942	26-Nov-1942	Donau	1-Dec-1942	60	Auschwitz	
Salit	Mary	28-Mar-1903	Oslo	Oslo	Office clerk	26-Nov-1942	26-Nov-1942	Donau	1-Dec-1942	39	Auschwitz	
Salomon	Elly	23-Jul-1910	Oslo	Oslo	Secretary	26-Nov-1942	26-Nov-1942	Donau	1-Dec-1942	32	Auschwitz	
Samersav	Anna	15-May-1889	Oslo	Oslo	Homemaker	26-Nov-1942	26-Nov-1942	Donau	1-Dec-1942	53	Auschwitz	
Samersav	Rachel	6-Jun-1916	Oslo	Oslo	Spinner	26-Nov-1942	26-Nov-1942	Donau	1-Dec-1942	26	Auschwitz	
Samersav	Rudolf	21-Jun-1919	Oslo	Oslo	Land worker	26-Oct-1942	26-Nov-1942	Donau	Jan 43	23	Auschwitz	
Samersav	William	13-Jan-1926	Oslo	Oslo	Mechanic	26-Oct-1942	26-Nov-1942	Donau	Jan 43	16	Auschwitz	79222
Samuel	Julius	19-Dec-1902	Oslo	Oslo	Rabbi	2-Sep-1942	20-Nov-1942	Monte Rosa	16-Dec-1942	39	Auschwitz	
Sangvil	Abraham	10-Jul-1894	Oslo	Oslo	Tailor	26-Oct-1942	26-Nov-1942	Donau	18-Feb-1943	48	Auschwitz	79223
Savosnick	Ernst	16-Jul-1879	Trondheim	Sør-Trøndelag	Watchmaker	8-Oct-1942	20-Nov-1942	Monte Rosa	13-Jun-1943	63	Auschwitz	79224
**Savosnick**	**Robert**	8-Oct-1915	Trondheim	Sør-Trøndelag	Medical student	26-Oct-1942	26-Nov-1942	Donau	Survived			79225
Scelowsky	John	21-May-1887	Oslo	Oslo	Textile agent	2-Sep-1942	20-Nov-1942	Monte Rosa	1-Dec-1942	55	Auschwitz	
Schacht	Adolf	13-Jun-1918	Oslo	Oslo	Waiter	26-Oct-1942	26-Nov-1942	Donau	Dec 43	25	Auschwitz	79230
Schacht	Harry	10-Apr-1923	Oslo	Oslo	Drawer	26-Oct-1942	26-Nov-1942	Donau	29-Jan-1943	19	Auschwitz	79228
Schacht	Olga	15-Dec-1892	Oslo	Oslo	Entrepreneur	26-Nov-1942	26-Nov-1942	Donau	1-Dec-1942	49	Auschwitz	
Schacht	Salomon	26-Mar-1921	Oslo	Oslo	Engineer	26-Oct-1942	26-Nov-1942	Donau	2-Mar-1943	21	Auschwitz	79239
Schapiro	Moses	18-Aug-1887	Mosjøen	Nordland	Leather merchant	26-Oct-1942	26-Nov-1942	Donau	1-Dec-1942	55	Auschwitz	
Schapow	Hanna	15-Mar-1900	Oslo	Oslo	Factory worker	26-Oct-1942	26-Nov-1942	Donau	1-Dec-1942	42	Auschwitz	
Schapow	Isak	12-Oct-1896	Hurum	Buskerud	Traveling salesman	26-Oct-1942	26-Nov-1942	Donau		46	Auschwitz	
Schapow	Jette	20-Dec-1895	Hurum	Buskerud	Homemaker	26-Nov-1942	26-Nov-1942	Donau	1-Dec-1942	46	Auschwitz	
Schapow	Julius	12-Aug-1922	Oslo	Oslo	Office clerk	26-Oct-1942	26-Nov-1942	Donau	Jan 43	20	Auschwitz	
Schapow	Lina	2-Dec-1901	Oslo	Oslo	Factory worker	26-Oct-1942	24-Feb-1943	Gotenland	3-Mar-1943	41	Auschwitz	
Schapow	Salomon	6-Feb-1892	Oslo	Oslo	Merchant	27-Oct-1942	26-Nov-1942	Donau	1-Dec-1942	50	Auschwitz	
Schapow	Sara	13-Aug-1907	Oslo	Oslo	Factory worker	26-Nov-1942	26-Nov-1942	Donau	1-Dec-1942	35	Auschwitz	
Scharff	Alexander	1-Apr-1882	Hønefoss	Buskerud	Sales agent	26-Oct-1942	26-Nov-1942	Donau	1-Dec-1942	60	Auschwitz	
Scharff	Aron	1-Apr-1886	Oslo	Oslo	Sales agent	24-Oct-1942	26-Nov-1942	Donau	1-Dec-1942	56	Auschwitz	
Scharff	Bjørn Meier	14-May-1940	Hønefoss	Buskerud	Child	26-Nov-1942	26-Nov-1942	Donau	1-Dec-1942	2	Auschwitz	
Scharff	Herman	30-Apr-1911	Hønefoss	Buskerud	Warehouse worker	26-Oct-1942	26-Nov-1942	Donau	Jan 43	31	Auschwitz	
Scharff	Idar	11-Aug-1941	Hønefoss	Buskerud	Child	26-Nov-1942	26-Nov-1942	Donau	1-Dec-1942	1	Auschwitz	
Scharff	Jacob	26-Oct-1908	Hønefoss	Buskerud	Musician	26-Oct-1942	26-Nov-1942	Donau	Dec 42	34	Auschwitz	79213
Scharff	Jessy	21-Nov-1921	Hønefoss	Buskerud	Maid	26-Nov-1942	26-Nov-1942	Donau	1-Dec-1942	21	Auschwitz	
Scharff	Julius	2-Sep-1914	Hønefoss	Buskerud	Sales agent	26-Oct-1942	26-Nov-1942	Donau	14-Jan-1943	28	Auschwitz	79214
Scharff	Lisa	28-Apr-1919	Hønefoss	Buskerud	Homemaker	26-Nov-1942	26-Nov-1942	Donau	1-Dec-1942	23	Auschwitz	
Scharff	Mina	15-Feb-1914	Oslo	Oslo	Maid	26-Nov-1942	26-Nov-1942	Donau	1-Dec-1942	28	Auschwitz	
Schechter	Josef	2-Jul-1892	Bergen	Hordaland	Music conductor	26-Oct-1942	26-Nov-1942	Donau	Jan 43	50	Auschwitz	
Scheer	Benjamin	10-Jul-1900	Bergen	Hordaland	Factory owner	26-Oct-1942	26-Nov-1942	Donau	2-Mar-1943	42	Auschwitz	79240
Scheer	Carl	14-May-1906	Bergen	Hordaland	Factory owner	26-Oct-1942	26-Nov-1942	Donau	7-Jun-1943	37	Auschwitz	79239
Scheer	Fanny	28-Apr-1901	Oslo	Oslo	Factory owner	26-Oct-1942	26-Nov-1942	Donau	1-Dec-1942	41	Auschwitz	
Scheer	Harry	19-Sep-1913	Bergen	Hordaland	Factory owner	26-Oct-1942	26-Nov-1942	Donau	2-Mar-1943	29	Auschwitz	79240
Scheer	Leonard	12-Apr-1919	Oslo	Oslo	Stud.med.	26-Oct-1942	26-Nov-1942	Donau	15-Feb-1943	23	Auschwitz	
Scheer	Olga	15-Jul-1862	Oslo	Oslo	Homemaker	26-Nov-1942	26-Nov-1942	Donau	1-Dec-1942	80	Auschwitz	
Schermann	Charles	31-Dec-1915	Oslo	Oslo	Retail clerk	26-Oct-1942	26-Nov-1942	Donau	15-Feb-1943	27	Auschwitz	
Schermann	Moritz Moses	8-Dec-1889	Oslo	Oslo	Retail clerk	27-Oct-1942	26-Nov-1942	Donau	20-Jan-1943	53	Auschwitz	79217
Schermann	Oskar	19-Jan-1925	Oslo	Oslo	Messenger	26-Oct-1942	26-Nov-1942	Donau	Mar 43	18	Auschwitz	
Schermann	Willy	14-Nov-1918	Oslo	Oslo	Tailor	26-Oct-1942	24-Feb-1943	Gotenland	20-Aug-1943	24	Auschwitz	105392
Schidorsky	Jenny	22-Jun-1882	Trondheim	Sør-Trøndelag	Homemaker	25-Nov-1942	24-Feb-1943	Gotenland	3-Mar-1943	60	Auschwitz	
Schiff	Frieda	20-Dec-1876	Øverskogen	Buskerud	Homemaker	26-Nov-1942	24-Feb-1943	Gotenland	3-Mar-1943	66	Auschwitz	
Schimberg	Moritz	20-Dec-1888	Oslo	Oslo	Tailor	26-Oct-1942	26-Nov-1942	Donau	1-Dec-1942	53	Auschwitz	
Schuchad	Esther	13-Jun-1890	Oslo	Oslo	Seamstress	26-Nov-1942	26-Nov-1942	Donau	1-Dec-1942	52	Auschwitz	
Schulmann	Herman	12-Mar-1917	Oslo	Oslo	Broom binder	26-Oct-1942	26-Nov-1942	Donau		25	Auschwitz	
Schulmann	Jenny	17-Jul-1920	Oslo	Oslo	Retail clerk	26-Nov-1942	26-Nov-1942	Donau	1-Dec-1942	22	Auschwitz	
Schuster	Anna	15-Jan-1904	Nakkerud	Buskerud	Homemaker	12-Dec-1942	15-Feb-1943	Other route		39	Auschwitz	
Schuster	Johann	31-Dec-1926	Nakkerud	Buskerud	Pupil	12-Dec-1942	15-Feb-1943	Other route		16	Auschwitz	
Schuster	Rosa	11-Aug-1930	Nakkerud	Buskerud	Pupil	12-Dec-1942	15-Feb-1943	Other route		12	Auschwitz	
Seelig	Rudolf	17-Feb-1921	Oslo	Oslo	Tailor	2-Oct-1941	26-Nov-1942	Monte Rosa	17-Feb-1943	21	Auschwitz	
Segal	Frida	29-Nov-1882	Oslo	Oslo	Homemaker	15-Jan-1943	15-Feb-1943	Other route	9-Apr-1944	61	Internment camp, France	
**Segal**	**Leopold**	31-Mar-1922	Oslo	Oslo		26-Oct-1942	15-Feb-1943	Other route	Survived			
**Segal**	**Lisa**	18-Mar-1924	Oslo	Oslo		15-Jan-1943	15-Feb-1943	Other route	Survived			
Segal	Miriam	27-Jan-1917	Oslo	Oslo	Spinner	26-Nov-1942	26-Nov-1942	Donau	1-Dec-1942	25	Auschwitz	
Segal	Tonny	27-Oct-1918	Oslo	Oslo	Factory worker	26-Oct-1942	26-Nov-1942	Donau	1-Dec-1942	24	Auschwitz	
Seligmann	Erik Otto	19-Sep-1916	Oslo	Oslo	Ad drawer	26-Oct-1942	26-Nov-1942	Donau		26	Auschwitz	105025
Seligmann	Luise B.	15-Mar-1893	Oslo	Oslo	Homemaker	26-Nov-1942	26-Nov-1942	Donau	1-Dec-1942	49	Auschwitz	
Seligmann	Richard S	1-Jul-1884	Oslo	Oslo	Editor	26-Oct-1942	26-Nov-1942	Donau	1-Dec-1942	58	Auschwitz	
Seligmann	RolfS.	23-Sep-1920	Oslo	Oslo	Secretary	26-Oct-1942	26-Nov-1942	Donau		22	Auschwitz	
Selikowitz	Hannah	16-Jul-1901	Oslo	Oslo	Factory owner		26-Nov-1942	Donau	1-Dec-1942	41	Auschwitz	
Selikowitz	Sara	20-Apr-1880	Oslo	Oslo	Homemaker	26-Nov-1942	26-Nov-1942	Donau	1-Dec-1942	62	Auschwitz	
Senderowitz	Essayas	25-Dec-1885	Oslo	Oslo	Tobacco worker	26-Oct-1942	24-Feb-1943	Gotenland	3-Mar-1943	57	Auschwitz	
Senderowitz	Rakel	13-Oct-1883	Oslo	Oslo	Homemaker	26-Nov-1942	26-Nov-1942	Donau	1-Dec-1942	59	Auschwitz	
Shotland	Eva	29-Dec-1908	Tromsø	Troms	Retail clerk	26-Nov-1942	24-Feb-1943	Gotenland	3-Mar-1943	34	Auschwitz	
Shotland	Eva	1-Nov-1909	Harstad	Troms	Homemaker	26-Nov-1942	24-Feb-1943	Gotenland	3-Mar-1943	33	Auschwitz	
Shotland	Harry Simon	24-Aug-1941	Harstad	Troms	Child	26-Nov-1942	24-Feb-1943	Gotenland	3-Mar-1943	1	Auschwitz	
Shotland	Isak	24-Jun-1892	Mosjøen	Nordland	Factory owner	26-Oct-1942	26-Nov-1942	Donau		50	Auschwitz	
Shotland	Isak	20-Mar-1907	Harstad	Troms	Merchant	26-Oct-1942	26-Nov-1942	Donau	29-Jan-1943	35	Auschwitz	
Shotland	Meyer Leib	1-Aug-1878	Tromsø	Troms	Merchant	26-Oct-1942	24-Feb-1943	Gotenland	3-Mar-1943	64	Auschwitz	
Shotland	Rosa	28-Jan-1878	Tromsø	Troms	Homemaker	26-Nov-1942	24-Feb-1943	Gotenland	3-Mar-1943	65	Auschwitz	
Shotland	Salomon	18-May-1902	Tromsø	Troms	Bookkeeper	18-Jun-1941	26-Nov-1942	Monte Rosa	11-Feb-1943	40	Auschwitz	
Siew	Joseph	2-Apr-1876	Oslo	Oslo	Sales agent	26-Oct-1942	26-Nov-1942	Donau	1-Dec-1942	66	Auschwitz	
Siew	Sarah	14-Jun-1890	Oslo	Oslo	Seamstress	26-Nov-1942	26-Nov-1942	Donau	1-Dec-1942	52	Auschwitz	
Silber	Felix	15-Jun-1875	Oslo	Oslo		26-Oct-1942	26-Nov-1942	Donau	1-Dec-1942	67	Auschwitz	
Silber	Feodossi	3-Jul-1876	Oslo	Oslo	Homemaker	26-Nov-1942	26-Nov-1942	Donau	1-Dec-1942	66	Auschwitz	
Smith	Bertha	6-Oct-1904	Oslo	Oslo	Homemaker	26-Nov-1942	26-Nov-1942	Donau	1-Dec-1942	38	Auschwitz	
Smith	Finn	6-Sep-1911	Oslo	Oslo	Hair stylist	26-Oct-1942	26-Nov-1942	Donau	Feb 43	31	Auschwitz	
Smith	Hans Lauritz	20-Apr-1877	Oslo	Oslo	Merchant	26-Nov-1942	26-Nov-1942	Donau	1-Dec-1942	65	Auschwitz	
Smith	Herman	13-Feb-1907	Tromsø	Troms	Merchant	17-Jun-1941	26-Nov-1942	Monte Rosa	13-Feb-1943	36	Auschwitz	
Smith	Israel	25-Oct-1882	Strømmen	Akershus	Worker	27-Oct-1942	26-Nov-1942	Donau	1-Dec-1942	60	Auschwitz	
Spielmann	Paul Israel	11-Nov-1904	Nakkerud	Buskerud	Roofer	26-Oct-1942	26-Nov-1942	Donau	3-Feb-1943	38		79226
Springmann	Sofie	28-Feb-1896	Oslo	Oslo	Stenographer	26-Nov-1942	26-Nov-1942	Donau	1-Dec-1942	46		
**Stanning**	**Jacques**		Stavanger	Rogaland	Ethnologist	Fall of 1940	March 1942	Other route	Survived			
Steinfeld	Israel	30-May-1889	Ålesund	Møre og Romsdal	Merchant	26-Oct-1942	26-Nov-1942	Monte Rosa	15-May-1943	53	Auschwitz	
Steinfeld	Lea	26-Oct-1896	Ålesund	Møre og Romsdal	Homemaker	26-Nov-1942	24-Feb-1943	Gotenland	3-Mar-1943	46	Auschwitz	
Steinfeld	Morten	7-Jul-1925	Ålesund	Møre og Romsdal	Pupil	26-Nov-1942	24-Feb-1943	Gotenland	3-Mar-1943	17	Auschwitz	
Steinfeld	Reidun	8-Nov-1922	Ålesund	Møre og Romsdal	Pupil	26-Nov-1942	24-Feb-1943	Gotenland	3-Mar-1943	20	Auschwitz	
Steinmann	Harry	10-Jan-1920	Oslo	Oslo	Retail clerk	26-Oct-1942	26-Nov-1942	Donau	Jan 43	22	Auschwitz	79232
**Steinmann**	**Samuel**	24-Aug-1923	Oslo	Oslo	High school student	26-Oct-1942	26-Nov-1942	Donau	Survived		Auschwitz	79231
Steinsapir	Arne	20-Oct-1937	Oslo	Oslo	Child	26-Nov-1942	26-Nov-1942	Donau	1-Dec-1942	5	Auschwitz	
Steinsapir	Fanny	7-Oct-1907	Oslo	Oslo	Homemaker	26-Nov-1942	26-Nov-1942	Donau	1-Dec-1942	35	Auschwitz	
Steinsapir	Judit	19-Sep-1875	Oslo	Oslo	Homemaker	26-Nov-1942	26-Nov-1942	Donau	1-Dec-1942	67	Auschwitz	
Steinsapir	Leopold	15-May-1869	Oslo	Oslo	Merchant	26-Nov-1942	26-Nov-1942	Donau	1-Dec-1942	73	Auschwitz	
Steinsapir	Moritz	24-Dec-1906	Oslo	Oslo	Tobacco worker	26-Oct-1942	26-Nov-1942	Donau	18-Jan-1943	36	Auschwitz	79216
Steinsapir	Robert	1-Oct-1909	Oslo	Oslo	Chauffeur	26-Oct-1942	26-Nov-1942	Donau	16-Feb-1943	33	Auschwitz	
Stiris	Markus	10-Apr-1922	Oslo	Oslo	Office clerk	26-Oct-1942	26-Nov-1942	Donau	Jan 43	20	Auschwitz	79227
Taglicht	Tibor	29-Nov-1929	Nesjestranda in Molde	Møre og Romsdal	Pupil	11-Feb-1943	24-Feb-1943	Gotenland	3-Mar-1943	13	Auschwitz	
Taglicht	Vera	22-Sep-1932	Nesjestranda in Molde	Møre og Romsdal	Pupil	11-Feb-1943	24-Feb-1943	Gotenland	3-Mar-1943	10	Auschwitz	
Tomsinsky	Salomon	16-Feb-1891	Oslo	Oslo	Sales agent	27-Oct-1942	26-Nov-1942	Donau	1-Dec-1942	51		
Trebitsch	Cajoline	3-Sep-1880	Lillehammer	Oppland	Homemaker		24-Feb-1943	Gotenland	3-Mar-1943	62	Auschwitz	
Türkheimer	Clara	13-Apr-1879	Ålvik in Hardanger	Hordaland	Homemaker	26-Nov-1942	24-Feb-1943	Gotenland	3-Mar-1943	63	Auschwitz	
Türkheimer	Fritz Josef	27-Feb-1907	Ålvik in Hardanger	Hordaland	Journalist	26-Oct-1942	26-Nov-1942	Donau	14-Jan-1943	35	Auschwitz	79243
Ullmann	Isak	15-Aug-1892	Moss	Østfold	Merchant	4-Dec-1941	21-May-1942	Other route	1-Oct-1942	50	Lublin	
Ullmann	Paul	27-Dec-1916	Moss	Østfold	Merchant	4-Dec-1942	21-May-1942	Other route	1-Oct-1942	25	Lublin	
Ullmann	Ruben	13-Dec-1918	Moss	Østfold	Medical student	4-Dec-1941	21-May-1942	Other route	30-Sep-1942	23	Sachsenhausen	
Valner	Herman	9-Nov-1888	Oslo	Oslo	Merchant	26-Sep-1942	20-Nov-1942	Monte Rosa	20-Dec-1942	54	Auschwitz	
Wainer	Johny	15-Apr-1920	Oslo	Oslo	Tool maker	26-Oct-1942	26-Nov-1942	Donau	23-Jan-1943	22	Auschwitz	79244
Wainer	Lina Rakel	17-Oct-1895	Oslo	Oslo	Homemaker	26-Oct-1942	26-Nov-1942	Donau	1-Dec-1942	47	Auschwitz	
Wainer	Pauli (Anna)	5-May-1925	Oslo	Oslo	Pupil	26-Nov-1942	26-Nov-1942	Donau	1-Dec-1942	17	Auschwitz	
Wainer	Salomon	1-Oct-1893	Oslo	Oslo	Merchant	26-Oct-1942	24-Feb-1943	Gotenland	11-Apr-1943	49	Auschwitz	105411
Watchman	Arthur	19-Jun-1926	Oslo	Oslo	Pupil	26-Oct-1942	26-Nov-1942	Donau	1-Dec-1942	16	Auschwitz	
Watchman	Florence	24-Apr-1892	Oslo	Oslo	Homemaker	26-Nov-1942	26-Nov-1942	Donau	1-Dec-1942	50	Auschwitz	
Watchman	Philip	8-Jun-1885	Oslo	Oslo	Antique dealer		26-Nov-1942	Donau	1-Dec-1942	57	Auschwitz	
Weinberg	Josef	15-Aug-1885	Oslo	Oslo	Merchant	2-Sep-1942	20-Nov-1942	Monte Rosa	22-Jan-1943	57	Auschwitz	
Weiner	Ida	1-Mar-1879	Oslo	Oslo	Homemaker	26-Nov-1942	24-Feb-1943	Gotenland	3-Mar-1943	64	Auschwitz	
Weinstein	Robert	24-Nov-1901	Nesjestranda in Molde	Møre og Romsdal	Factory owner	16-Mar-1942	24-Feb-1943	Gotenland	7-Aug-1943	41	Warsaw	105412
Weinstock	Bertha	3-Apr-1895	Oslo	Oslo	Merchant	26-Nov-1942	26-Nov-1942	Donau	1-Dec-1942	47	Auschwitz	
Weinstock	Fanny	11-Aug-1893	Oslo	Oslo	Ekspeditrise	26-Nov-1942	26-Nov-1942	Donau	1-Dec-1942	49	Auschwitz	
Weinstock	Jenny	20-Jun-1938	Oslo	Oslo	Child	26-Nov-1942	26-Nov-1942	Donau	1-Dec-1942	4	Auschwitz	
Weinstock	Josef	21-Oct-1908	Oslo	Oslo	Sales agent	26-Oct-1942	26-Nov-1942	Donau		34	Auschwitz	79246
Weinstock	Sara	12-Dec-1909	Oslo	Oslo	Homemaker	26-Nov-1942	26-Nov-1942	Donau	1-Dec-1942	32	Auschwitz	
Weiss	Stephan	7-Apr-1903	Oslo	Oslo		26-Oct-1942	26-Nov-1942	Donau	31-Jan-1943	39	Auschwitz	79247
Werner	Friedrich	28-Mar-1873	Oslo	Oslo		26-Oct-1942	26-Nov-1942	Donau	1-Dec-1942	69	Auschwitz	
Wilk	Bernhard	5-Oct-1883	Oslo	Oslo	Sales agent	26-Oct-1942	26-Nov-1942	Donau	1-Dec-1942	59	Auschwitz	
Wolf	Paul	15-Oct-1885	Oslo	Oslo	Cabinetmaker	26-Nov-1942	26-Nov-1942	Donau	1-Dec-1942	57	Auschwitz	
**Wolfberg**	**Leif (Leiba)**	10-Oct-1914	Oslo	Oslo	Violinist	3-Apr-1942	26-Nov-1942	Monte Rosa	Survived			81952
Wolkoff	Elias	6-Mar-1923	Oslo	Oslo	Mason	27-Oct-1942	26-Nov-1942	Donau	19-Jan-1943	19	Auschwitz	79248
Wulff	Doris	19-Feb-1938	Oslo	Oslo	Child	26-Nov-1942	26-Nov-1942	Donau	1-Dec-1942	4	Auschwitz	
Wulff	Harry	24-Oct-1908	Oslo	Oslo	Businessman	26-Oct-1942	26-Nov-1942	Donau	22-Mar-1943	34	Auschwitz	79245
Wulff	Olga	17-Apr-1911	Oslo	Oslo	Homemaker	26-Nov-1942	26-Nov-1942	Donau	1-Dec-1942	31	Auschwitz	
Zilsel	Martin Heinz	22-Aug-1917	Oslo	Oslo	Photographer	26-Oct-1942	26-Nov-1942	Donau	14-Jan-1943	25	Auschwitz	
Zuckmann	Frida	24-Dec-1888	Trondheim	Sør-Trøndelag		26-Nov-1942	24-Feb-1943	Gotenland	3-Mar-1943	54	Auschwitz	

== Sources ==
- Mendelsohn, Oskar (1986). Jødenes historie i Norge gjennom 300 år - Bind 2 1940-1985 (in Norwegian) (2nd ed.). Oslo: Universitetsforlaget. pp. 334–360. ISBN 82-00-02524-1.
- Ottosen, Kristian (1994). "Vedlegg 1". I slik en natt; historien om deportasjonen av jøder fra Norge (in Norwegian). Oslo: Aschehoug. pp. 334–360. ISBN 82-03-26049-7.
- Søbye, Espen (2003). Kathe, alltid vært i Norge (in Norwegian). Oslo: Oktober. ISBN 9788270949267.
- Komissar, Vera (1992). Nådetid - norske jøder på flukt (in Norwegian). Oslo: Aschehoug. ISBN 82-03-17170-2.
- Berman, Irene Levin (2008). "Vi skal plukke poteter" - Flukten fra Holocaust (in Norwegian). Oslo: Orion. ISBN 978-82-458-0865-0.
