= Welhaven =

Welhaven is a protected Norwegian surname. Notable people with the surname include:

- Elisabeth Welhaven (1815–1901), Norwegian writer
- Hjalmar Welhaven (1850–1922), Norwegian architect, palace manager, and sportsman
- Johan Sebastian Welhaven (1807–1873), Norwegian writer, poet, critic and art theorist
- Kristian Welhaven (1883–1975), Norwegian police chief
- Sigri Welhaven (1894–1991), Norwegian sculptor
- Johan Ernst Welhaven (1775–1828), Norwegian priest and father of Johan Sebastian Welhaven.
