= Ragnhild Rød =

Norwegian politician

Ragnhild Rød, née Ragnhild Gunnerson Welhaven (22 August 1884 – 22 October 1967) was a Norwegian politician for the Conservative Party.

== Early life ==
Rød was born in Kristiania as a daughter of clergyman Sven Rudolf Gunnerson (1844–1904) and Elise Margrethe Cammermeyer Welhaven (1850–1936). Her father had americanized his name from Gundersen to Gunnerson, while working as a theologian in the United States. Her maternal grandmother was Anthone Johanne Holmboe, a daughter of Michael Wide Holmboe. As such Ragnhild Rød was a great-great-granddaughter of Jens Holmboe. Her maternal grandfather was Johan Ernst Welhaven Jr. (1818–1883), a brother of Maren, Elisabeth and Johan Sebastian Welhaven. Ragnhild Rød was a second cousin of her father's cousin's daughter Sigri Welhaven.

== Career ==
Rød was a member of Halden city council from 1931 to 1940, and also after the Second World War. She was a member of the school board from 1926 to 1928 and 1932 to 1938, and of the cinematographer's board from 1938 to 1940 and after the war. She was a deputy representative to the Parliament of Norway from the Market towns of Østfold and Akershus counties during the term 1937–1945, and met briefly in the place of Robert Rafn.
