= Astri Welhaven Heiberg =

Norwegian painter (1881–1967)

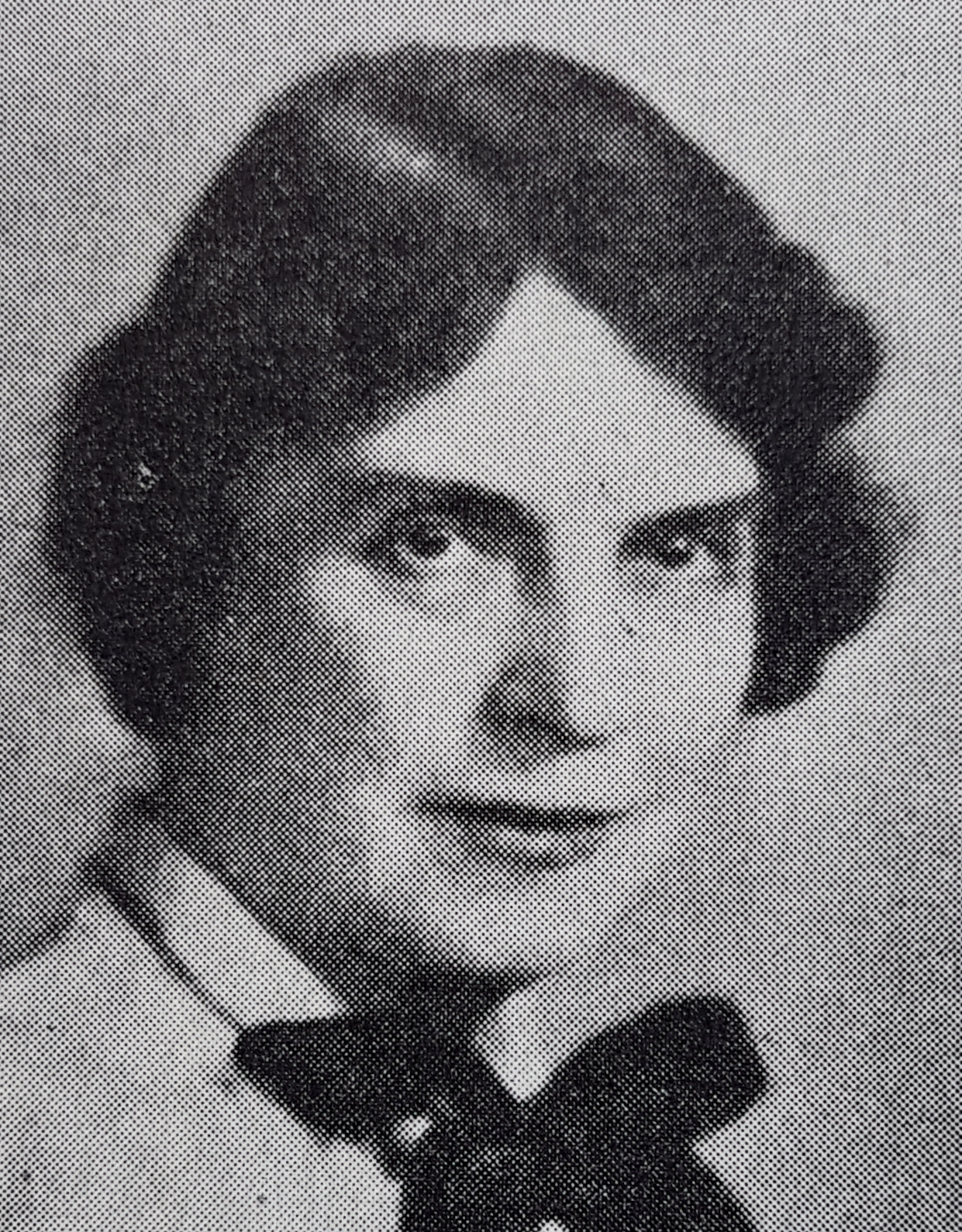
- Born: 14 December 1881; Oslo, Norway
- Died: 26 May 1967 (aged 85); Oslo, Norway
- Known for: Painting
- Spouse: Christen Fritzner Heiberg (m. 1907)
- Children: 1
- Father: Hjalmar Welhaven
- Relatives: Sigri Welhaven (sister); Harriet Backer (aunt)

Astri Welhaven Heiberg (14 December 1881 – 26 May 1967) was a Norwegian painter, best known for her portraits of female nudes and landscapes.

== Biography ==
=== Family ===
Welhaven Heiberg was born in Kristiania into a family with close relationships with key people in Norwegian cultural life. Her sister Sigri Welhaven was a sculptor.

Her father, Hjalmar Welhaven (1850–1922), was the second-oldest son of the poet Johan Sebastian Welhaven (1807–1873) and his Danish wife Josephine Angelica Bidoulac (1812–1866). Johan Sebastian Welhaven's father, Johan Ernst Welhaven (1775–1828), was a priest, who served among other locations at St. George's Church in Bergen, which was a church and hospital for the lepers in the district. Hjalmar Welhaven was an architect, and designed wooden buildings and workers' homes in Kristiania. He is best known for the house he designed for Fridtjof Nansen, Polhøgda (1900–02) in the Fornebu area, built of stone. In 1883 he became the castle manager for Oscar II.

Her mother was painter Margrethe Backer Welhaven (1851–1940), who was employed as the maid of the Castle from 1889 to 1921. She and her three older sisters were involved in culture. Harriet Backer (1845–1932) was the second-oldest and ranks among Norway's greatest painters. Another sister was the pianist and composer Agathe Backer (1847–1907, married name Agathe Backer Grøndahl), remembered for her piano pieces and songs. Inga Agathe (1842–1915) was the oldest sister and a talented singer. Like her sister Harriet, Margrethe Backer was interested in painting. She studied under Vilhelm Kyhn in Copenhagen and also at Knud Bergslien's painting school in Kristiania.

=== Training and marriage ===
Astri Welhaven was taught by her aunt, Harriet Backer, from 1902 to 1907. Backer operated a painting school in Kristiania for almost 20 years around the turn of the century. During the years that Astri Welhaven was a student with Harriet Backer, she gained much experience in painting nudes. In addition, she adopted her aunt's strict discipline and work ethic.

In November 1907, Astri Welhaven married Christen Fritzner Heiberg (1878–1943), an older brother of the painter and Henri Matisse's student Jean Heiberg. The newlyweds moved to New York shortly after, where Christen Heiberg worked as an architect. Astri Welhaven Heiberg gave birth to her only child, Hjalmar Welhaven Heiberg, in New York in the fall of 1910. Astri's sister Sigri was married to Jean Heiberg from 1913 to 1920.

=== Debut ===
In the fall of 1912, Welhaven Heiberg debuted at the Autumn Exhibition with a portrait. Harriet Backer is said to have advised her not to make her debut too early because she did not want her niece to exhibit until she had a solid foundation. After her debut in 1912, Welhaven Heiberg had works accepted for the Autumn Exhibition eight times over the next ten years, sometimes with up to four or five of her works. She received relatively good reviews in the press, where some expressed hopes for her future artistic work.

Astri Welhaven Heiberg gained some recognition in the years after her debut. In 1916 and 1917 she received the Henrichsen Grant, which she applied for with recommendations from Jens Thiis and Harriet Backer. She received the grant as the only painter for both years. Some sources indicate that she also received the A. C. Houen Grant in the 1920s. This cannot be documented, but it also cannot be ruled out because it is very likely that a travel scholarship allowed her to make her long study visit to Paris in 1924.

== Art ==
Welhaven Heiberg had two separate exhibitions, both at the Blomqvist auction house, in 1919 and 1925. The National Gallery purchased the painting Våraften i Asker (Spring Evening in Asker) from her first solo exhibition. At the Autumn Exhibition in 1919, I haven (In the Garden) was purchased for the collection. Welhaven Heiberg participated in several Scandinavian group exhibitions, including the anniversary exhibition in Gothenburg in 1923. Other international group exhibitions include the Norwegian exhibition in Riga in 1934, International Women Painters (New York, 1939), and Contemporary European Women Painters (London, 1947). She is represented with works in most Norwegian public collections, including the Bergen Art Museum, Lillehammer Art Museum, Southern Norway Art Museum, and Trondheim Art Museum.

Most striking are her paintings of female nudes in landscapes, known as uteakter (outdoor nudes). By 1922 she had probably painted 12 such motifs. During the 1920s, Welhaven Heiberg increasingly turned to painting commissioned portraits. Over the years she undertook several major assignments. She painted King Haakon VII, Crown Princess Märtha, and the crown prince couple's three children, among others. From 1916 to 1924, Welhaven Heiberg lived in Asker. Despite choosing to live in Oslo after 1924, she remained in touch with Asker all her life. Welhaven Heiberg was active as a painter until her last year of life, and she took part in the Autumn Exhibition many times, for the last time in 1961 as an 80-year-old. After this, she exhibited exclusively in Asker. Of Welhaven Heiberg's production, around 150 paintings can be documented and dated to the period between 1907 and 1966. There is reason to believe that many of her paintings are in private collections, and that her total production is greater than what can currently be documented.
