= Kristian Welhaven =

Norwegian police chief (1883–1975)

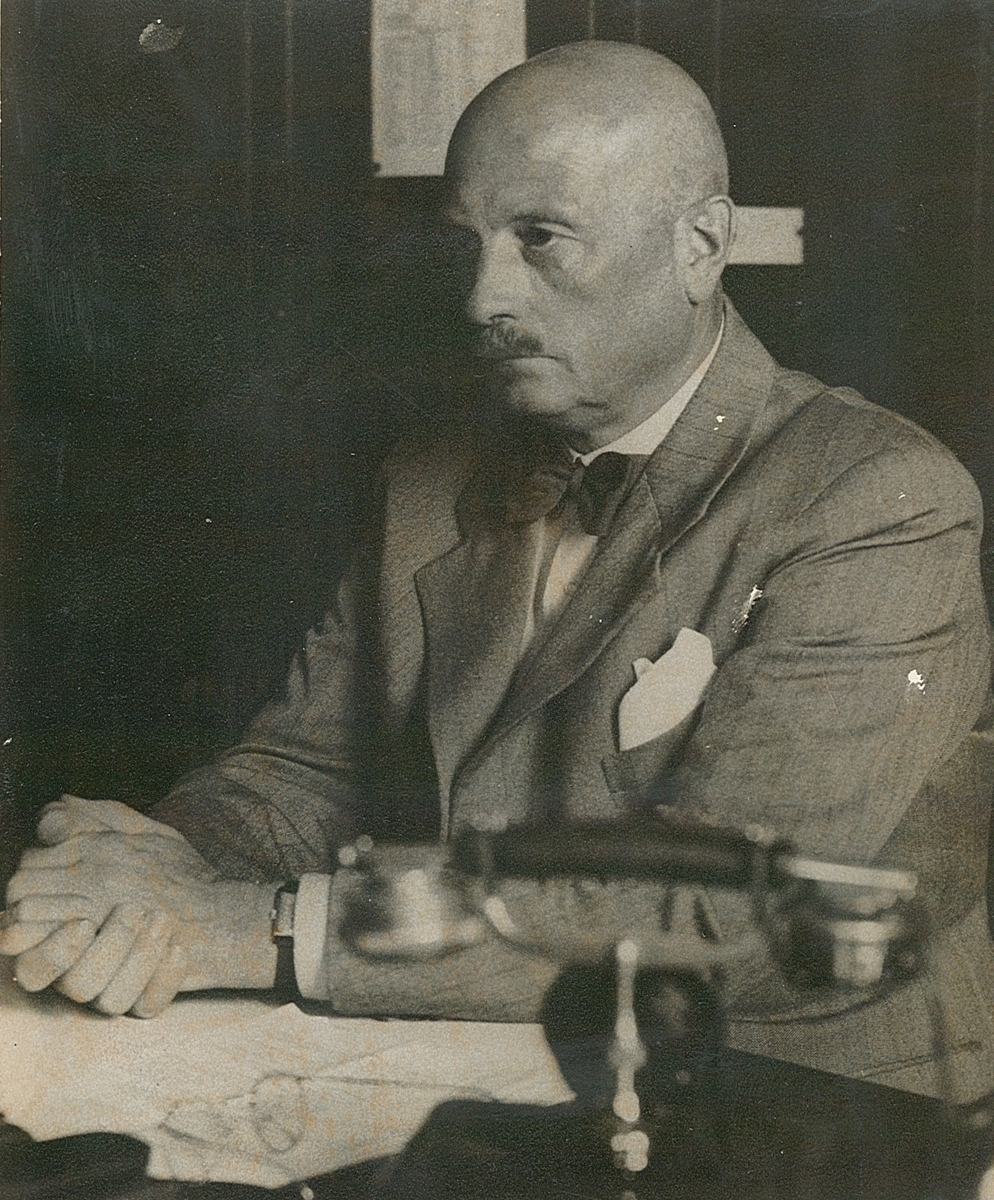
- Kristian Welhaven, ca. 1930–40
- Born: 11 October 1883; Kristiania
- Died: 27 July 1975 (aged 91); Oslo
- Occupations: Chief of Police; Jurist
- Known for: Chief of Police in Oslo for 27 years
- Spouse: Margit Aagaard (m. 1917)
- Relatives: Johan Sebastian Welhaven (uncle); Maren Sars (aunt); Elisabeth Welhaven (aunt); Hjalmar Welhaven (cousin); Ernst Sars (cousin); Georg Ossian Sars (cousin); Eva Nansen (cousin)
- Awards: (Norway) Commander of the Royal Norwegian Order of St. Olav (Denmark) Commander of the Order of Dannebrog (Sweden) Order of Vasa (Sweden) Order of the Polar Star

Kristian Welhaven (11 October 1883 – 27 July 1975) was a Norwegian police officer. He was chief of police of Oslo for 27 years, from 1927 to 1954. He was a leading force in establishing an organized Norwegian intelligence service before World War II, and in re-establishing it after the war. During the war years Welhaven was arrested by the Germans and imprisoned in both Norway and Germany, before spending the remainder of the war as a civilian internee in Bavaria.

== Personal life ==
Welhaven was born in Kristiania as the son of parish priest Johan Andreas Welhaven (1825–1893) and his wife Gerda Kathinka Elisabeth Hansen (1857–1948). He married Margit Aagaard on 12 October 1917 in Kristiania. He was a nephew of poet Johan Sebastian Welhaven, writer Elisabeth Welhaven and culture personality Maren Sars (married to Michael Sars, and mother of Georg Ossian Sars, Ernst Sars and Eva Nansen). In addition to these three he was a first cousin of Hjalmar Welhaven. He died in Oslo in 1975.

== Pre-war career ==
Welhaven finished his secondary education at the Kristiania Cathedral School in 1901. He studied at the Norwegian Military Academy (Norwegian: Krigsskolen) from 1901 to 1902, and then law at the Royal Frederick University, graduating with the cand.jur. degree in 1907. He worked in Tana Municipality, Tromsø Municipality, and the city of Kristiania until he was appointed Chief of Police in Rjukan in 1916. He became Chief of Police of Oslo in 1927, and held this position until 1954, except for the war years.

He was chairman of Statens Idrettsråd from 1936 to 1940.

One of Welhaven's keen interests was surveillance and intelligence gathering, and he was central in establishing the Oslo police force's surveillance department before the war. Amongst the people that Welhaven wanted to keep under surveillance was the Norwegian communist Viggo Hansteen. Another group deemed as worthy of surveillance was the Romani, Welhaven responding to a pre-war request from the Gypsy registry in Vienna that as soon as a national registry had been established in Norway it would be sent to Vienna.

== World War II ==
=== Early phase ===
At the outbreak of World War II Welhaven was made head of a commission set up to plan the evacuation of the population of Oslo in case of war. When the German invasion of Norway came on 9 April 1940, attempts were made to evacuate people, but in the chaos of the invasion the organization fell through and at 1300hrs Welhaven called off the evacuation work. At the same time German troops entered Oslo after having captured Fornebu Airport in an airborne operation, their seaborne attack having been blunted at the battle of Drøbak Sound early that morning. Welhaven had been contacted by Minister of Justice and the Police Terje Wold in the early hours of 9 April and had been authorized to use all municipal powers to prepare Oslo for war, especially in case of bombing. Welhaven was given responsibility for aiding the civilian population in case of bombing, and was tasked with taking over civilian power in the capital in case the government had to evacuate Oslo. Wold had also told Welhaven to arrest Norwegian Fascist leader Vidkun Quisling if the opportunity presented itself. At around noon on 9 April, Wold ordered Welhaven to surrender the city to the Germans. After the German occupation of Oslo Welhaven was asked by the German envoy Curt Bräuer to telephone the Norwegian government and try to organize a meeting between Bräuer and King Haakon VII personally to negotiate for peace. Bräuer got his meeting with the king, but it led nowhere and the fighting continued. Welhaven also facilitated contact between the local authorities in Oslo and Bräuer, and provided a police escort and support for bishop Eivind Berggrav during his later infamous journey to Krokskogen outside Oslo to encourage irregular Norwegian forces to lay down their arms. Welhaven, together with Director of Public Prosecutions Haakon Sund and Mayor of Oslo Trygve Nilsen, also signed radio broadcast announcements on 12 April which quoted the Hague Conventions on the laws of war. The same announcements warned that francs-tireurs taking part in irregular fighting would be punishable by death in a court-martial. The concern of Welhaven and the other dignitaries was that Norwegians would not know the regulations of the Hague Conventions nor understand the concept of being francs-tireurs, and be then court martialled by the Germans Among Welhaven's other actions following the German invasion was to order the Norwegian surveillance archives destroyed by burning.

=== Under German occupation ===
During the occupation, Welhaven refused to cooperate with the German occupiers and the Norwegian Nazi collaborators. Welhaven, together with Supreme Court Justice Paal Berg, Oslo mayor Trygve Nilsen and Commissioner of finance Hartmann approached the German authorities to have Quisling's government removed. This led to the establishment of the Administrative Council on 15 April and the temporary removal of Quisling's government. Welhaven was removed from his position by the Germans 23 September 1940, and replaced with the Nazi-loyal Bernhard Askvig. He was arrested by the Germans 12 September 1941 and incarcerated at the Grini concentration camp until 19 January 1943. He was transferred to Germany where he was kept in custody from 1943 to 1945, first in the Gestapo prison in Prinz-Albrecht-Straße in Berlin, and later interned in Landsberg am Lech, Bavaria with his wife Margit and daughter Gerda. Didrik Arup Seip and his wife, who was in a similar situation, visited the Welhaven family in Landsberg in 1943. In March 1945 the family was brought to Gross Kreutz outside Berlin by Johan Bernhard Hjort, whose family had also been interned in Germany during the war years, and in April they were brought to Sweden as part of the White Buses operation.

"It has been my life to be the chief of this corps!
(Welhaven at the day of his retirement as the chief of the Oslo police force.). (Note: Norwegian: Det har vært mitt liv å være sjef for dette korps!)"

== Post-war career ==
After World War II Welhaven worked with rebuilding the police force of Oslo, being its leader until his retirement in 1954. Welhaven used his influence to ensure that the post-war purge of the Norwegian police force was as gentle as possible.

In addition to ordinary police work he was instrumental in the establishment of a national surveillance organization. In the early post-war days surveillance operations were carried out by individuals outside of government control, and by Western intelligence services. The national organization that Welhaven built together with chief of surveillance Asbjørn Bryhn was based around the Oslo police service and led by Welhaven himself.

He was decorated as a Commander of the Royal Norwegian Order of St. Olav in 1947, and also of the Danish Order of Dannebrog and the Swedish Order of Vasa and Order of the Polar Star.
