= Elisabeth Welhaven =

Norwegian writer

Elisabeth Cathrine "Lise" Welhaven (6 March 1815 – 26 July 1901) was a Norwegian writer.

== Personal life ==
She was born in Bergen as a daughter of the priest Johan Ernst Welhaven (1775–1828) and Else Margrethe Cammermeyer (1785–1853), the daughter of Johan Sebastian Cammermeyer. She was a sister of Johan Sebastian and Maren Sars (née Welhaven).

She did not marry. Through her sister Maren she was a sister-in-law of priest and professor Michael Sars and an aunt of Ernst Sars, Georg Ossian Sars and Eva Nansen (née Sars) . Through her brother Johan Sebastian she was an aunt of architect Hjalmar Welhaven, and through another brother Johan Andreas she was an aunt of police chief Kristian Welhaven.

== Career ==
She grew up in Bergen, but after her father died when Elisabeth was thirteen, she moved in with Michael and Maren Sars. They first lived in Manger where Michael was a vicar, but in 1854 the family moved to Christiania where Michael had become professor.

The family home in Christiania became a notable meeting place for liberal and intellectual citizens of Norway's capital, and has been called "Christiania's first salon". Welhaven's role in the salon was that of storyteller, and one of the recurring guests, Hartvig Lassen, encouraged her to write them down. He published them in the magazine Skilling-Magazin, and in 1870 some tales were collected and published as the book Fra Staden og Stranden. In 1871 she released Fra gamle Dage. The books were reissued later; the two under one as Fra Staden og Stranden in 1881 and Fortællinger fra det gamle Bergen in 1897. The tales were largely based on her childhood in Bergen.

She died in July 1901, three years after Maren Sars. She was buried at Vår Frelsers gravlund.
