= Maren Sars =

Norwegian socialite (1811–1898)

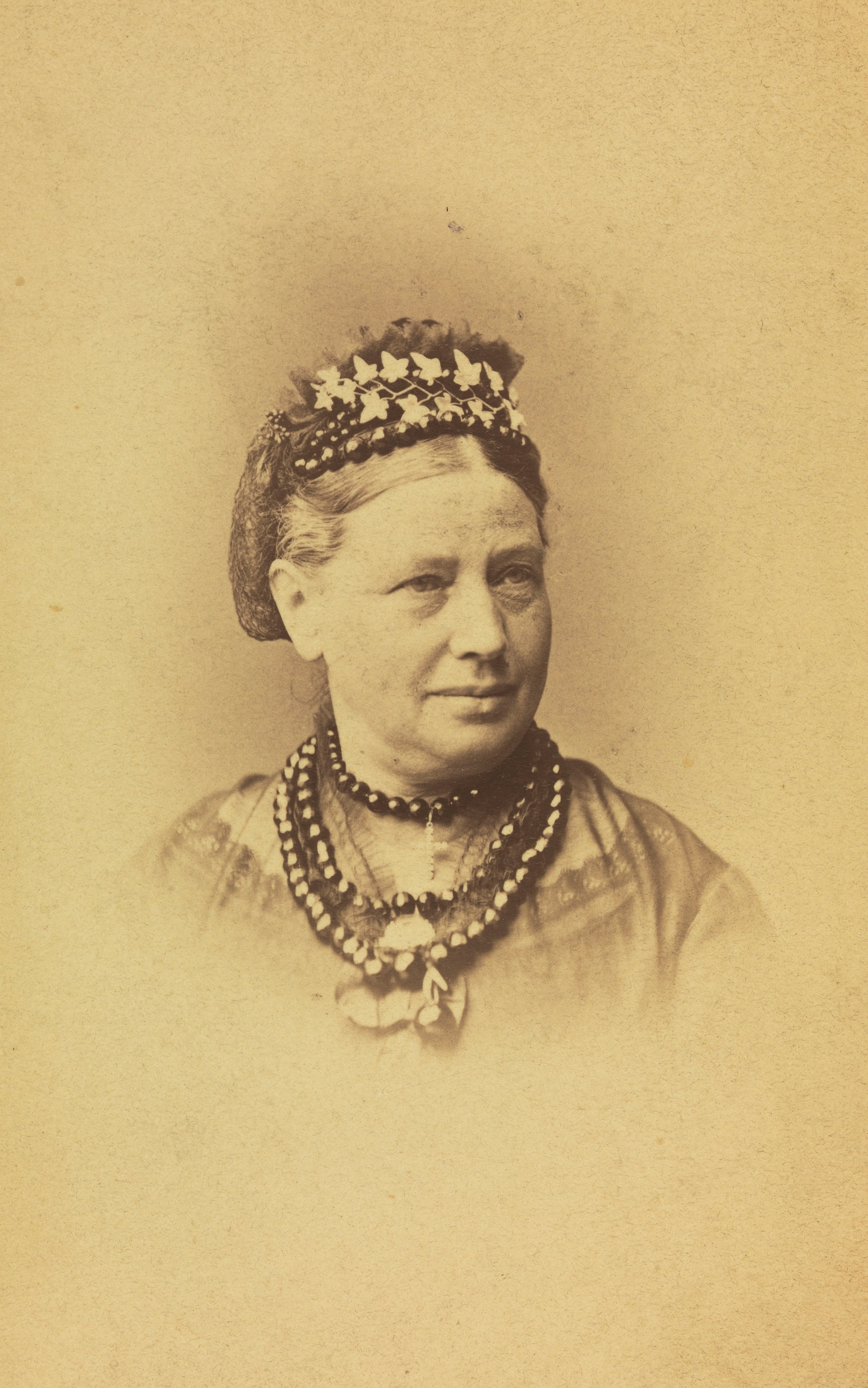
- Born: Maren Cathrine Welhaven; 11 August 1811; Bergen, Norway
- Died: 27 December 1898 (aged 87); Norway
- Occupation: Socialite
- Spouse: Michael Sars
- Children: 14, including: Ernst Sars; Georg Ossian Sars; Eva Nansen
- Relatives: Johan Sebastian Welhaven (brother); Elisabeth Welhaven (sister); Hjalmar Welhaven (nephew); Kristian Welhaven (nephew); Odd Nansen (grandson)

Maren Cathrine Sars (née Welhaven; 17 August 1811 – 27 December 1898) was a Norwegian socialite.

== Personal life ==
She was born in Bergen as a daughter of priest Johan Ernst Welhaven (1775–1828) and Else Margrethe Cammermeyer (1785–1853), the daughter of Johan Sebastian Cammermeyer . She was a sister of Johan Sebastian and Elisabeth "Lise" Welhaven.

In August 1831 in Bergen she married priest and professor Michael Sars (1805–1869). They had several notable children; historian Ernst Sars, zoologist Georg Ossian Sars and singer Eva Nansen. She had a total of fourteen children, nine of whom reached adulthood. Through Eva she was the mother-in-law of Fridtjof Nansen, and through another daughter Mally she was the mother-in-law of Thorvald Lammers. She was also an aunt of Hjalmar and Kristian Welhaven.

== Career ==
She grew up in Bergen, and after marrying she moved to Kinn and later Manger where her husband was a vicar. In 1854, the family moved to Christiania where her husband had become professor.

The family home became a notable meeting place for liberal and intellectual citizens of Norway's capital. It has been called "Christiania's first salon". Among the people who gathered here Ola Thommessen, Lars Holst, Oda Krohg, Mathilde Schjøtt, Hartvig Lassen and Bjørnstjerne Bjørnson. Mally and Eva provided music and song. Her sons Ernst and Ossian even lived with her after Michael died in 1869. Also, her sister Elisabeth lived with her for many years; she was a talented writer and storyteller. Maren Sars contributed with storytelling and being the hostess.

She died in December 1898 from when her heart quit beating. After her death, Maren's daughter Eva, who was married to Fridtjof Nansen, took over the role as hostess for the city's intellectuals, who gathered at their home Godthaab and later Polhøgda.
