= Marit Greve =

Norwegian jurist, book publisher, and politician (1928–2021)

Marit Greve (née Nansen, 8 November 1928 – 26 March 2021) was a Norwegian jurist, book publisher and politician for the Conservative Party.

== Personal life ==
She was a daughter of Kari and Odd Nansen, granddaughter of Eva and Fridtjof Nansen. and a sister of Eigil Nansen.

In 1954 she married historian and diplomat Tim Greve, and was a sister-in-law of Egil Gade Greve. They resided at Fornebu in Bærum, incidentally in the road Fridtjof Nansens vei.

== Career ==
She took the cand.jur. degree in 1955, but spent her career in publishing houses. She was an editor in the encyclopedic department of Aschehougs Forlag, later Kunnskapsforlaget.

She was elected to Bærum municipal council in 1967 and Akershus county council in 1975. She served three terms in the county council. In 1987 she was selected as the first female chair of Bærum Conservative Party, but she only served for one year.

She has also chaired Bærum Hospital and the Fram Committee and held board memberships in the Norwegian Maritime Museum Friends Association and Norges Forsvarsforening. She was also a member of the Norwegian Atlantic Committee and Amnesty International.
