= Tim Greve =

Norwegian historian, biographer, civil servant, diplomat and newspaper editor

- Born: 20 February 1926; Bergen, Norway
- Died: 27 April 1986 (aged 60); Oslo
- Known for: Director, Norwegian Nobel Institute; Secretary, Norwegian Nobel Committee; Chief editor, Verdens Gang; Chair, Broadcasting Council
- Spouse: Marit Nansen
- Relatives: Egil Gade Greve (brother)

Tim Greve (20 February 1926 – 27 April 1986) was a Norwegian historian, biographer, civil servant, diplomat and newspaper editor.

== Personal life ==
Greve was born in Bergen on 20 February 1926, as the son of consul Arent Wittendorph Greve (1892–1950) and Anna Gade (1900–1977). His brother Egil Gade Greve was a notable businessman, and Tim Greve was also a distant descendant of Arent Jansen Greve. In 1954 he married jurist Marit Nansen, daughter of architect Odd Nansen and granddaughter of Eva and Fridtjof Nansen. They resided at Fornebu in Bærum, incidentally in the road Fridtjof Nansens vei.

== Career ==
Greve attended the Nansen Academy, and then studied history at the University of Oslo, graduating in 1952. He was attached to the Ministry of Foreign Affairs from 1951 to 1974. He served as Norwegian delegate to NATO and to the Organisation for Economic Co-operation and Development (OECD), and was later secretary for the Minister of Foreign Affairs, Halvard Lange. Holding office from 1956 to 1960, he was the first political secretary (today known as political advisor) in the Ministry of Foreign Affairs. He was two years at the Norwegian embassy in Bonn, and later served as Secretary for the Standing Committee on Foreign Affairs of the Parliament of Norway. He then returned to the Ministry of Foreign Affairs, as assistant secretary from 1966 to 1967 and deputy under-secretary of state from 1967 to 1974. He served as Director for the Norwegian Nobel Institute from 1974 to 1977 and Secretary for the Norwegian Nobel Committee.

He was chief editor for the newspaper Verdens Gang from 1978 to 1986. In 1978, two long-serving co-editors Oskar Hasselknippe and Vegard Sletten resigned, but Greve had Andreas Norland as a co-editor. During Greve's period as editor-in-chief Verdens Gang became the largest newspaper in Norway, surpassing Aftenposten in 1981. Reportedly, Greve was not genuinely content with this development. He viewed sensationalist journalism, which reached the front page of Verdens Gang now and then, with dismay. From 1982 he chaired the Broadcasting Council. He was succeeded by Helge Seip on 1 January 1986.

Greve wrote several books. His biography of his wife's grandfather, polar explorer and Nobel Peace Prize laureate Fridtjof Nansen, was published in two volumes in 1973 and 1974. He wrote two volumes on World War II in Bergen, Bergen i krig I-II (1978–1979), and a book on espionage in Norway prior to the war, Spionjakt i Norge (1982). From 1982 to his death he was the deputy board chairman of the Stockholm International Peace Research Institute.

Greve was decorated Knight, First Class of the Royal Norwegian Order of St. Olav in 1968 as well as Commander, First Class of the Danish Order of the Dannebrog. He also received the Bundesverdienstkreuz from West Germany. He died in April 1986 in Oslo, from cancer.

== Select bibliography ==
- Det Norske Storting gjennom 150 år III. (1964)
- Riksrevisjonen 1816–1966. (1966)
- Fridtjof Nansen I-II. (1973–1974)
- Bergen i krig I-II. (Bergen, 1978–1979)
- Spionjakt i Norge. (1982)
- Verdenskrig. (Norge i krig, volume 3. Oslo, 1985)
