= Arent Greve =

Norwegian artist, goldsmith, and jeweler

Arent Jansen Greve (also spelled Arndt; 18 October 1733 – 20 December 1808) was a Norwegian jeweler, goldsmith and painter.

Greve was born in Bergen, Norway. He was one of the sons of goldsmith Jan Arentsen Greve (1705–1773) and his wife Maren, née Engelsdorph (1711–1796). He took his goldsmith's education at Fabricius in Copenhagen from 1753. He later traveled extensively in France, German and Italian states to study. He later returned to Bergen, where he acquired burghership in January 1774. In the same year he married a merchant's daughter from Christianssand.

In addition to being a goldsmith, Greve created other sorts of craftings and paintings. Among others he became known for his aquarelles and miniature portraits. He died at his country estate Åstvedt hovedgård in Fana. His writings and art were mostly taken over by the public library, Bergens Museum and West Norway Museum of Decorative Art.

== Personal life ==
He was married to Cecilie Rønnow Bredal (1749–1784). They were the parents of Jan Arentsen Greve (1775–1840). His descendants included Mathias Sigwardt Greve, Bredo Greve, Egil Gade Greve and Tim Greve.
