= Johan Ernst Welhaven =

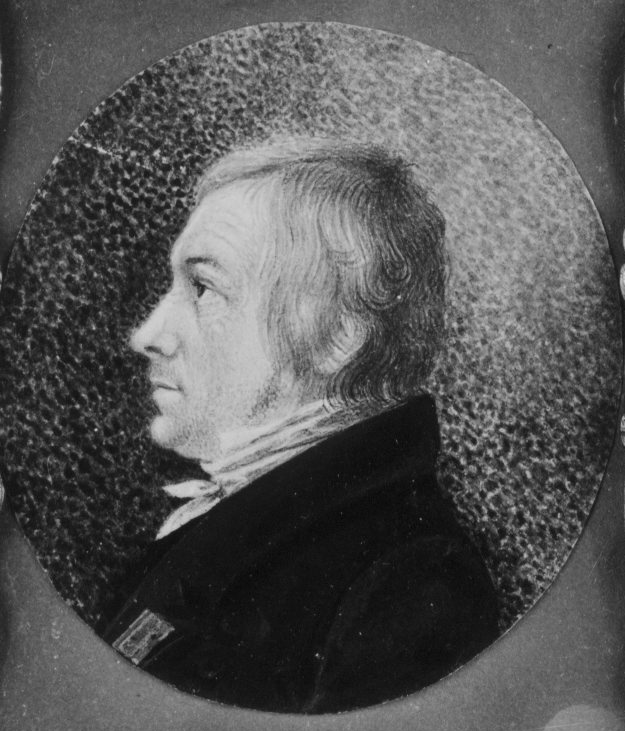
- Johan Ernst Welhaven ca 1823.
- Born: October 30, 1775; Bergen, Norway
- Died: March 10, 1828 (aged 52); Bergen, Norway
- Occupation: Priest
- Known for: Hospital work with lepers

Johan Ernst Welhaven (October 30, 1775 – March 10, 1828) was a well-liked priest at St. George's Hospital Church in Bergen, Norway. He made great efforts to better conditions for the hospital's lepers. He was also the father of the author and poet Johan Sebastian Welhaven.

== Ancestry ==
Welhaven's grandfather, Christopher Welhaven or Welhaver (1725–1783), was a passementerie maker from Ribnitz near the Hanseatic city of Rostock in what is northeastern Germany today. His son, Johan Andreas Welhaven (1748–1811), came to Bergen at the age of 17 as an apprentice at Bryggen. After six years, he became a journeyman. In time, he became a teacher at the German school for the poor established in 1777 in connection with St. Mary's Church in Bergen. Later he also became an organist and sexton at that church. He married Elisabeth Margrethe Woltmann (died 1814), who was also from northeast Germany. Johan Andreas Welhaven appears to have been a hard-working man that, in addition to acquiring the Norwegian language, paid for higher education for his three sons, including Johan Ernst Welhaven.

== Life ==
Welhaven was ordained a priest in 1801, and he spent his entire working life at St. George's Hospital Church, initially as the curate (1801–1807), and later as the parish priest (1808–1827). In 1806 he married Else Margrethe Cammermeyer (1785–1853). Welhaven's father-in-law, Johan Sebastian Cammermeyer (1730–1819), was a Danish curate at Holy Cross Church in Bergen. His mother-in-law, Maren née Heiberg (1742–1812), was also of Danish descent and thereby the aunt of the Danish poet Peter Andreas Heiberg (the father of Johan Ludvig Heiberg).

In 1827/28 Welhaven received a prestigious position at the Bergen Cathedral, but he died just before he was to begin his duties there.

== Descendants ==
Many central figures in Norwegian culture and society are descendants of Johan Ernst Welhaven and Else Margrethe Cammermeyer. Among their eleven children are the three authors Johan Sebastian Welhaven (1807–1873), Elisabeth Welhaven (1815–1901), and Johan Ernst Welhaven Junior (1818–1883). Through their daughter Maren Welhaven (1811–1889), who married Michael Sars (1805–1869), they were the grandparents of the historian Ernst Sars (1835–1917), the singer Eva Nansen (1858–1907), and the zoologist Georg Ossian Sars (1837–1927).
