= Odd Nansen =

Norwegian architect, author, and humanitarian (1901–1973)

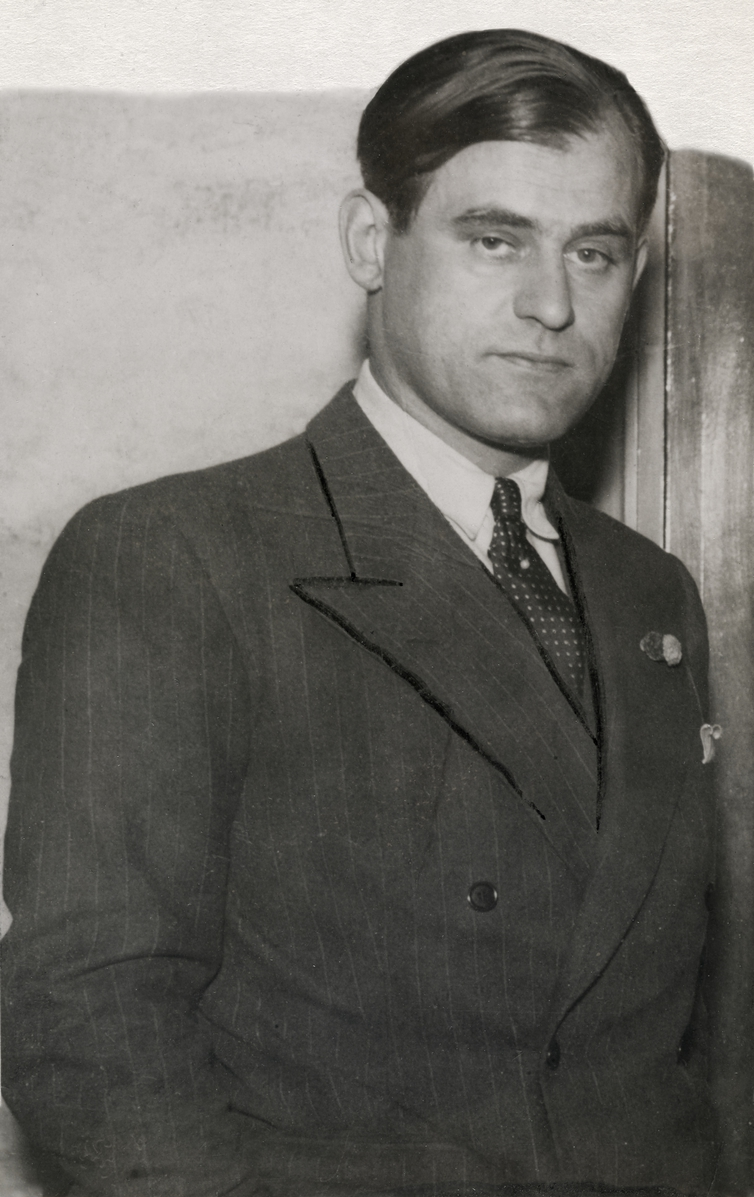
- Born: 6 December 1901; Bærum, Norway
- Died: 27 June 1973 (aged 71)
- Resting place: Haslum Kirkegård, Bærum
- Education: Norwegian Institute of Technology
- Occupation: Architect
- Organization: Nansenhjelpen
- Spouse: Karen Hirsch
- Children: Marit Greve; Siri Jemtland; Eigil Nansen
- Parents: Fridtjof Nansen; Eva Nansen
- Relatives: Michael Sars (grandfather); Maren Sars (grandmother); Ernst Sars (uncle); Georg Ossian Sars (uncle); Tim Greve (son-in-law); Hans Jørgen Darre Hirsch (brother-in-law); Axel Revold (brother-in-law); Dagny Hald (niece)
- Awards: Order of St. Olav (Commander 1970); Order of Merit of the Federal Republic of Germany; Decoration of Honour for Services to the Republic of Austria

Odd Nansen (6 December 1901 – 27 June 1973) was a Norwegian architect, writer, and humanitarian. He co-founded UNICEF and engaged in humanitarian efforts on behalf of Jews in the early years of World War II.

== Biography ==
Odd Nansen was born in Bærum, Akershus, Norway. He was the second youngest of five children born to scientist and explorer Fridtjof Nansen. He was raised at Lysaker outside of Oslo. After his mother Eva Nansen died in 1907, he was raised in the home of his neighbor Anton Klaveness. In 1920, he began studying architecture at the Norwegian Institute of Technology in Trondheim. From 1927 to 1930, he worked in New York City. During 1930, he returned to Oslo and apprenticed with Arnstein Arneberg.

In 1931, Nansen started his architectural practice in Oslo. He also formed the humanitarian organization Nansenhjelpen in 1936 to provide relief for Jews fleeing Nazi persecution in central Europe. The Jewish Children's Home in Oslo (jødiske barnehjemmet i Oslo) was established during 1939 under the auspices of Nansenhjelpen.

Nansen focused his efforts on the situation in Czechoslovakia. Together with his wife Kari Nansen and journalist Tove Filseth, wife of publisher Max Tau, he established a field office in Prague and traveled extensively in Europe in 1939 to get attention and help for refugees facing imminent destruction.

After returning to Norway he joined the nascent Norwegian resistance loyal to the Norwegian government-in-exile in London. As a result of his direct opposition to the government of Vidkun Quisling (1887-1945) he was arrested and detained by the Gestapo. He was thereafter deported to the concentration camp of Sachsenhausen. He was also a forced laborer at the Veidal Prison Camp. Nansen maintained a diary during his imprisonment that he hid and preserved. He describes in one instance "the skeletal figures" of the dead and dying. One diary entry, namely 10 February, 1945, gives insight into the tragic events of those who had barely survived a death march from the Lieberose work camp in Brandenburg. The slave labourers whom he witnessed were earmarked for 'selection.' Those considered unfit to work were taken to the 'Industriehof,' the main courtyard of the industrial-complex within Sachsenhausen, and were there murdered.

Nansen was also witness to a death march as stragglers arrived in Sachsenhausen from Auschwitz. He was deeply moved by the experiences of Thomas Buergenthal, a ten year old Jewish boy, parentless, alone and who incredulously had survived his ordeals. It was this lad, uncompromising and direct in his descriptions, who informed Nansen of the existence of the gas chambers and of what Auschwitz in its totality represented as the nerve centre of the Nazi mass-extermination process. These diaries were first published as one volume after the war, including a German translation entitled 'Von Tag zu Tag,' (Hamburg, 1949). His account provides a moving testimony and an in-depth analysis of life and death in Nazi concentration camps.

He survived captivity in the camps and returned to Norway where he resumed his architectural career, while initiating several humanitarian efforts. He was the president of One World from 1947 to 1956, and he is considered a co-founder of UNICEF. For his humanitarian efforts, Odd Nansen received many Norwegian and international decorations and honors. He was appointed commander of the Order of St. Olav in 1970. He was decorated with the Grand Cross of the Order of Merit of the Federal Republic of Germany and received the Decoration of Honour for Services to the Republic of Austria.

Among Nansen's architectural works are the main terminal building at the (now decommissioned) Fornebu Airport from 1963. He also led restoration work for his childhood home at Polhøgda.

Nansen was married to Karen "Kari" Hirsch (1903–1985). They were the parents of architect and humanitarian Eigil Nansen, architect Siri Jemtland and jurist Marit Greve, wife of diplomat Tim Greve.

== Bibliography ==
- Nansen, Odd (1965) [1946]. Fra dag til dag (in Norwegian). Oslo: Dreyer.
- Nansen, Odd (1949). From Day to Day. G. P. Putnam's Sons. ASIN B0007DQ3BU. the English translation of Fra dag til dag
- Nansen, Odd (1970). Langs veien. Opplevelser, møter og samtaler (in Norwegian). Oslo: Gyldendal.
- Nansen, Odd (1970). Tommy - en sannferdig fortelling (in Norwegian). Oslo: Gyldendal. ASIN B0007B4E40. - book about Thomas Buergenthal

== Related reading ==
- Odd Nansen, Timothy J. Boyce. editor (2016) From Day to Day: One Man's Diary of Survival in Nazi Concentration Camps (Vanderbilt University Press) ISBN 978-0826521002
