= Polhøgda =

Fridtjof Nansen Institute building, Norway

Coordinates: 59°54′20″N 10°38′06″E

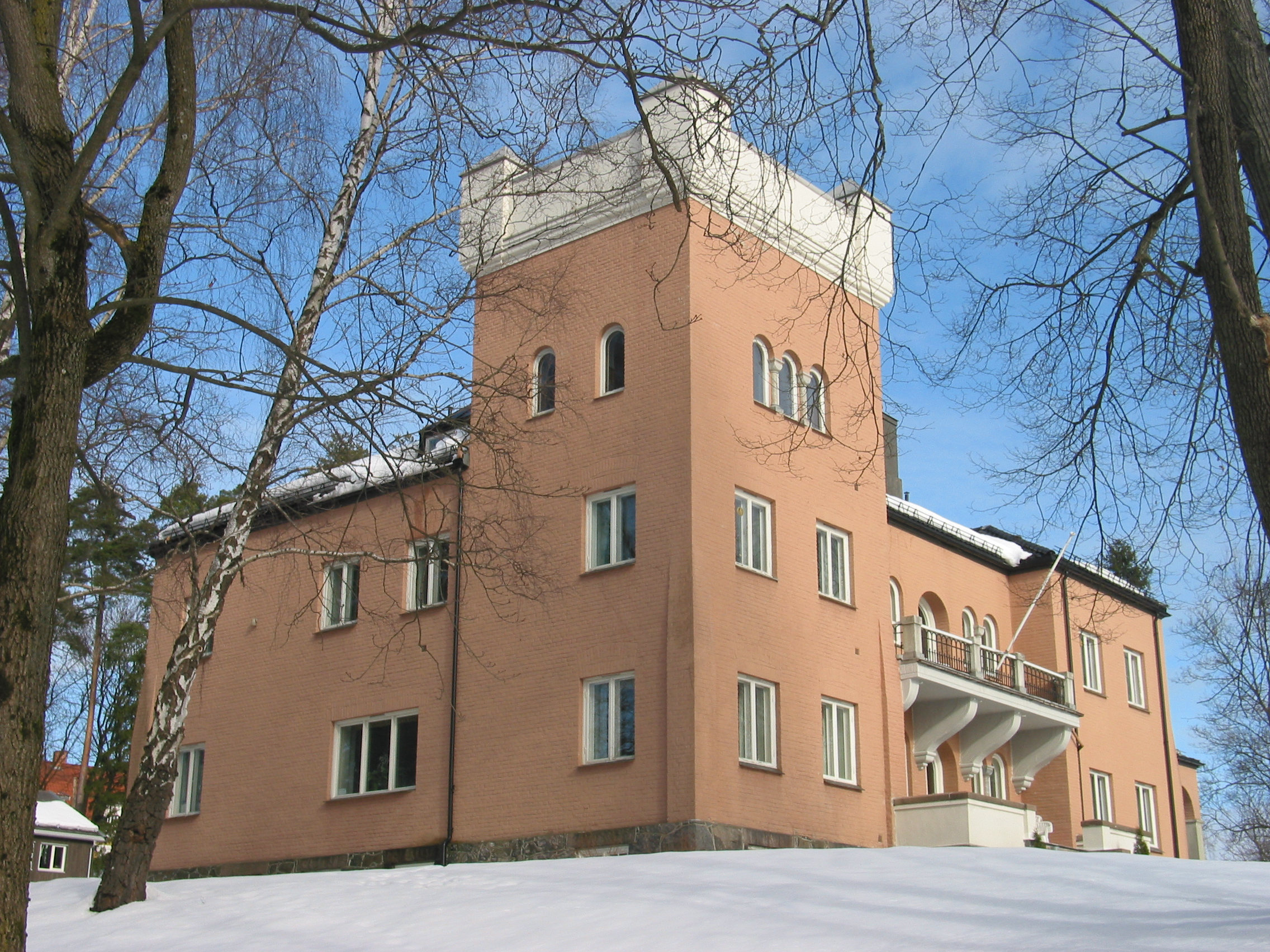

Polhøgda is the home of the Fridtjof Nansen Institute. It was originally built as the private home of Norwegian explorer Fridtjof Nansen. The manor home's architecture is Roman Revival, and the former estate lies between Lysaker and Fornebu in Bærum, Norway.

== Use by Fridtjof Nansen ==
The property originally belonged to Fornebu farm, but was separated from the farm in 1897. Construction on the property took place in 1900 and 1901. It was the home of Fridtjof Nansen and Eva Nansen from 1901, and was named Polhøiden in the day. Their son Odd Nansen was born and grew up here.

The building was designed by architect Hjalmar Welhaven, in cooperation with Fridtjof Nansen. Welhaven was Eva Nansen's first cousin. The architectural style is Neo-Roman.

The home was an important location of social life for a group of artists and intellectuals collectively known as Lysakerkretsen. The Nansen couple had lived at Godthaab near Lysaker since 1889, and was joined by people such as painters Eilif Peterssen in 1894, Erik Werenskiold in 1895 and Gerhard Munthe in 1899. Erik Werenskiold designed the interior of the dining room at Polhøgda. In addition, many people who lived elsewhere frequented the area near Lysaker; including Gerhard Gran, Andreas Aubert, Hans E. Kinck, Thorvald Lammers, Ernst Sars, Georg Ossian Sars and Moltke Moe. Eva Nansen held concerts here.

== Later use ==
After the death of Fridtjof Nansen in 1930, he was buried at the property. It was sold for a nominal fee from his heirs to a group of donators, who in turn gave the property to the University of Oslo. Their conditions included that the building should be preserved, and not be used as a museum. It was later owned by the Norwegian Academy of Science and Letters, and from 1947 the Norwegian Geographical Society. In 1948 the Geographical Society created a foundation to administer the property; the foundation was named Fridtjof Nansen-stiftelsen på Polhøgda from 1958. It currently hosts the research foundation Fridtjof Nansen Institute.

== Gallery ==
Polhøgda in 1909
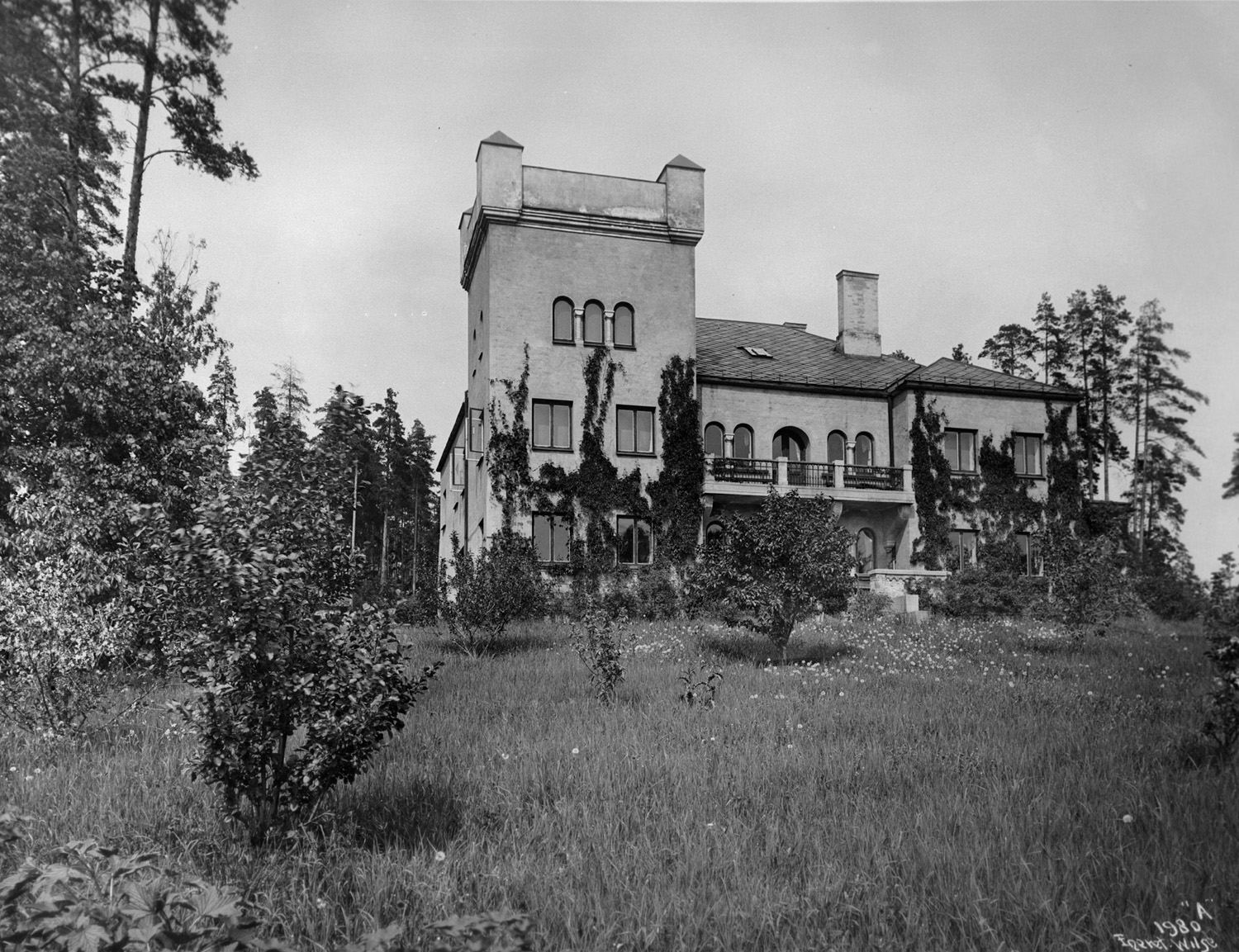
Exterior

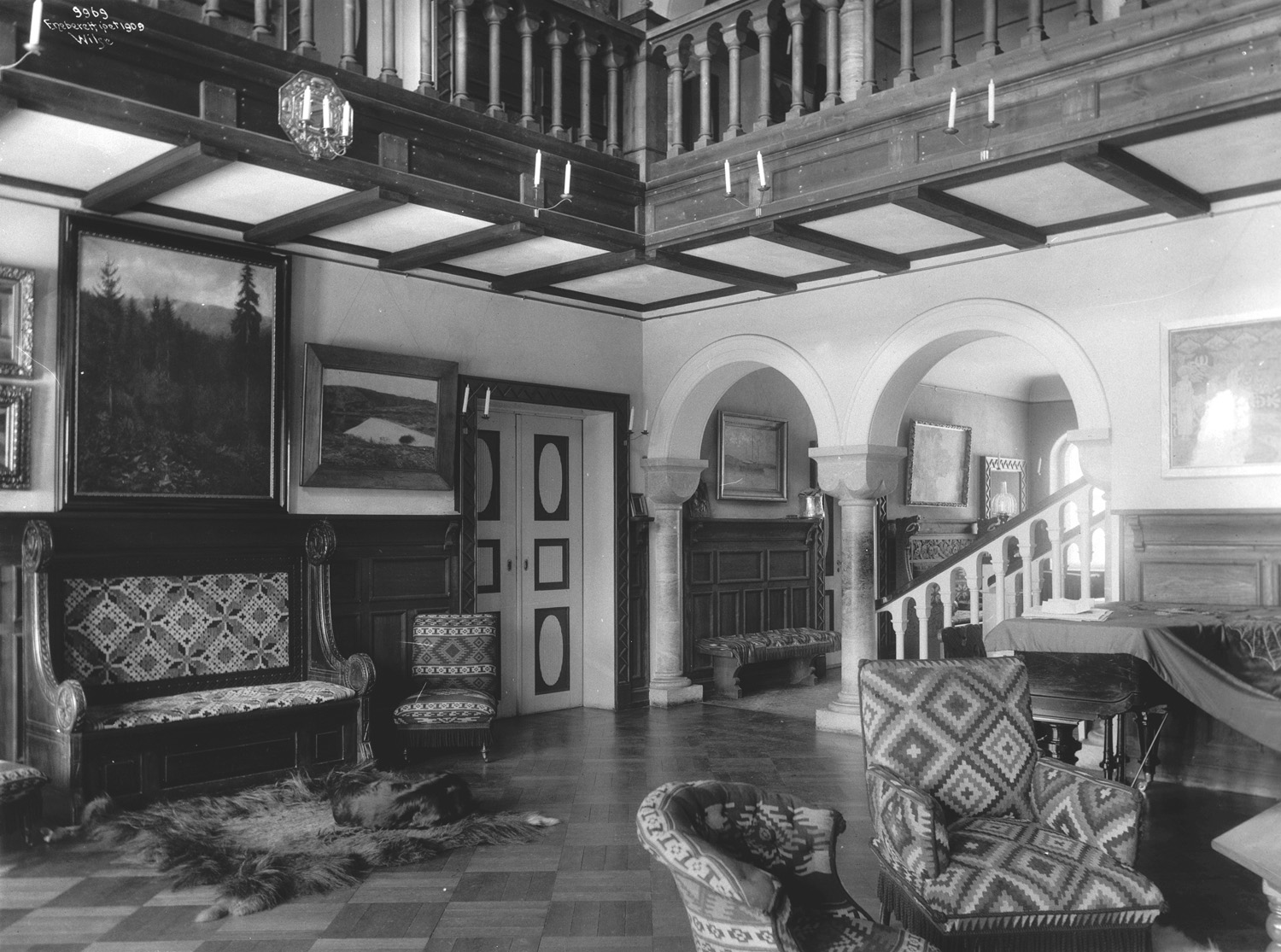
Interior

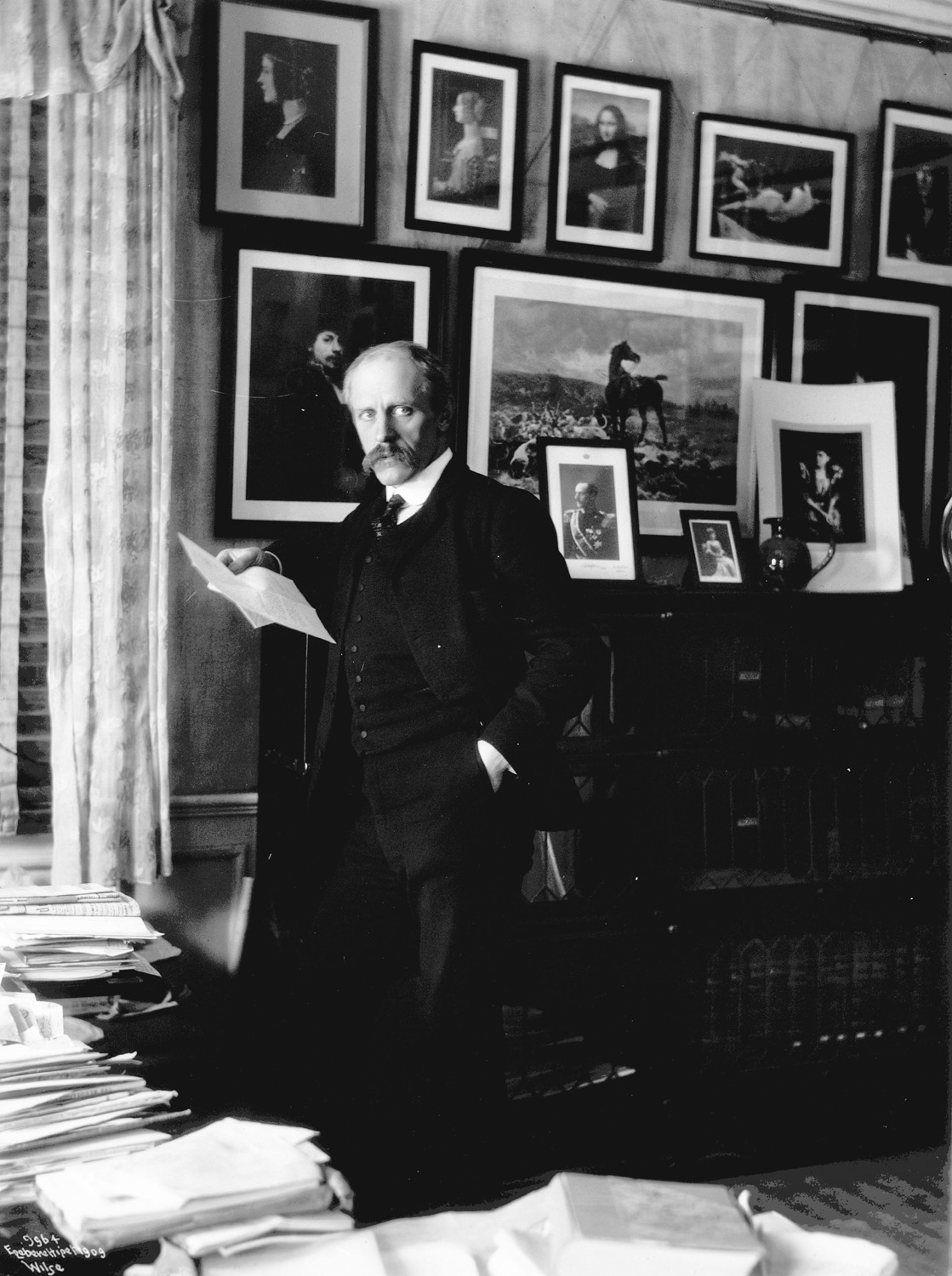
Fridtjof Nansen at Polhøgda
