= Odostomia turgida =

Scientific classification
- Kingdom: Animalia
- Phylum: Mollusca
- Class: Gastropoda
- Family: Pyramidellidae
- Genus: Odostomia
- Species: O. turgida

Binomial name
- Odostomia turgida (G.O. Sars, 1878)

Synonyms
- Odostomia unidentata var. turgida (G. O. Sars, 1878)

Species of gastropod

Odostomia turgida is a species of sea snail, a marine gastropod mollusc in the family Pyramidellidae, the pyrams and their allies.

== Distribution ==
This species occurs in the following locations:

- European waters (from Arctic Norway to Bay of Biscay)
