= Hjalmar Welhaven =

Norwegian architect

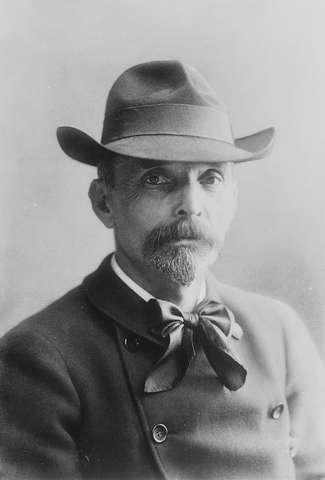
- Hjalmar Welhaven in 1920
- Born: 26 December 1850; Christiania, Norway
- Died: 12 April 1922 (aged 71)
- Occupations: Architect, palace manager, and sportsman
- Spouse: Margrethe Petersen Backer
- Children: Astri Welhaven Heiberg; Sigri Welhaven
- Parent(s): Johan Sebastian Welhaven; Josephine Angelica Bidoluac
- Relatives: Elisabeth Welhaven (aunt); Maren Sars (aunt); Kristian Welhaven (cousin); Ernst Sars (cousin); Georg Ossian Sars (cousin); Eva Nansen (cousin)

Hjalmar Welhaven (26 December 1850 – 18 April 1922) was a Norwegian architect, palace manager, and sportsman.

== Biography ==
=== Personal life ===
Welhaven was born in Christiania (now Oslo), Norway. He was the son of writer Johan Sebastian Welhaven and Josephine Angelica Bidoluac. He married painter Margrethe Petersen Backer in 1876. His aunts were Maren Sars and writer Elisabeth Welhaven, and he was a cousin of historian Ernst Sars, biologist Georg Sars and singer Eva Nansen. He was a brother-in-law of painter Harriet Backer and pianist and composer Agathe Backer Grøndahl. He was the father of the sculptor Sigri Welhaven and the painter Astri Welhaven Heiberg.

=== Career ===
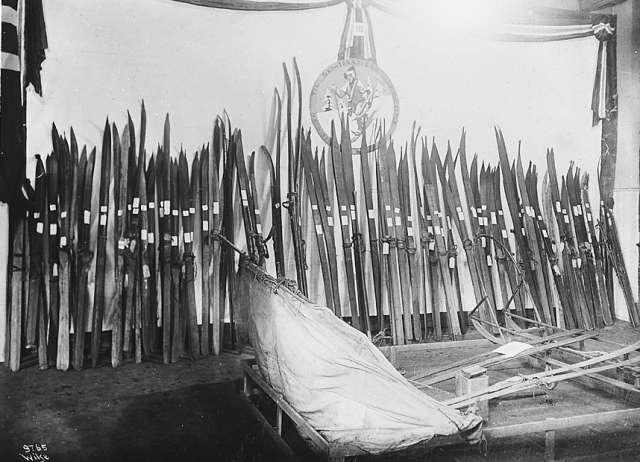
Welhaven's ski collection in 1909

Welhaven was a student at the Statens håndverks- og kunstindustriskole (now Norwegian National Academy of Craft and Art Industry) in 1870. He later studied architecture at Technische Hochschule (now Leibniz University Hannover) during 1871-73. He started practicing as an architect from 1875. In 1883 he was appointed manager for the Royal Palace in Oslo by King Oscar II. He was also responsible for Prinsehytta, Skinnarbøl the Bygdøy Royal Estate and Oscarshall. From 1905 he continued in this position for King Haakon VII of Norway, and led the comprehensive modernization project of the Royal Stables between 1905 and 1911, until he finally retired in 1920.

Besides his duties as a palace manager, he continued his architectural work. Among his designs were the tourist cabins Glitterheim and Gjendebu, and Polhøgda, the home of Fridtjof and Eva Nansen. He also designed several private dwellings in Oslo.

He was an eager sportsman, a member of the ski club Christiania Skiklub from its foundation in 1877, and participated in organizing the first ski jumping competition Husebyrennet in 1879. He chaired the rowing club Christiania Roklub from 1890 to 1891. His collection of skis from all over the country was shown at the 1914 Jubilee Exhibition at Frogner stadion. The collection was the basis for the ski collection at Holmenkollen Ski Museum, the world's oldest ski museum, when it opened at Frognerseteren in 1923. The museum was relocated to the Holmenkollen ski arena in 1951.

== Gallery ==
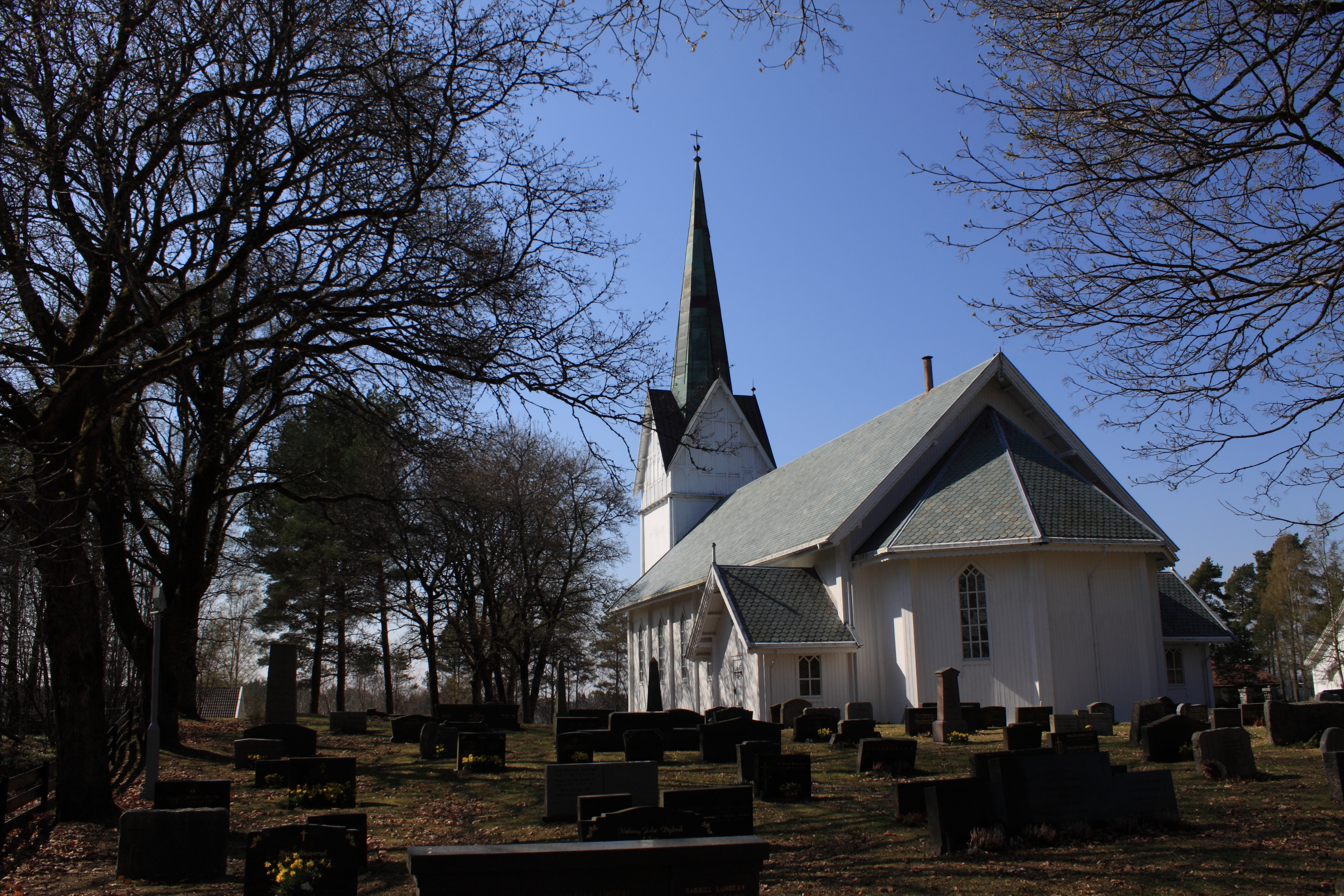
Hærland Church - 1878

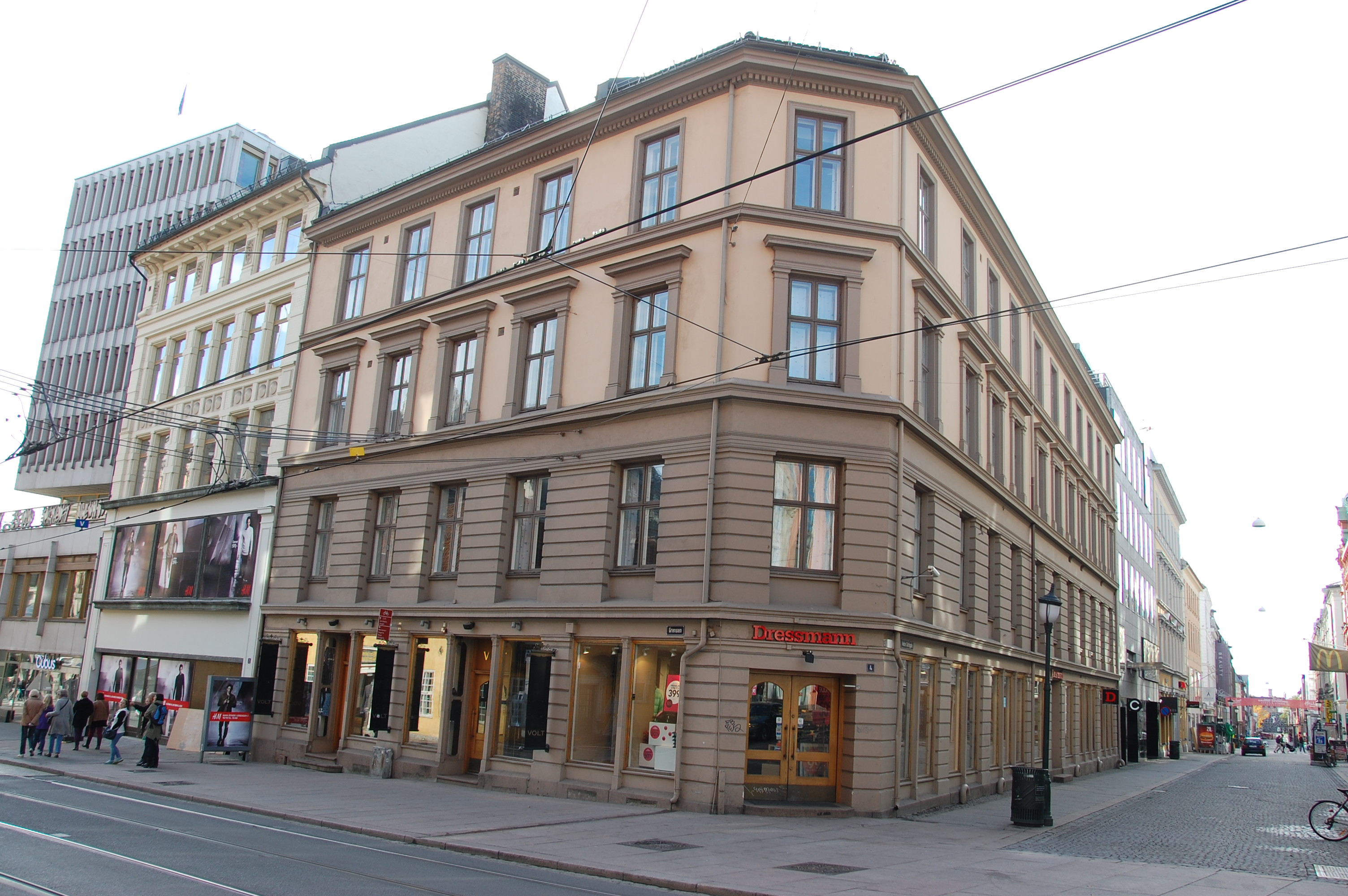
Grensen 4 - 1882

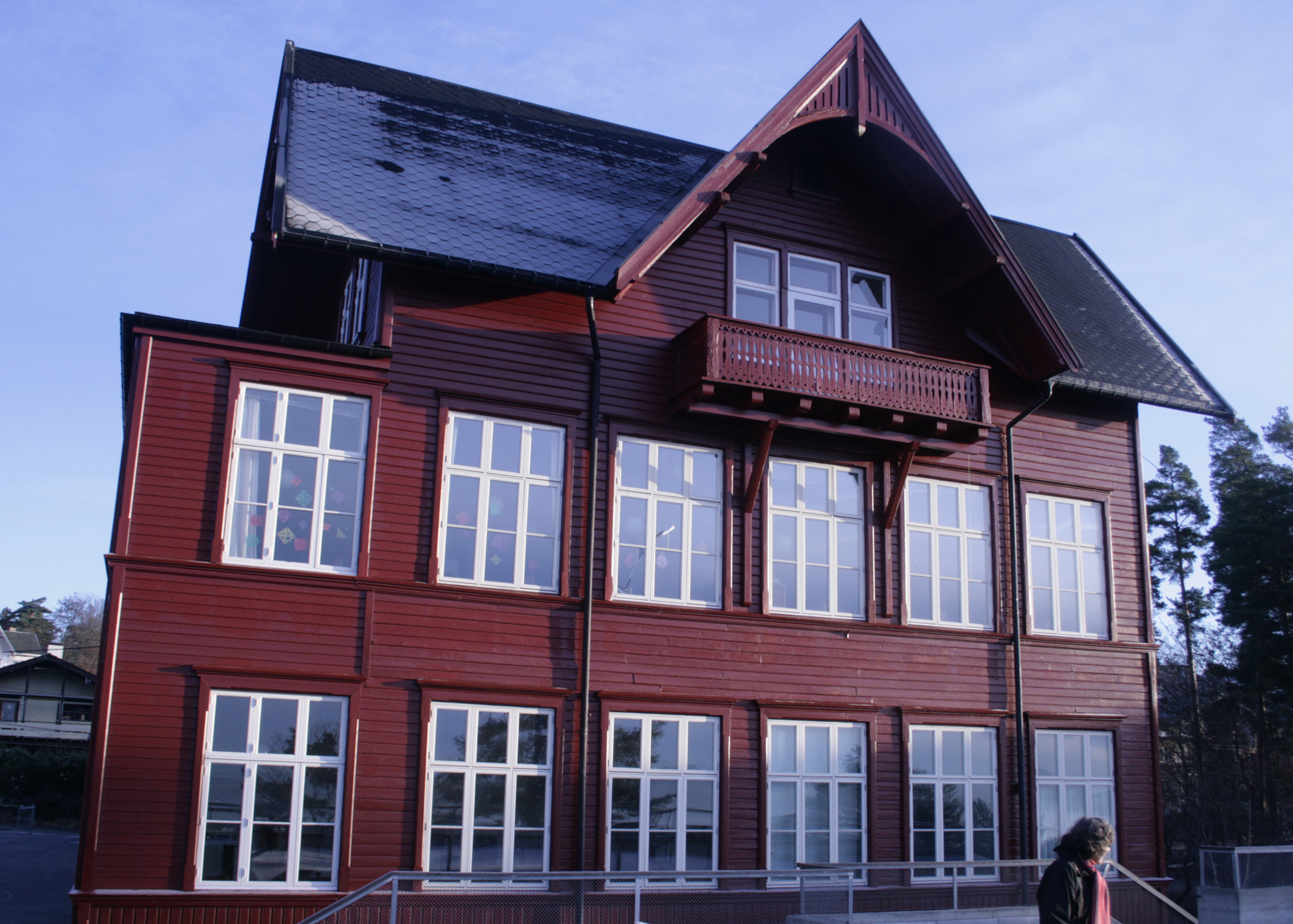
Solveien 113 - 1891

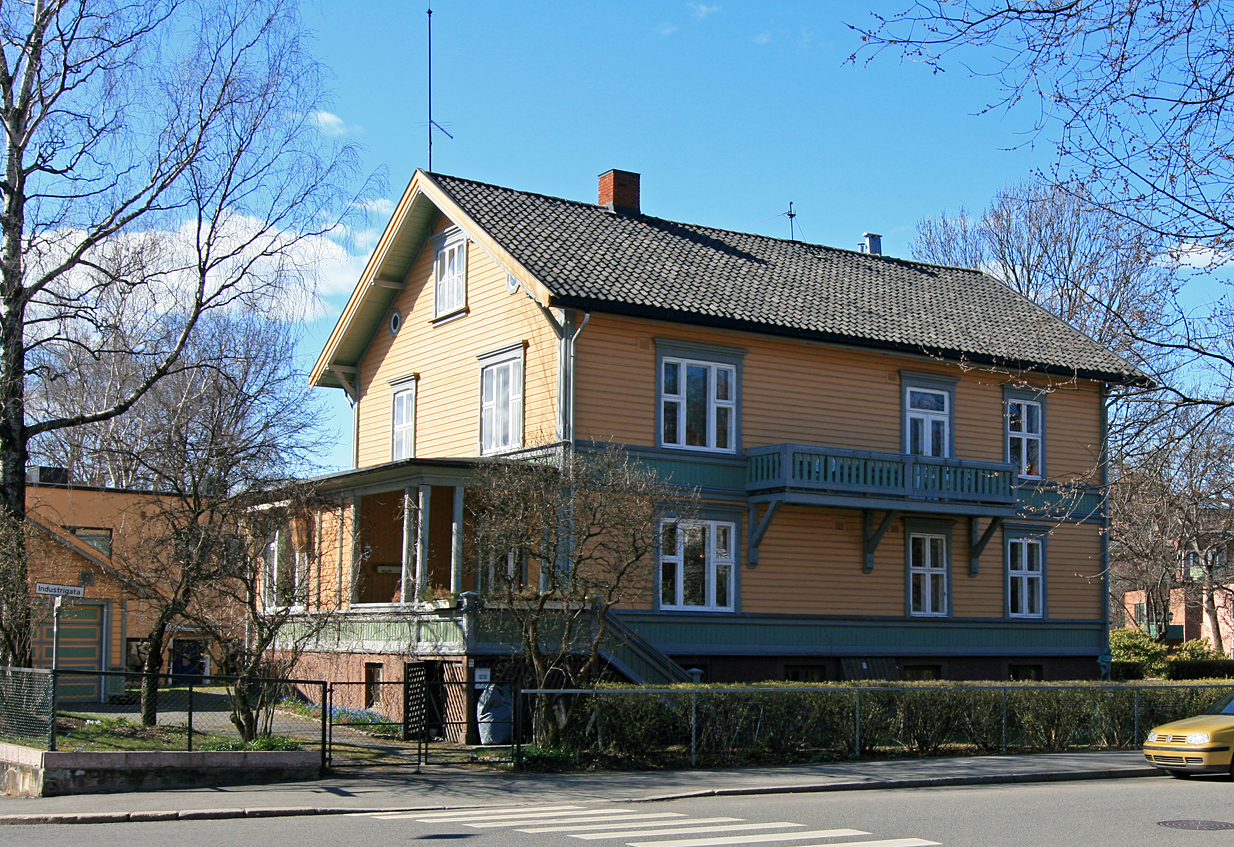
Professor Dahls gate 31 - 1896

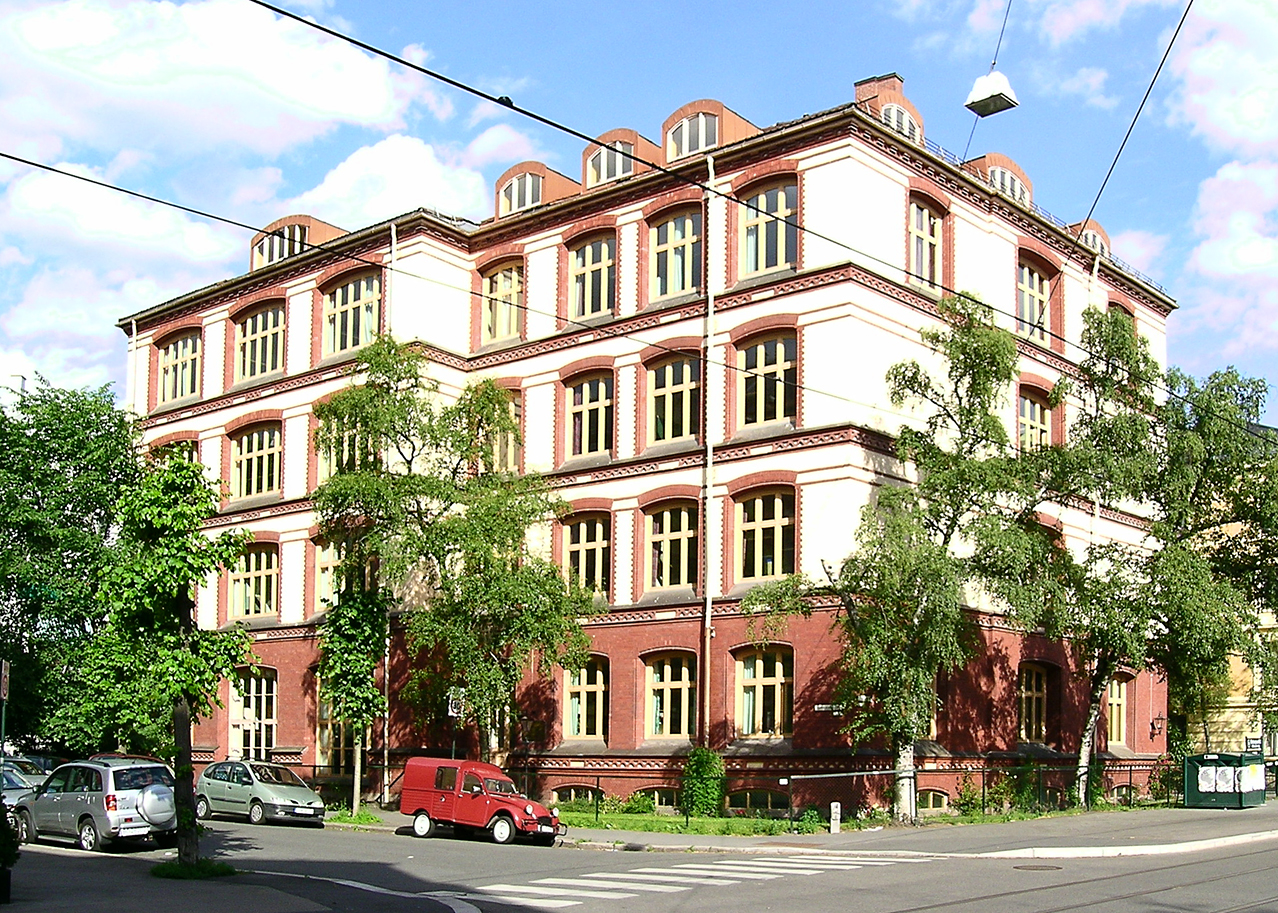
Bjørknes Private School - 1898

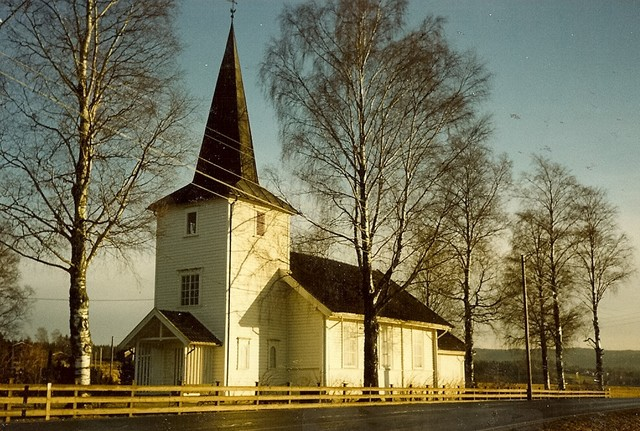
Auli Church - 1904
