= Eva Nansen =

Opera singer

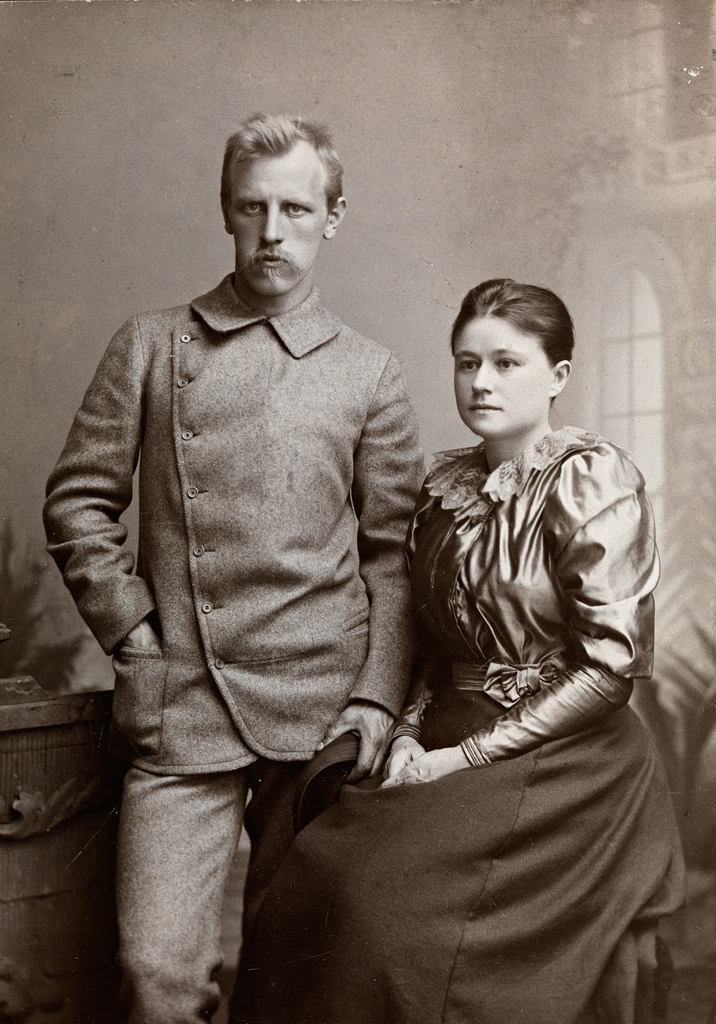
- Nansen (right) with her husband Fridtjof (left) in 1889
- Born: Eva Helene Sars; 17 December 1858; Christiania (now Oslo), Norway
- Died: 9 December 1907 (aged 48); Lysaker, Norway
- Occupation: Opera singer
- Spouse: Fridtjof Nansen (m. 1889)
- Children: 5, including Odd Nansen
- Parent(s): Michael Sars; Maren Welhaven
- Relatives: Ernst Sars (brother); Georg Ossian Sars (brother); Johan Sebastian Welhaven (uncle); Elisabeth Welhaven (aunt); Hjalmar Welhaven (cousin); Kristian Welhaven (cousin); Axel Revold (son-in-law); Marit Greve (granddaughter); Eigil Nansen (grandson); Dagny Hald (granddaughter)

Eva Helene Nansen (née Sars; 17 December 1858 – 9 December 1907) was a Norwegian mezzo-soprano singer and a women's skiing pioneer. She was the first wife of polar explorer Fridtjof Nansen and the mother of architect Odd Nansen.

== Personal life ==
Born in Christiania (now Oslo), she was a daughter of priest and professor of zoology Michael Sars (1805–1869) and his wife Maren Sars (1811–1898), and sister to biologist Georg Ossian Sars and historian Ernst Sars. Through her mother, she was a niece of poet and critic Johan Sebastian Welhaven and writer Elisabeth Welhaven, a first cousin of architect Hjalmar Welhaven and police chief Kristian Welhaven, and a great-granddaughter of priest Johan Sebastian Cammermeyer.

In September 1889 she married Fridtjof Nansen, the polar explorer and later winner of the Nobel peace prize for his work with refugees, as the League of Nations' High Commissioner for Refugees. They had several children, including Odd Nansen, an architect. She died of pneumonia on 9 December 1907 at their home, Polhøgda, in Lysaker.

== Career ==
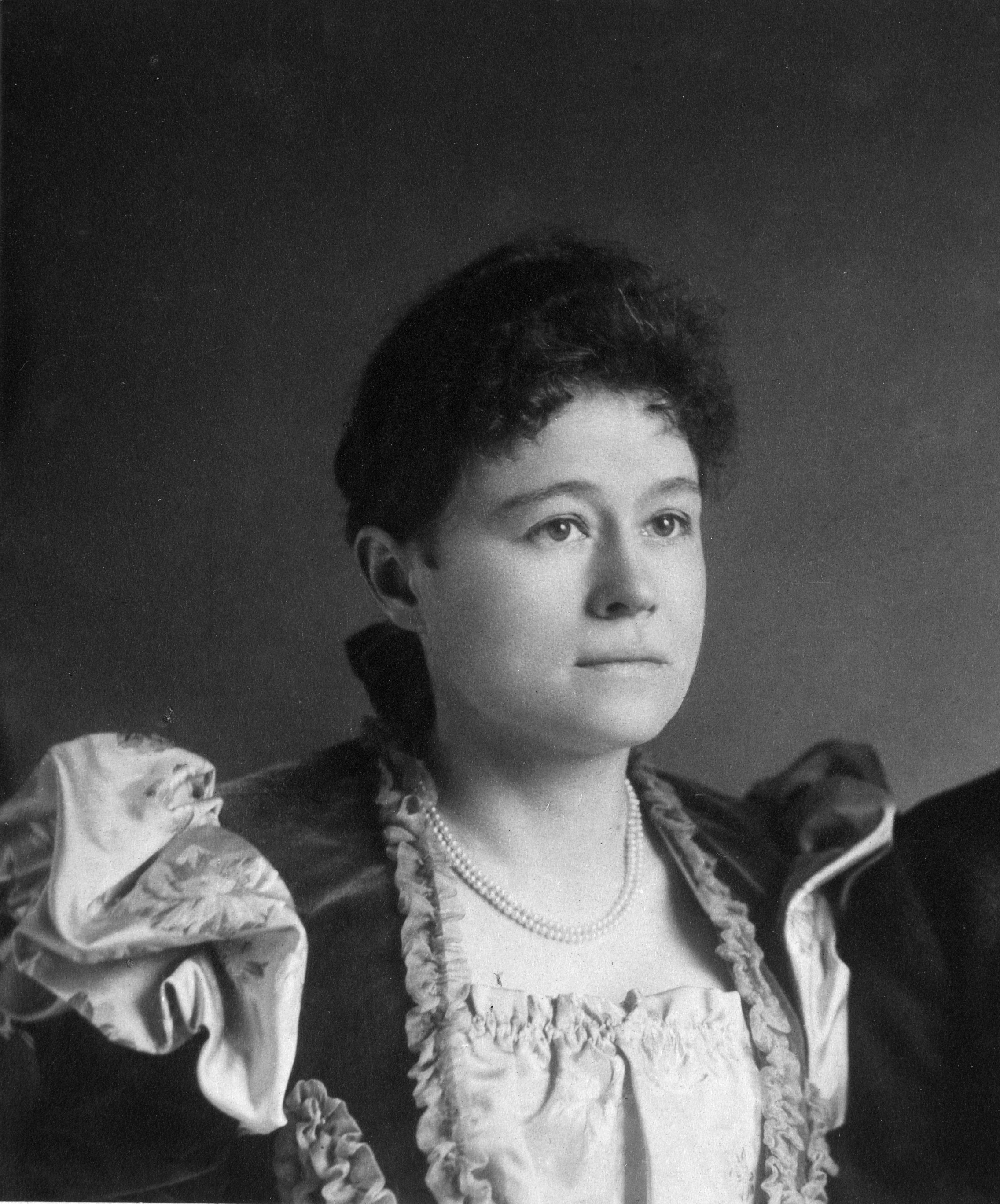
Nansen in 1897

Eva Sars studied singing for five years with her sister Mally and her brother-in-law, baritone singer and composer Thorvald Lammers. Her debut as an operatic singer came in 1881, in the Musikforeningen, a forerunner of the Oslo Philharmonic. She studied with Désirée Artôt in Berlin in 1886 and 1887. She specialized in the romance song form, and made her concert debut as a mezzo-soprano romance singer in 1886. She appeared at numerous concerts, nationally and internationally, between 1880 and 1900. Included in her opera repertoire were "Elsa's Dream" from Wagner's Lohengrin and "Gretchen" in Schumann's Scenes from Goethe's Faust. Her Scandinavian concert tours together with pianist Erika Lie Nissen were met with great enthusiasm. She was regarded as one of Norway's most prominent romance singers. Her last public concert was in December 1899, when she performed the newly composed Haugtussa song cycle, based by Edvard Grieg on Arne Garborg's poems.

She also contributed musically to gatherings in her mother's home, which before 1898 was a meeting place for liberals and intellectuals; it has been called "Christiania's first salon".

== Ski pioneer ==
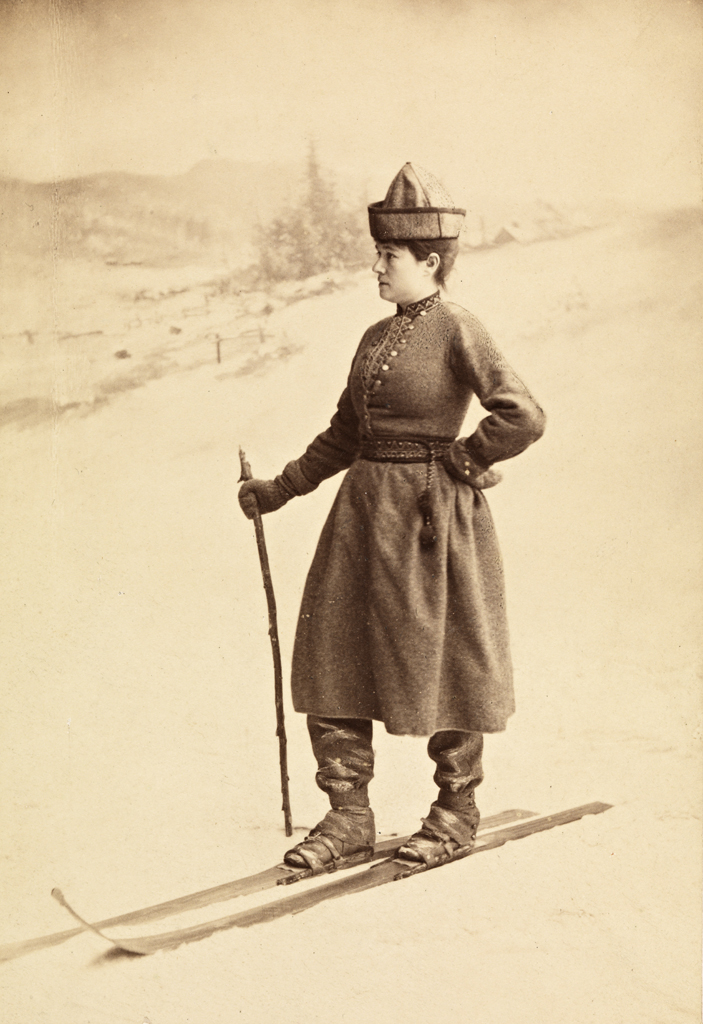
Nansen in 1889

Eva Sars (Nansen) was a competent skier. She and Cecilie Thoresen Krog drew attention as the only girls at the Husebyrennet ski jumping event, when they arrived on skis. Later she came to have great influence on gaining the right for women to participate in winter sports on equal terms with men. During Easter 1892 she probably became the first woman to cross the Hardangervidda mountain plateau on skis, when she did so with her husband Fridtjof Nansen. On this occasion she wore a somewhat challenging ski costume for the time, designed by Nansen and made by her, in which her skirt only reached slightly below the knees. In the article Skiløbningen, published in the newspaper Verdens Gang in March 1893, she argued against those who moralized against female skiing.

== Legacy ==
Eva was portrayed by Veslemøy Haslund in the 1968 film Bare et liv – historien om Fridtjof Nansen, and by Lise Fjeldstad in the 1985 serial The Last Place on Earth.
