= The Queen Sonja Art Stable =

Art museum in Oslo, Norway

Coordinates: 59.9163°N 10.7235°E

- Dronning Sonja KunstStall
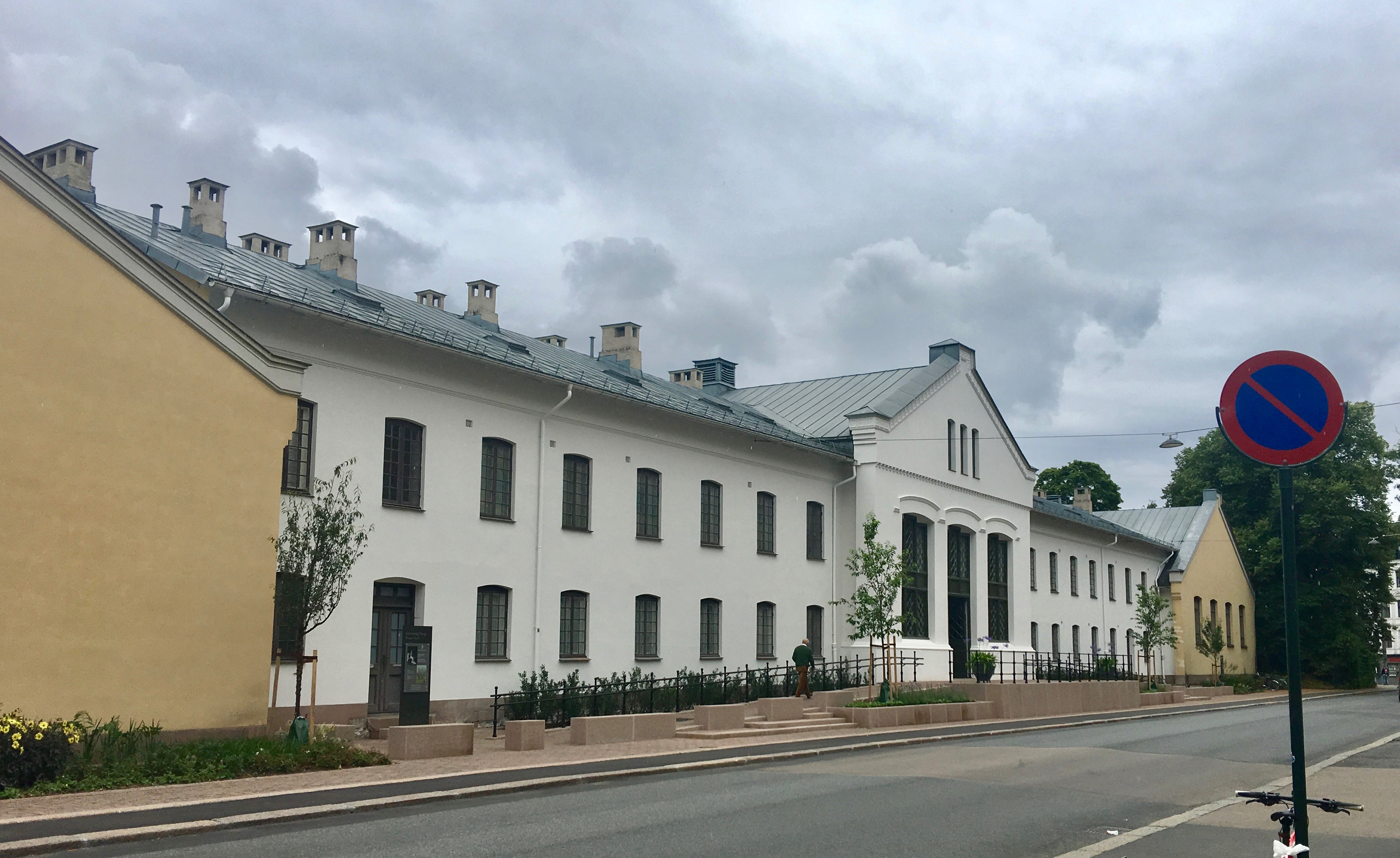
- The Art Stable seen from Parkveien
- Interactive map of the The Queen Sonja Art Stable area

General information
- Architectural style: Neoclassicism
- Location: Oslo, Norway
- Construction started: 1844; 182 years ago
- Completed: 1849; 177 years ago
- Renovated: 1908–1911; 115 years ago 2017; 9 years ago
- Client: Charles III of Norway

Design and construction
- Architects: Hans Ditlev Franciscus von Linstow; Hjalmar Welhaven

The Queen Sonja Art Stable (Norwegian: Dronning Sonja KunstStall) is a museum, art gallery and concert hall located in the former stables of the Royal Palace in Oslo.

== History ==
The stable building, located close to the palace park, was constructed simultaneously as the Royal Palace and was completed in 1849. Originally, the stables could house 38 horses, but the compound was considerably expanded and improved during the reign of King Haakon VII, and his equestrian wife Queen Maud. Between 1905 and 1911, the stables were built into an equestrian facility with a riding hall, blacksmith and a veterinary area. Architect Hjalmar Welhaven led the expansion project while Queen Maud took the initiative to model the improved stable hall after the Royal Mews in London.

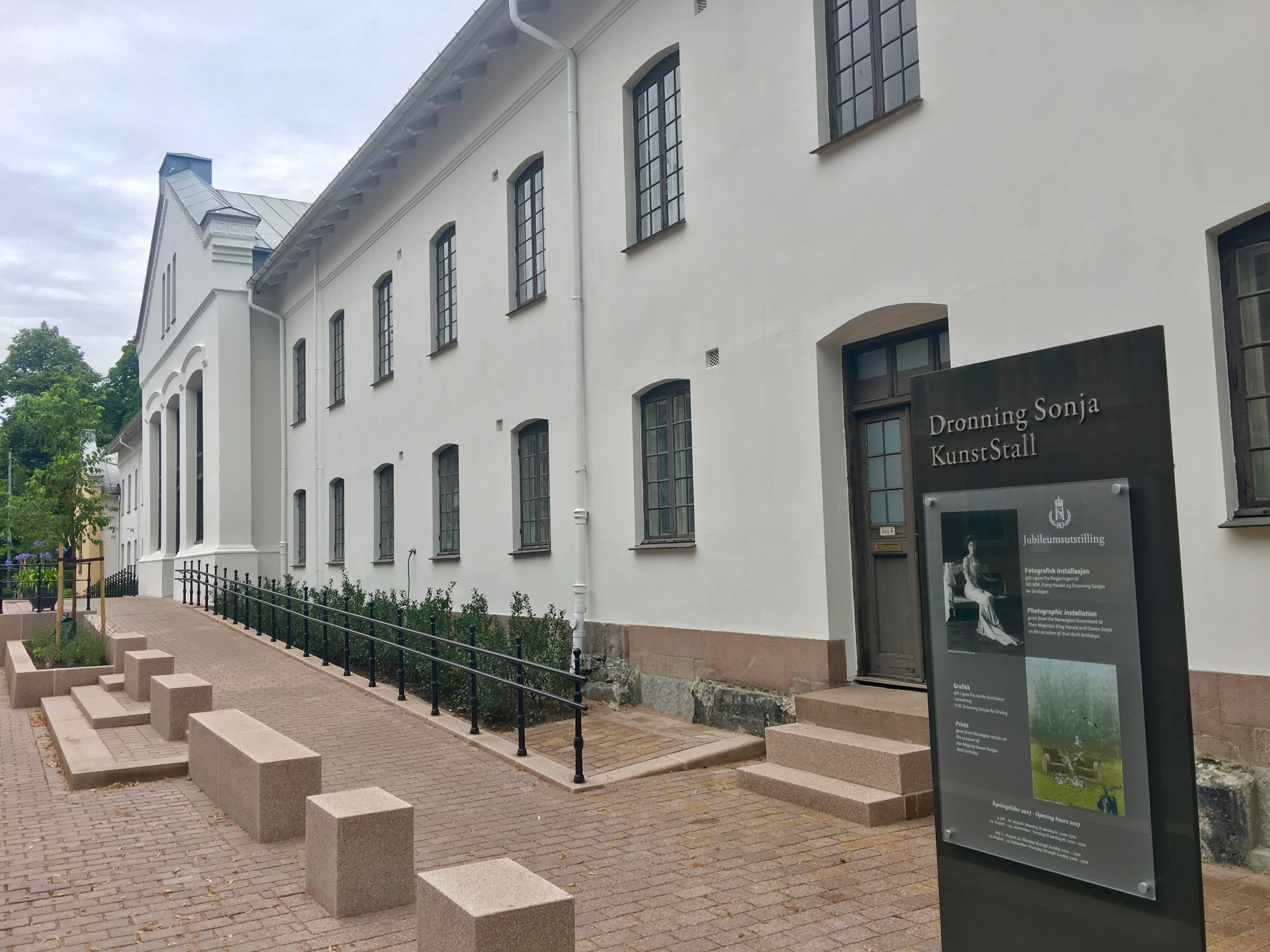
The Art Stable

== Renovations and current use ==
Horses have not been kept in the stables since 1940 and after the end of the German occupation of Norway during the Second World War the building was mostly used as a storage facility and garage. King Harald decided to renovate the building as a present to his wife Queen Sonja on her 80th birthday celebration in 2017. The renovations were made with the combined efforts of Statsbygg, Riksantikvaren and Snøhetta.

The Art Stable will be open from March through December each year and function as a venue for exhibitions of art well as presentations on historical and cultural items from the Norwegian Royal Collections.

== Exhibitions. 2017- ==
- "Opening exhibition" an extensive collection of graphic prints gifted by Norwegian artists.
- “The Royal Stable. Horses and their equipage 1905–1940.”
- "Sculpture", an exhibition by Kjell Erik Killi Olsen.
- "Tone Vigeland: Jewelry and Sculpture"
- "Tradition and Inspiration". An exhibition of Norwegian folk art and folk costumes, including pieces owned by members of the Royal Family.
- "History". An exhibition of three generations of Sami artists: Iver Jök, Synnøve Persen, and Britta Markatt-Labba.
- "The Dream of Norway: King Haakon and Queen Maud in the Royal Collections".

== See also ==
- Royal Palace
- Norwegian royal family
