= Kjell Erik Killi Olsen =

Norwegian painter and sculptor (born 1952)

Kjell Erik Killi Olsen (born 23 July 1952 in Trondheim) is a Norwegian painter and sculptor. He is primarily known for characteristic artwork, frequently depicting humanoid, grotesque, sexual and humorous figures of fantasy.

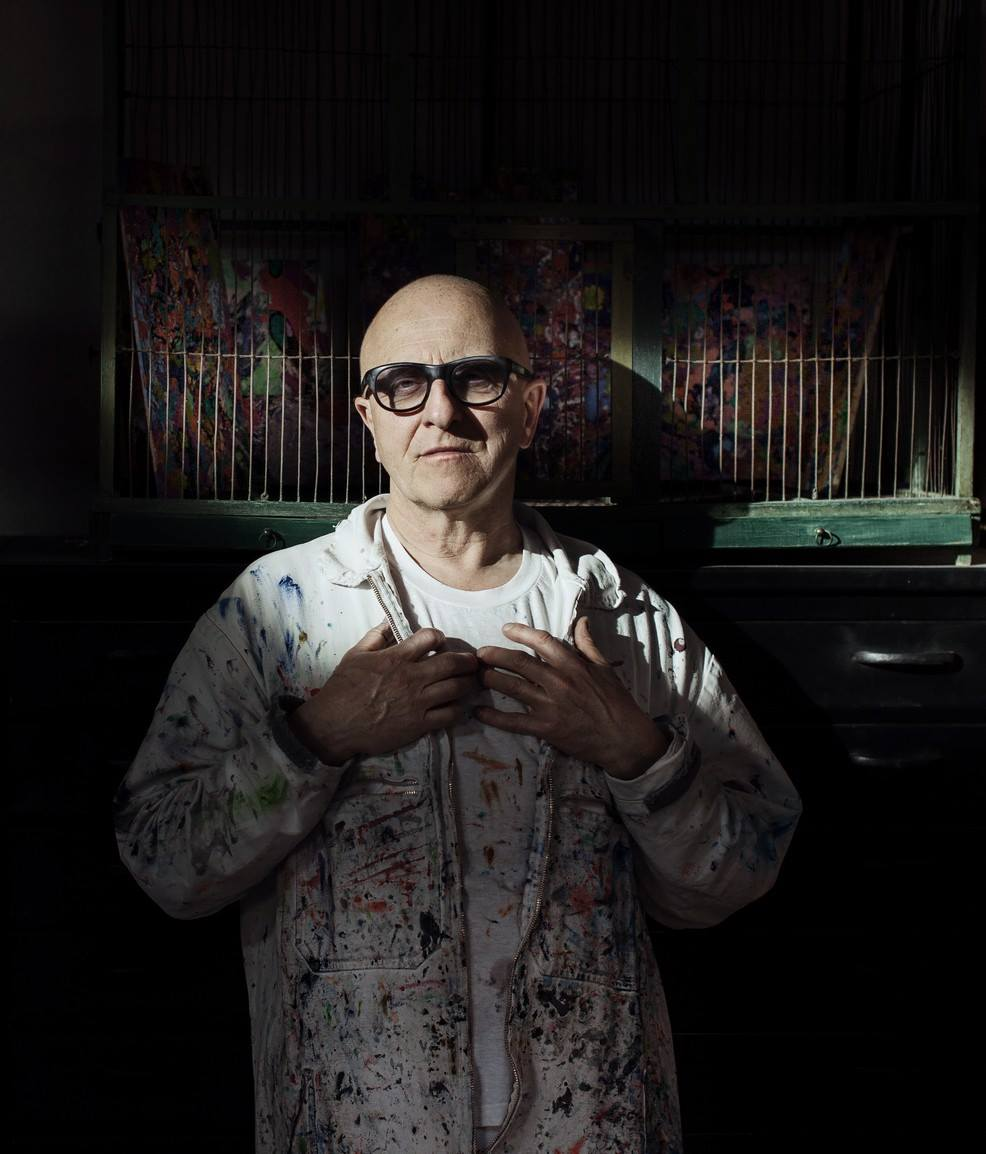
Kjell Erik Killi Olsen © 2015, David Mignérat

== Biography ==
Kjell Erik Killi Olsen was educated at Kunstskolen i Trondheim, Akademia Sztuk Pięknych at Kraków, Poland and at the Norwegian National Academy of Fine Arts in Oslo during the period 1972–1981.

In addition to shows and retrospectives in Norway, Killi Olsen has held exhibitions in other parts of the world, most frequently New York City and São Paulo. He is considered one of Norway's most wealthy artists. Erik Killi Olsen lives in Oslo, Norway and Château de Fontarèches, Fontarèches, France.

== Selected solo exhibition ==
- 2025 Kunstmuseet Nord-Trøndelag, Namsos, Norway
- 2018 The Queen Sonja Art Stable, Oslo, Norway
- 2015 Galerie Pascal Lainé, Ménerbes, France
- 2014 Smart Clothes, New York City, United States
- 2013 Loock Galerie, Berlin, Germany
- 2011 The Second Book, Galleri Erik Steen, Oslo, Norway
- 2010 Formuesforvaltning, Oslo, Norway
- 2009 Aalesunds Kunstforening, Ålesun, Norway
- 2008 Arkivhusstiftelsen, Smedjebacken, Sverig, Sweden
- 2007 The Beginning, Trondheim Kunstmuseum, Norway
- 2007 The Beginning, Nordnorsk Kunstmuseum, Norway
- 2005 The Beginning, Henie Onstad Art Centre, Høvikodden, Norway
- 2005 Heiberg Cummings Design, New York, USA
- 2004 Galleri Wang, Oslo, Norway
- 2004 Rogaland Kunstmuseum with Michael Kvium, Stavanger, Norway
- 2003 Pincoteca do Estado, São Paulo, Brazil
- 2003 Esbjerg Kunstmuseum with Michael Kvium, Esbjer, Denmark
- 2001 Lillehammer Art Museum, Lillehammer, Norway
- 2001 Galleri Wang, Oslo, Norway
- 1998 Christianssand Art Society, Kristiansa, Norway
- 1998 Bridgewater/Lustberg Gallery, New York, USA
- 1998 Galleri Christian Dam, Copenhagen
- 1997 Galleri Bouhlou, Bergen, Norway
- 1997 Trondheim Art Museum, Trondheim, Norway
- 1996 Rogaland Art Center, Stavanger, Norway
- 1996 Henie Onstad Art Center, Høvikodde, Norway
- 1996 Galleri Bodøgaard, Bodø, Norway
- 1996 Bridgewater/Lustberg Gallery, New York, USA
- 1996 Galleri Brandstrup, Stavanger, Norway
- 1995 Galleri Wang, Oslo, Norway
- 1995 Bergen International Festival, Bergen Art Society; Stavanger Art Society, Stenersenmuseet, Oslo, Norway
- 1993 Bergen Art Society, Bergen, Norway
- 1993 Galleri Sølvberget, Stavanger, Norway
- 1993 Galleri Ismene, Trondhei, Norway
- 1992 Galleri Wang, Oslo, Norway
- 1992 Nordnorsk Kunstmuseum, Tromsø, Norway
- 1990 Wang Kunsthandel, Stavanger, Norway
- 1990 Festivalexhibitor, Molde, Norway
- 1989 Bergen Art Society, Bergen, Norway
- 1989 Galleri Sølvberget, Stavanger, Norway
- 1989 Sala Uno, Roma, Italy
- 1989 Norway’s representative at The Biennale in São Paulo, Brazil
- 1988 Galleri Wang, Oslo, Norway
- 1987 Salvatore Ala Gallery, New York, USA
- 1986 Galleria Salvatore Ala, Milan, Italy
- 1985 New Math Gallery, New York, USA
- 1985 Galleri Ingeleiv, Bergen, Norway
- 1985 Bridgewater Gallery, New York, USA
- 1984 Henie-Onstad Artcenter, Høvikodde, Norway
- 1984 New Math Gallery, New York, USA
- 1983 ABC No Rio, New York, USA
- 1983 New Math Gallery, New York, USA

== Public collections ==
- The National Gallery, Oslo, Norway
- Riksgalleriet, Oslo, Norway
- Norwegian Art Council, Oslo, Norway
- NorwayTröndelag Artmuseum, Trondheim, Norway
- Bergen Billedgalleri, Bergen, Norway
- Tromsø Museum, Tromsø, Norway
- The town of Lillehammer Art-collection, Lillehammer, Norway
- The National Museum of Contemporary Art, Oslo, Norway
- NorwayRogaland Kunstmuseum, Stavanger, Norway
- Göteborg Konstmuseum, Gothenburg, Sweden
- Museum of Modern Art, Campinas, Brazil
- Norsk Hydro ASA, Oslo, Norway

== Selected public commissions ==
- 1996 Libris Karl Johan, Oslo, Norway
- 1996 Aschehoug Publishing Company, Oslo, Norway
- 1994 Statoil, Trondheim, Norway
- 1994 Artscape Nordland, Bø; i Vesterålen, Norway
- 1994 Bergesen d.y. A/S, Oslo, Norway
- 1991 Olavshallen, Trondheim, Norway
- 1990 Namsos Cultural Center, Namsos, Norway
- 1988 Sola Airport, Sola, Norway
