= Bernhard Askvig =

Norwegian police officer and Nazi collaborator

Bernhard Askvig (September 6, 1885 – October 31, 1954) was a Norwegian police officer and Nazi collaborator during the German occupation of Norway from 1940 to 1945. He helped escort the invading Germans into Oslo. He was inserted as chief of police in Oslo later in April 1940, after the removal of Welhaven. He later was given the title of "politipresident" (police president). He was a central figure in the Nazification of the Norwegian police, together with Jonas Lie. He was sentenced to twelve years of forced labor imprisonment for treason after the war. He died in Germany shortly after serving his sentence.
