= Ernst Sars =

Norwegian professor, historian, author and editor (1835–1917)

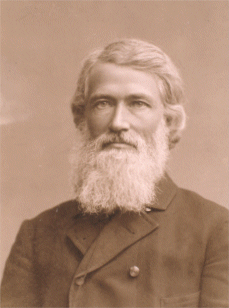
- Ernst Sars (ca. 1883)
- Born: 11 October 1835; Florø, Norway
- Died: 27 January 1917 (aged 81); Aker Municipality, Norway
- Education: University of Oslo
- Occupations: Professor, historian, author and editor
- Notable work: Udsigt over den norske Historie, 1873-1891
- Parents: Michael Sars; Maren Welhaven
- Relatives: Eva Nansen (sister); Georg Ossian Sars (brother); Fridtjof Nansen (brother-in-law); Odd Nansen (nephew); Johan Sebastian Welhaven (uncle); Elisabeth Welhaven (aunt); Hjalmar Welhaven (cousin); Kristian Welhaven (cousin)
- Awards: Crown Prince's gold medal - 1856

Johan Ernst Welhaven Sars (11 October 1835 – 27 January 1917) was a Norwegian professor, historian, author and editor. Assuming perspectives from the positivism philosophical school, his main work was Udsigt over den norske Historie, four volumes issued from 1873 to 1891. He co-edited the magazines Nyt norsk Tidskrift from 1877 to 1878, and Nyt Tidsskrift from 1882 to 1887. He was politically active for the Liberal Party of Norway and among the party's most central theoreticians.

== Biography ==
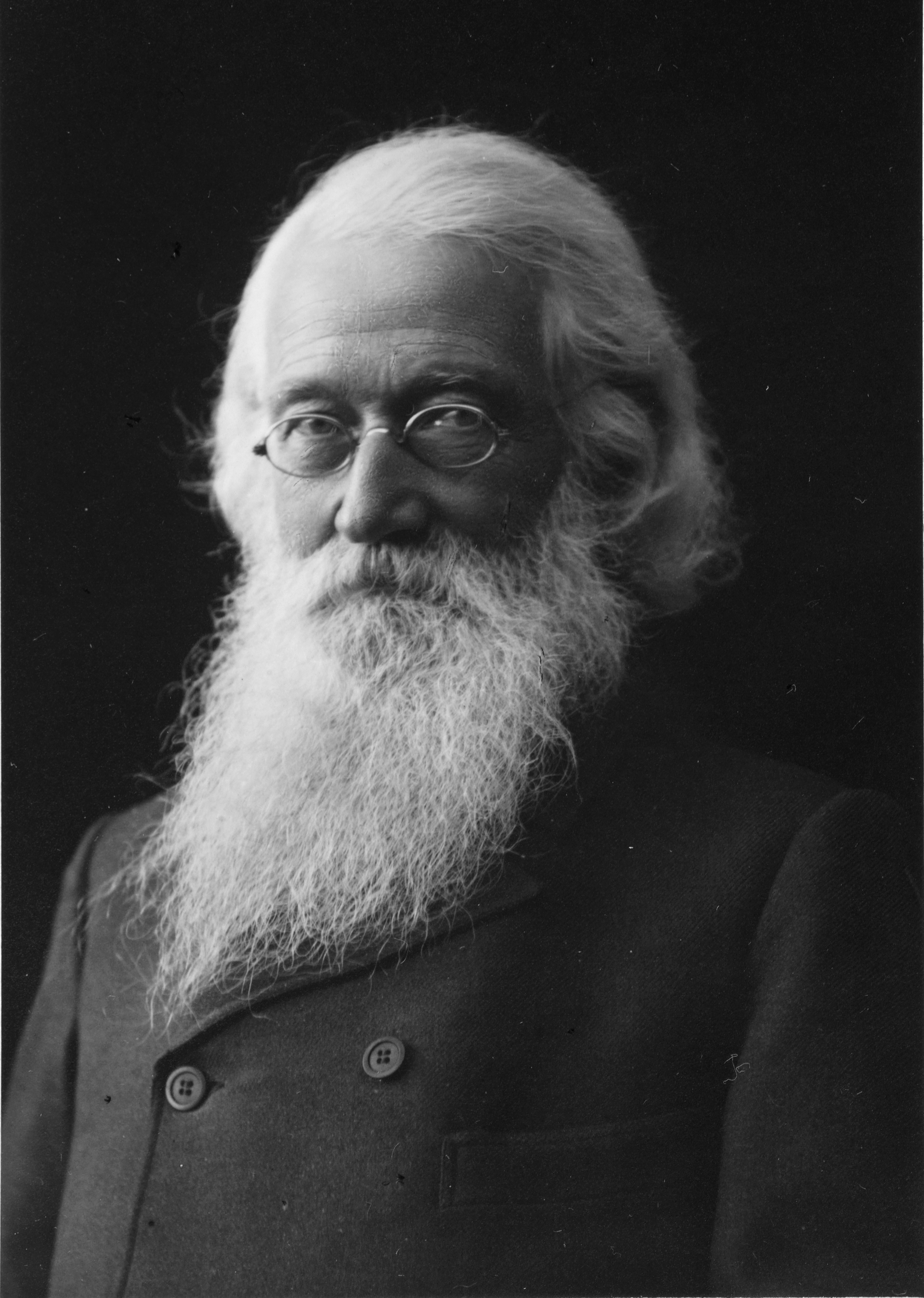
Johan Ernst Sars ca. 1907-1910

=== Personal life ===
Sars was born in the parish of Florø (now Kinn Municipality) in Nordre Bergenhus Amt (now part of Vestland county), Norway. He was the son of Michael Sars (1805–1869) and Maren Cathrine Welhaven (1811–1898). His father was vicar at Kinn Church and at Manger Church and was professor of zoology at the University of Christiania from 1854. His mother was a sister of poet Johan Sebastian Welhaven and author Elisabeth Welhaven.

He was a brother of singer Eva Sars and zoologist Georg Ossian Sars. He was a cousin of architect Hjalmar Welhaven as well as a brother-in-law of explorer and scientist Fridtjof Nansen and musician Thorvald Lammers. He was not married, and lived along with his brother at their mother's residence until she died in 1898. He died at Aker Municipality in 1917.

=== Career ===
Sars attended the Bergen Cathedral School from 1849. In 1853 he moved to Christiania (now Oslo) as a student. He initiated studies in medicine, but he started to study history. In 1856, he was awarded the Crown Prince's gold medal (Kronprinsens gullmedalje) for having written a prize-winning treatise on the Kalmar Union. He spent the summers of 1858 and 1859 in Copenhagen, in order to copy Norwegian documents in Danish archives. He wrote a pioneering work on Norway during the union with Denmark (Norge under Foreningen med Danmark), published in four parts between 1858 and 1865. He was appointed as an assistant at the National Archival Services of Norway (Norwegian: Riksarkivet) from 1860 to 1874.

After having received a scholarship he lectured at the University of Kristiania from 1870, where he first introduced the subject positivism, and later lectured on Norwegian history. His main work was Udsigt over den norske Historie, a continuous treatment of Norwegian history from the Viking Age to contemporary times, which was published in four volumes between 1873 and 1891. The first volume of the series established Sars among the leading intellectuals in Norway. It earned him an extraordinary professorship in 1874, after a Parliamentary decision.

Sars co-edited the magazines Nyt norsk Tidskrift (with Jens Lieblein) from 1877 to 1878, and Nyt Tidsskrift (with Olaf Skavlan) from 1882 to 1887. He took part in politics, and was active for the Liberal Party, along with Bjørnstjerne Bjørnson. After his publication of Historisk Indledning til Grundloven (Historical Introduction to the Constitution) in 1882, he was regarded among the Liberal Party's most central theoreticians. He also regarded the dissolution of the union between Sweden and Norway to be the only practical solution to the conflicts with Sweden. He wrote the work Norges politiske historie 1815–85, published between 1899 and 1904, and continued lecturing until 1911. As of 1898, Sars was among the contributors of Ringeren, a political and cultural magazine established by Sigurd Ibsen.

== Selected works ==
- Udsigt over den norske historie, 4 volumes, 1873-1891
- Historisk Indledning til Grundloven, 1882
- Norges politiske historie 1815-1885, 1904
- Samlede værker, 4 volumes, 1911-1912
