= Sigri Welhaven =

Norwegian artist and sculptor

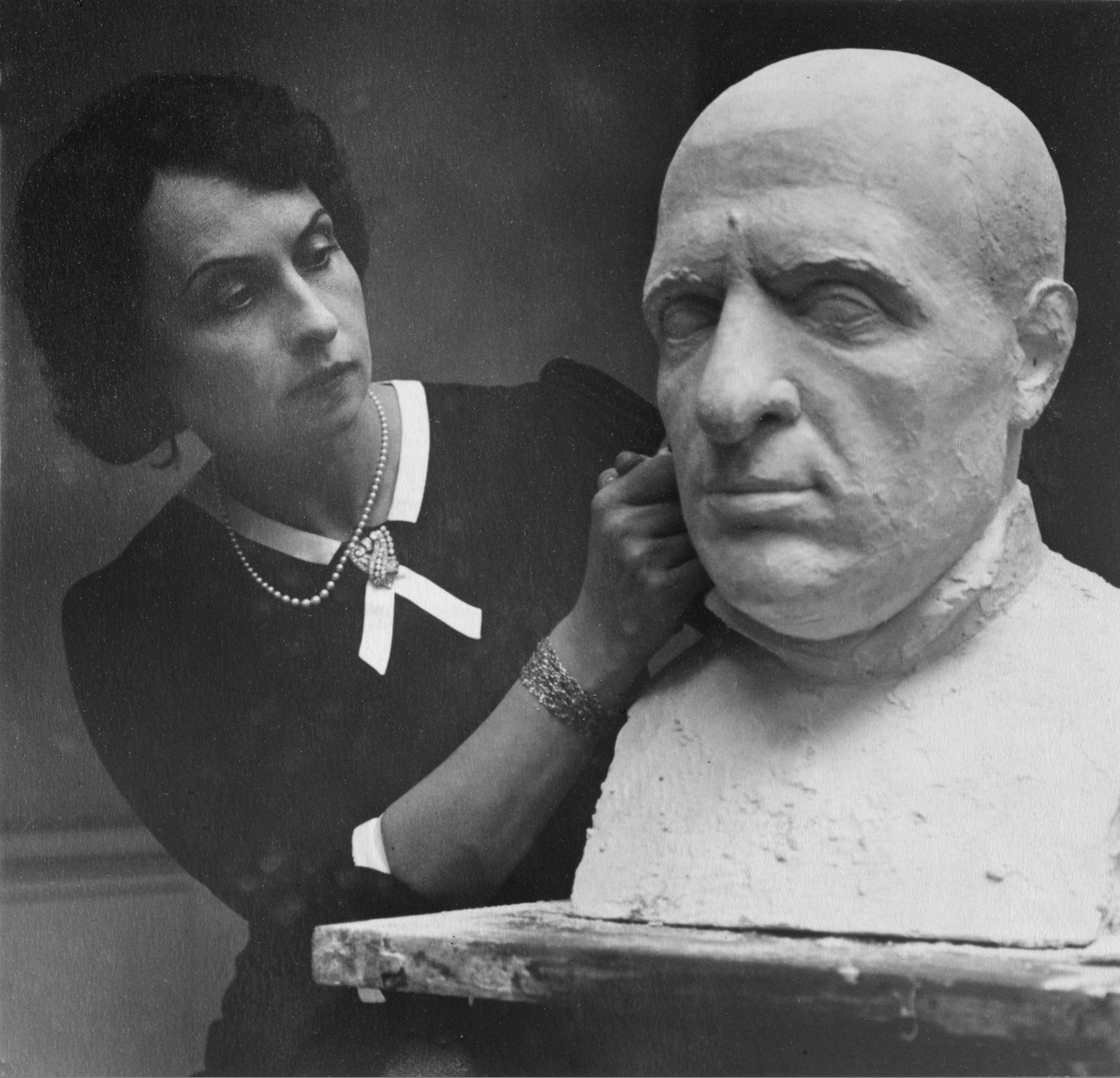
Sigri Welhaven (ca. 1935)

Sigri Welhaven (4 May 1894 – 20 December 1991) was a Norwegian artist and sculptor.

== Biography ==
Welhaven was born in Kristiania (now Oslo), Norway. She was the daughter of Hjalmar Welhaven (1850–1922) and Margrethe Backer (1851–1940), and the sister of the painter Astri Welhaven Heiberg (1881–1967). She studied at the Norwegian National Academy of Craft and Art Industry (later Oslo National Academy of the Arts) and then at the Norwegian National Academy of Fine Arts. She debuted at the Autumn Exhibition at Oslo in 1911.

She lived in Paris from 1919 to 1939. In 1937, her work was exhibited at the International Exposition in Paris. She designed busts of Thorvald Lammers (1916), Halvdan Koht (1939), Sem Sæland (1940) and Hauk Aabel (1945). She also created a number of sculptures featuring wild animals including Gutten på delfinen in bronze from 1921 at Amaldus Nielsens plass in Oslo and Gutten og skilpadden in bronze from 1929 at Torshovsparken in Oslo. She is represented in the National Gallery of Norway with Elefantgruppe from 1965.

== Personal life ==
Welhaven was married three times; in 1913 to Jean Heiberg (1884–1976), in 1920 to Peter Krag (1885–1939), and in 1940 to Carl Pihl Schou (1892–1952). She was the mother of three children.
