= Egil Gade Greve =

Norwegian banker (1930–2025)

- Born: 11 February 1930; Bergen, Norway
- Died: 20 September 2025 (aged 95)
- Occupation: Banker
- Relatives: Tim Greve (brother)
- Awards: Order of St. Olav (1997)

Egil Gade Greve (11 February 1930 – 20 September 2025) was a Norwegian banker.

== Life and career ==
Greve was born in Bergen on 11 February 1930, the son of merchant Arent Wittendorph Greve and Anna Gade, and a brother of Tim Greve. He was CEO of Bergen Bank from 1982, and when Bergen Bank merged with Den norske Creditbank in 1990, he became the first CEO of Den norske Bank, until his retirement in 1991. He was decorated Knight First Class of the Order of St. Olav in 1997, and is Commander of the Order of the Lion of Finland, and Commander of the Order of the Polar Star. Greve died on 20 September 2025, at the age of 95.
