= Michael Sars =

Norwegian theologian and biologist

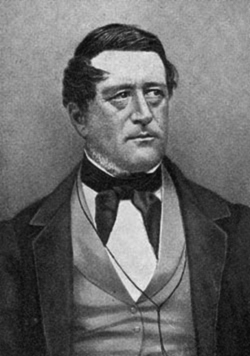
- Born: 30 August 1805; Bergen, Norway
- Died: 22 October 1869 (aged 64); Norway
- Occupations: Theologian, biologist
- Spouse: Maren Welhaven
- Children: 14, including: Ernst Sars; Georg Ossian Sars; Eva Nansen
- Relatives: Odd Nansen (grandson)

Michael Sars (30 August 1805 – 22 October 1869) was a Norwegian theologian and biologist.

== Biography ==
Sars was born in Bergen, Norway. He studied natural history and theology at Royal Frederick University from 1823 and completed a cand.theol. degree in 1828. For several years he taught at a number of different schools, firstly in Christiania (now Oslo) and then in Bergen. In 1831 he was appointed vicar to Kinn Church on the Norwegian north-west coast; eight years later he transferred to Manger, just north of Bergen. Finally, in 1854 he was named professor of zoology at the University of Oslo (at that time Christiania) where he remained for the rest of his life. He died in 1869. He was married to Maren Welhaven, sister of the epic poet Johann Sebastian Welhaven in 1831, and had 7 daughters and 7 sons.

== Work ==
Sars issued his first publication in 1829 – Bidrag til Søedyrenes Naturhistorie ("Contributions to the Natural History of Marine Animals"); a second followed in 1835 – Beskrivelser og Iagttagelser over nogle mærkelige eller nye i Havet ved den Bergenske Kyst levende Dyr af Polypernes, Acalephernes, Radiaternes, Annelidernes og Molluskernes Classer ("Descriptions and Observations of some strange or new animals found off the coast of Bergen, belonging to the ..."). He also issued two large-scale volumes under the title Fauna Littoralis Norvegiae. In all these publications, Sars described new taxa, a routine activity of scientists of the period, but he also described life-histories and reproductive cycles, food and feeding, behaviour and geographical dispersal. The British zoologist Edward Forbes had issued a series of articles on biogeography, claiming that no animal life existed at depths greater than 300 fathoms (550 m). Sars and his colleagues wrote a series of reports issued in various Norwegian journals, where they documented the presence of a number of taxa in Norwegian fjords at depths of up to 450 fathoms (820 m). As a result of one of his dredging expeditions, Sars described the first living stalked crinoid to be described, Rhizocrinus lofotensis. This find spurred academic interest in the deep sea and prompted the Challenger expedition and other similar ventures around the globe. He was also the first to describe the sessile stage of Scyphozoa (jellyfish), and to document the development of molluscs from free-swimming larvae.

Michael Sars was one of the last great descriptive zoologists who catalogued organisms more or less equally successfully in all major animal groups. Sars also described fossils from various fossil beds in Norway and appears to have been keenly interested in all sorts of other issues. Sars was asked by the Parliament of Norway to investigate the biology of Norwegian fisheries, such as the herring and cod fisheries. He had started these investigations by the time of his death, but most of them were completed and published posthumously by his son, Georg Ossian Sars.

He was elected a member of the Royal Swedish Academy of Sciences in 1855.

== Taxa ==
The World Register of Marine Species (WoRMS) lists 260 marine species named by Michael Sars.

== See also ==
- The ship M/S Michael Sars
