= Johan Sebastian Cammermeyer =

Norwegian priest (1730–1819)

Johan Sebastian Cammermeyer (31 March 1730 – 7 February 1819) was a Norwegian priest.

He was born in Copenhagen, and studied at the University of Copenhagen. He graduated with a cand.theol. degree, and moved to Norway in 1754. He was a staunch Pietist and was influenced by Erik Pontoppidan. He is known as a curate in Bergen from 1775 to 1811, and also as the maternal grandfather of the famous poet Johan Sebastian Cammermeyer Welhaven.
