= Johan Sebastian Welhaven =

Norwegian writer (1807–1873)

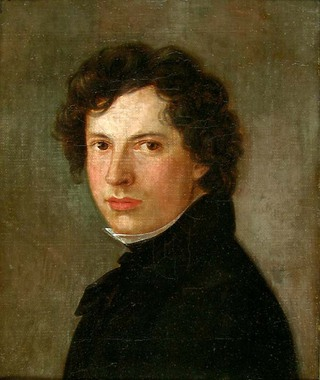
Portrait of Welhaven painted by Jacob Calmeyer, 1827

Johan Sebastian Cammermeyer Welhaven (22 December 1807 – 21 October 1873) was a Norwegian writer, poet, critic, and art theorist. He has been considered "one of the greatest figures in Norwegian literature."

== Background ==
Johan Welhaven was born in Bergen, Norway in 1807. His grandfather, Johan Andrew Welhaven (1748–1811) was a teacher and later assistant to the pastor at St Mary's Church (Mariakirken), which served the city's German community. The author's father, Johan Ernst Welhaven (1775–1828), was a pastor at St. George's Hospital, (St. Jørgens spedalskehospital), while his mother, Else Margaret Cammermeyer, was the daughter of Johan Sebastian Cammermeyer, resident chaplain of Holy Cross Church (Korskirken).

Johan Welhaven was the member of an accomplished family which included his sister socialite Maren Sars, the wife of theologian and biologist Michael Sars (1805–1869), and mother of historian, Ernst Sars (1835–1917), marine biologist Georg Ossian Sars (1837–1927) and mezzo-soprano singer Eva Nansen (1858–1907). Johan Welhaven was himself the father of Norwegian architect Hjalmar Welhaven.

Welhaven attended Bergen Cathedral School from 1817 to 1825. In 1828 he began to study theology under the supervision of his father, but that same year his father died, and thus, Welhaven continued his studies at the university in the capital, where he came to live the rest of his life. After his final exams at the University of Christiania in 1827, he devoted himself to literature.

In 1836 he had visited France and Germany; and in 1858 he went to Italy to study archaeology. In 1840, he was appointed lecturer in philosophy at the Royal Frederik's University in Christiania and delivered a series of lectures on literary subjects.

When in 1843 he obtained an academic job, controversy aroused because he had not even completed his theological degree, and had not published any work of philosophical nature. Wergeland also searched for the position and completed a theological degree and used the illustrations of Creation, Man and the Messiah to show his deep historical and philosophical knowledge. He became professor in 1846.

Afterwards, he spent 26 years lecturing in philosophy at the university from 1840 to 1866. His influence was extended by his appointment as director of the Society of Arts.

He died in Christiania in 1873.

== Career ==
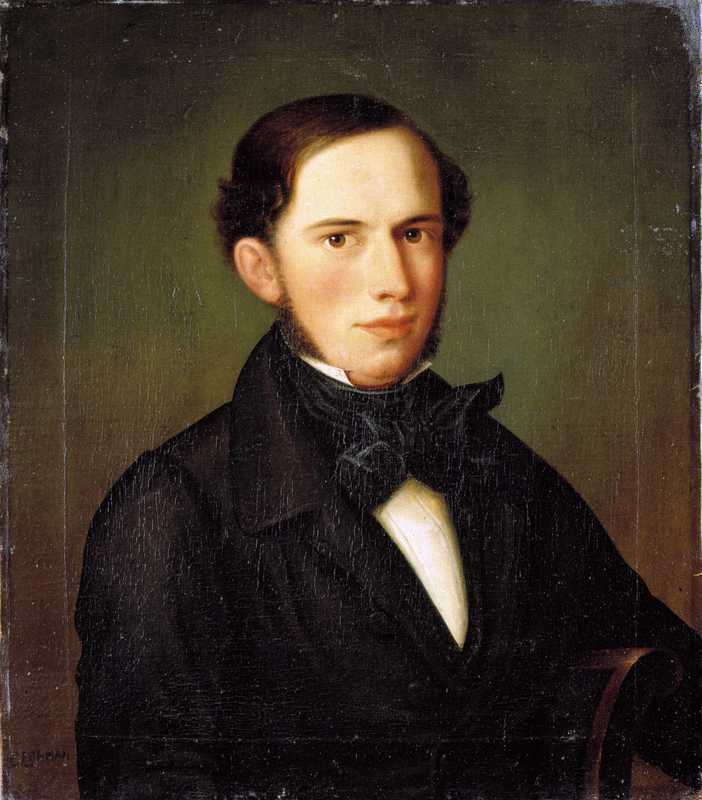
Welhaven, by Carl Peter Lehmann (1842); Oslo Bymuseum.

Welhaven made his name as a representative of conservatism in Norwegian literature in the 19th century. As shown by an attack on Henrik Wergeland's poetry, he opposed the theories of the extreme nationalists. He desired to see Norwegian culture brought into line with that of other European countries, and he himself followed the romantic tradition, being influenced by J.L. Heiberg.

He is known for his feud with Henrik Wergeland and for the poem Republikanerne ("The Republicans"). Welhaven was also romantically involved with Wergeland's younger sister Camilla Collett.

He gave an exposition of his aesthetic creed in the 1834 sonnet cycle Norges Dæmring ("The Dawn of Norway"). He published a volume of Digte ("Poems") in 1839; and in 1845 Nyere Digte ("Newer Poems"). Other poems followed in 1847 Den Salige (The Blessed One), 1848, 1851 and 1859. He was well known for dealing with nature and folklore, such as in «Asgaardsreien» from Nyere Digte, the basis for Peter Nicolai Arbo's painting The Wild Hunt of Odin. He later also became known for poems about religion, like «En Sangers Bøn» (The Prayer of a Singer). In it, he showed his spiritual side, expressing empathy for his fellows human being and pious Christian hope with biblical allusions.

In the 1840s, Welhaven was a figure of the Norwegian national romanticism movement. Welhaven helped in beginning the career of Hans Gude—a romanticist painter—as it was Welhaven who first recommended that Gude should attend the Academy of Art in Düsseldorf.

== Selected works ==
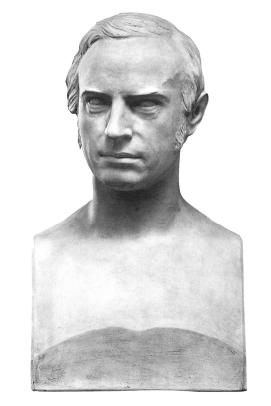
Bust of Johan Welhaven (1867) Nasjonalgalleriet

- Til Henrik Wergeland! (1830)
- Henrik Wergelands Digtekunst og Polemik ved Aktstykker oplyste, (1832)
- Norges Dæmring. Et polemisk Digt, (1834)
- Digte, (1839)
- Nyere Digte, (1845)
- Halvhundrede Digte, (1848)
- Reisebilleder og Digte, (1851)
- En Sjel i Vildmarken, (1856)
- En Digtsamling, (1860)
- Ewald og de norske Digtere, (1863)
- Samlede Skrifter, (1867–68)
- Samlede Digterværker, Jubilæumsutgave I-VI (1907, reissued in 1921)
- Samlede Digterverker I-III, (1945)
- Metaphysik i 100 Paragrafer (lecture manuscript published with comments by A. Aarnes and E.A. Wyller, 1965)
- Samlede verker 1–5 (with introduction and commentary by Ingard Hauge, 1990–1992)

== Sources ==
- Hauge, Ingard Demringens tolker, en essaysamling om Johan Sebastian Welhaven (with Asbjørn Aarnes og Paul Grøtvedt. 1990) ISBN 82-588-0604-1
- Vassdal, Tore Bastian, Johan Sebastian Cammermeyer Welhaven som bergenser og vestlending (2006) ISBN 82-7916-041-8
- Seip, Anne-Lise Demringstid, Johan Sebastian Welhaven og nasjonen (Aschehoug, 2007) ISBN 978-82-03-19237-1
