= Thorvald Lammers =

Norwegian baritone singer, choral conductor, composer and biographer

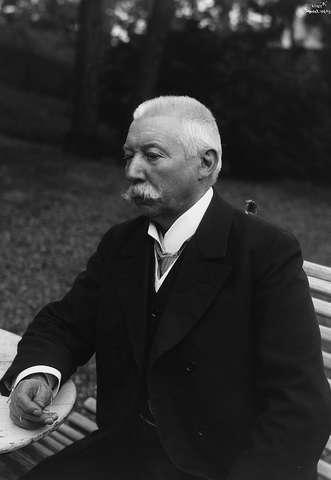
Thorvald Lammers in 1913. Photo:Anders Beer Wilse/Norwegian Museum of Cultural History

Thorvald Lammers (15 January 1841 – 8 February 1922) was a Norwegian baritone singer, choral conductor, composer, and biographer.

Lammers was born in Modum, and made his stage début in Oslo in 1873. He founded the choir known as Korforeningen in 1879, and conducted it until 1909. By around 1900, Lammers was regarded as Norway's most important male singer. Among his compositions are the songs "Gamle Norig" and "Der ligger et land".
