= Georg Ossian Sars =

Norwegian marine and freshwater biologist

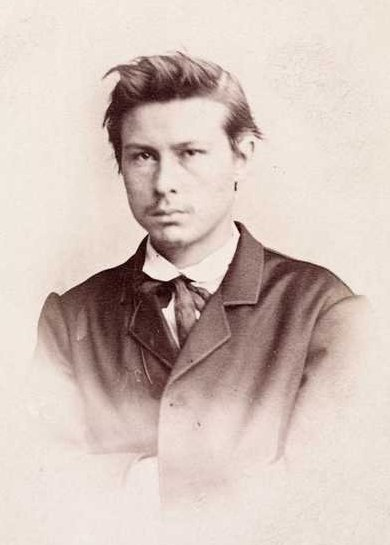
- Georg Ossian Sars, c. 1865
- Born: 20 April 1837; Florø, Norway
- Died: 9 April 1927 (aged 89); Oslo
- Education: University at Christiana (now the University of Oslo)
- Known for: An Account of the Crustacea of Norway, pioneering investigation of ichthyoplankton
- Parents: Michael Sars (father); Maren Sars (mother)
- Relatives: Ernst Sars (brother), Eva Nansen (sister)
- Awards: Linnean Medal
- Scientific career
- Fields: Marine and freshwater biology
- Workplaces: University of Oslo
- Author abbrev. (zoology): G. O. Sars

Georg Ossian Sars HFRSE (20 April 1837 – 9 April 1927) was a Norwegian marine and freshwater biologist. He was a professor of zoology at the University of Oslo from 1874 to 1918. He was a pioneer of Norwegian fisheries research and was involved in establishing hatcheries for marine fish. He wrote a major work on the crustacea of Norway. The Ossian Sars Nature Reserve was named after him.

== Life ==
Georg Ossian Sars was born on 20 April 1837 in Florø, Norway (now part of Kinn Municipality), the son of Pastor Michael Sars and Maren Sars; the historian Ernst Sars was his elder brother, and the singer and women's skiing pioneer Eva Nansen was his younger sister. He grew up in Manger Municipality in Hordaland, where his father was the local priest. He studied from 1852 to 1854 at Bergen Cathedral School, from 1854 at Christiania Cathedral School, and joined the university at Christiana (now the University of Oslo) in 1857. His father was an extraordinary professor of zoology at Oslo in the same period. He indulged his interest in natural history while studying medicine; having collected water fleas in local lakes with Wilhelm Lilljeborg's works, he discovered new species, and this resulted in his first scientific publication. Georg Sars had a good memory and excellent drawing skills, and illustrated some of his father's zoological works.

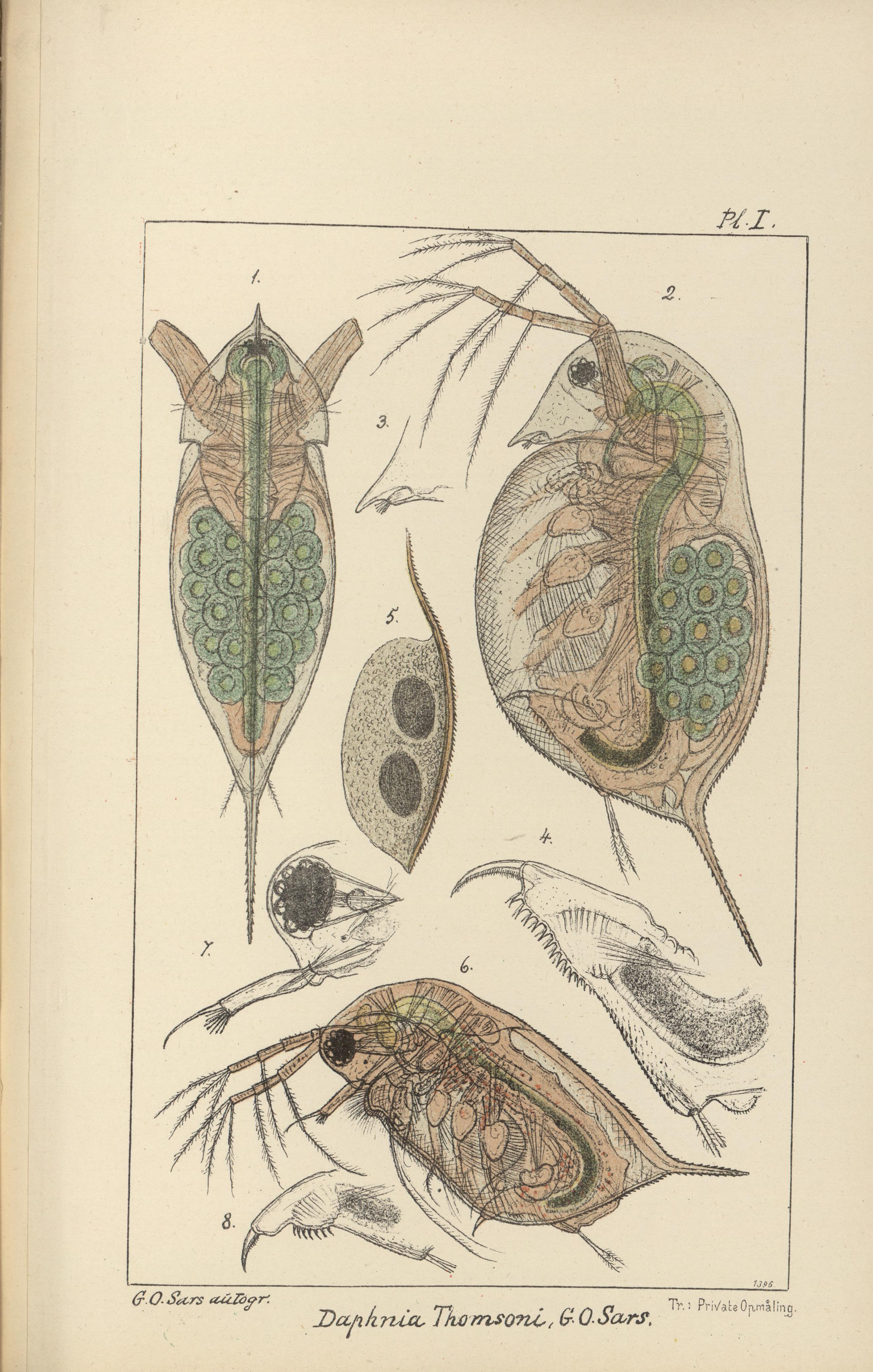
Drawing made by Sars in his book Contributions to the Knowledge of the Fresh-Water Entomostraca of New Zealand. (1894)

Sars was a founding investigator of ichthyoplankton. In 1864, he was commissioned by the Norwegian government to investigate fisheries around the Norwegian coast. One of his first discoveries in Lofoten was that the eggs of cod are pelagic, that is, they inhabit the open water column. In 1865 he demonstrated artificial fertilization of cod eggs. In 1872 he studied herring fisheries. He continued to receive the patronage of the government throughout his career. Sars' primary research focus was on crustaceans and their systematics. In 1876-78 he collaborated with Henrik Mohn and conducted collections aboard the steamship Vøringen. He also worked on the collections made by the Challenger expedition. He described many new species in his career, including in his magnum opus, An Account of the Crustacea of Norway.

Sars became a university fellow in 1870, shortly after the death of his father, and a professor in 1874. In 1876 he was involved in establishing the journal Archiv for Mathematik og Naturvidenskab along with Sophus Lie and Jakob Worm-Müller.

For his achievements, Sars was made a Knight of the Order of St. Olav in 1892, and elevated to Knight-Commander in 1911. He was further awarded the Linnean Medal in 1910.

Georg Ossian Sars never married, and died on 9 April 1927 in Oslo. He is remembered in the scientific names of a number of marine invertebrates, as well as the journal Sarsia, the Sars International Centre for Marine Molecular Biology and the flagship of the Norwegian research fleet, the RV G.O.Sars.

== Publications ==
- An Account of the Crustacea of Norway.
- Sars G. O. (1878). Bidrag til kundskaben om norges arktiske fauna. I. Mollusca regonis arcticae Norwegiae. Oversigt over de i norges arktiske region forekommende bløddyr. Christiania, Brøgger. [University of Oslo].
