= Bare et liv – historien om Fridtjof Nansen =

Just a Life: the Story of Fridtjof Nansen
- Directed by: Sergei Mikaelyan
- Written by: Odd Bang-Hansen; Yuli Dunsky
- Starring: Knut Wigert; Veslemøy Haslund; Rolf Sand; Joachim Calmeyer; Jack Fjeldstad
- Production companies: Lenfilm; Norsk Film
- Release date: October 10, 1968; (Norway)
- Running time: 89 minutes (Norway); 85 minutes (Soviet Union)
- Countries: Norway, Soviet Union
- Languages: Norwegian, Russian

Only One Life: the Story of Fridtjof Nansen (Bokmål: Bare et liv – Historien om Fridtjof Nansen) is a 1968 Norwegian/Soviet biographical drama film directed by Sergei Mikaelyan, starring Knut Wigert and Veslemøy Haslund. The film depicts three important episodes in the life of Fridtjof Nansen (Wigert): his North Pole expedition, his diplomatic work with the League of Nations and his humanitarian work during the 1930s famine in Ukraine.

The title is sometimes translated as Storm Over Catastrophe or Just One Life.

== Cast ==
- Knut Wigert as Fridtjof Nansen
- Veslemøy Haslund as Eva Nansen
- Rolf Sand as Erik Werenskiold
- Joachim Calmeyer as Roald Amundsen
- Jack Fjeldstad as Otto Sverdrup
- Knut Ørvig as Hjalmar Johansen
- Evgeniy Evstigneev as Georgy Chicherin
- Arne Aas as Philip Noel-Baker
- Roy Bjørnstad as Henrik Greve Blessing
- Gunnar Enekjær as Lars Pettersen
- Torgils Moe as Peder Leonard Hendriksen
- Odd-Jan Sandsdalen as Sigurd Scott Hansen
- Richard Svare as Frederick George Jackson
- Annemari Johansen as Liv Nansen
- Yngve Horn as Kåre Nansen
- Tori Liseth as Irmelin Nansen
- Thomas Wollnick as Åsmund Nansen
