= Riksmål Society =

Organization promoting Riksmål, a writing standard of the Norwegian language

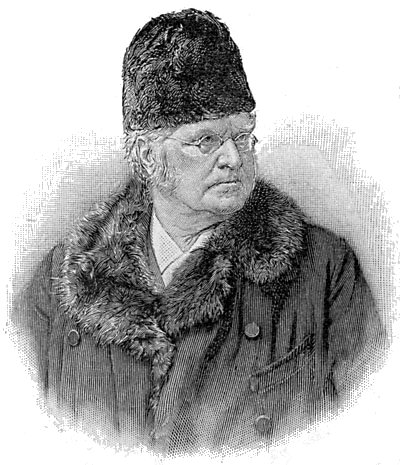
The author and poet Bjørnstjerne Bjørnson founded Riksmålsforbundet in 1907

Riksmålsforbundet (Urban East Norwegian: [ˈrɪ̀ksmoːɫsˌfɔrbʉnə]; official translation: "The Riksmaal Society - The Society for the Preservation of Traditional Standard Norwegian") is the main organisation for Riksmål, an unofficial variety of the Norwegian language, based on the official Bokmål standard as it was before 1938 (see Norwegian language conflict).

The society was founded by subsequent Nobel laureate Bjørnstjerne Bjørnson on April 7, 1907.

== History ==
Although Riksmålsforbundet was founded in 1907 by poet Bjørnstjerne Bjørnson, efforts to organize in support of riksmål date back to 1899. It served as opposition to efforts by Norwegians who were organized to promote landsmål as the single language for the country.

Riksmålsforbundet works to preserve and promote riksmål, a conservative form of written Norwegian, based on the Danish-Norwegian written language tradition. It consistently opposed the government samnorsk (roughly translated "collective Norwegian" or "together Norwegian"; the sam- prefix is related to English same) policy, a now-abandoned project to merge the two main standards of Norwegian (Bokmål and Nynorsk) into one standard that would be used everywhere.

Prominent members of the riksmål movement included the author Jens Bjørneboe, his cousin André Bjerke, Terje Stigen, Carl Keilhau, Agnar Mykle, Arnulf Øverland, Sigurd Hoel, Johan Bernhard Hjort, Knut Wigert, Margrete Aamot Øverland, Sofie Helene Wigert and Varg Vikernes. Among other spokespersons for the riksmål cause are authors such as Claes Gill, Nils Kjær, Knut Hamsun, Gabriel Scott and Henrik Ibsen.

In recent years a series of language reforms, particularly those of 1981 and 2005, have shown that many of the Riksmålsforbundet goals have been achieved. The Samnorsk policy has been officially abandoned. Although not necessarily used by most people, most Riksmål spellings are now considered correct in Bokmål too, after being banned from schools and the government for several decades as a consequence of the Samnorsk policy. The reform of 2005 was not purely a partial reversal of previous reforms; some new spellings were introduced or excluded too, based on actual use. In addition, there is now a political majority in favor of discontinuing mandatory speech policy in Norway.

Riksmålsforbundet publishes the magazine Ordet (“The Word”).

== Leaders ==
- 1907–1910 Bjørnstjerne Bjørnson
- 1910–1911 Ragna Nielsen
- 1911–1916 Alfred Eriksen
- 1916–1918 I. M. Platou
- 1918–1919 Jens Jørgen Mørland
- 1919–1929 Gerhard Holm
- 1929–1936 Ragnar Ullmann
- 1936–1937 Alf Harbitz
- 1939–1945 Harald Bakke
- 1945–1947 Jonas Hestnes
- 1947–1956 Arnulf Øverland
- 1956–1959 Sigurd Hoel
- 1959–1961 Ernst Sørensen
- 1961–1969 Johan Bernhard Hjort
- 1969–1974 Aksel Lydersen
- 1974–1983 Knut Wigert
- 1983–1988 Jan Willoch
- 1988–1990 Erling Granholt
- 1990– Trond Vernegg
