= Wigert =

Wigert is a surname. Notable people with the surname include:

- Carl Severin Wigert (1871–1941), Swedish mathematician
- Knut Wigert (1916–2006), Norwegian actor
- Sofie Helene Wigert (1913–1989), Norwegian ship owner, Riksmål activist, and magazine editor
- Sonja Wigert (1913–1980), Norwegian-Swedish actress
