= Aasmund Brynildsen =

Norwegian essayist, biographer, and editor

- Born: 16 October 1917; Tjøme Municipality, Norway
- Died: 19 June 1974 (aged 56)
- Occupations: Essayist; biographer; magazine editor; publishing house consultant
- Spouse: Karin Bang (m. 1952)
- Relatives: Alf Larsen (uncle)
- Awards: Riksmål Society Literature Prize (1973)

Aasmund Brynildsen (16 October 1917 – 19 June 1974) was a Norwegian essayist, biographer, magazine editor and publishing house consultant.

== Personal life ==
Brynildsen was born in Tjøme Municipality to shipmaster Lars Christian Holm Brynildsen and Lilly Kristine Larsen, and was a nephew of Alf Larsen. After passing examen artium in 1937, he studied philosophy and literary history at the University of Oslo, though without graduating. He was married twice, first to Ruth Bülov from 1941 to 1945, and second to writer Karin Bang, whom he married in 1952.

== Career ==
During the 1930s, Brynildsen wrote a number of essayistic articles in the magazine Janus, starting with an article on the art of Pablo Picasso ("Pablo Picassos urbillede") in 1935. His first books were Der er en kilde from 1945, and Dommen til døden from 1946. He co-edited the anthroposophical magazine Spektrum from 1950 to 1954. He was assigned with the publishing house Dreyer, as translator, author and principal consultant. He wrote articles for newspaper and magazines, in particular for Morgenbladet and Farmand. He issued several essays collections, including Det nye hjerte og andre essays (1960), Fornuft og besettelse (1963), Fra Chartres til Eidsvold (1970), Utvalgte essays (1970), and Svermeren og hans demon (1973), a collection of four essays on the writer Knut Hamsun. He published two poetry collections, Hvem våker from 1968 and Bønn til en bokfink from 1975, and the memoir book Hudø. Bilder fra en barndom from 1974.

Brynildsen was a member of the Norwegian Academy for Language and Literature from 1968. He was awarded the Riksmål Society Literature Prize in 1973.
