= Paal Brekke =

Norwegian writer

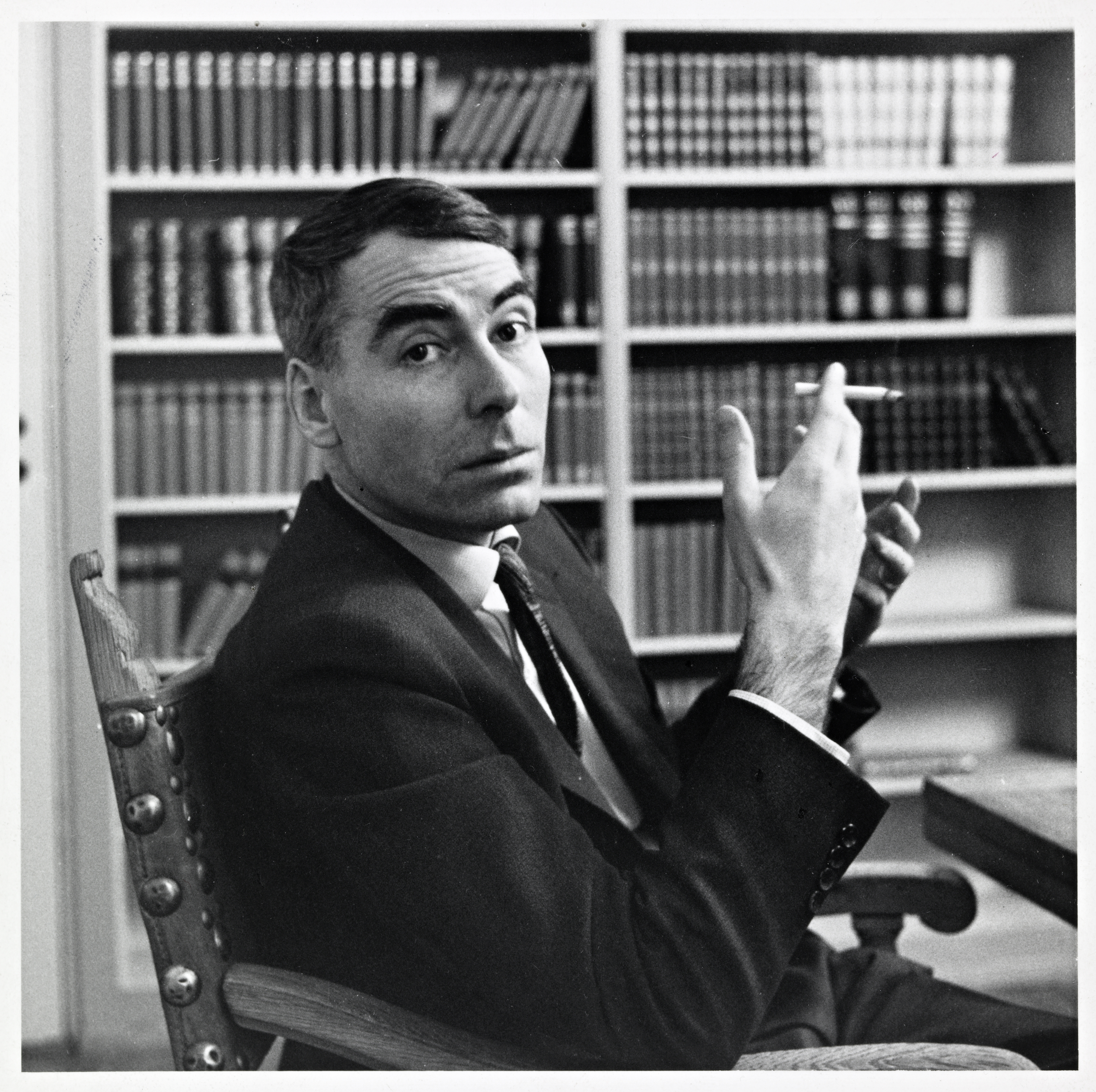
- Portrait of Brekke, Nasjonalbiblioteket collection.
- Born: 17 September 1923
- Died: 2 December 1993 (aged 70)
- Occupation: poet
- Known for: pioneer of modernism in Norway

Paal Brekke (17 September 1923 – 2 December 1993) was a Norwegian lyricist, novelist, translator of poetry, and literary critic. Brekke fled from occupied Norway to Sweden in 1940, when he was 17 years old. He made his literary debut in 1942, with the poetry collection Av din jord er vi til (From thy soil we exist). His first novel was På flukt (On the run, 1946).

Brekke has been called the father of modernism in Norway. He was awarded the Norwegian Critics Prize for Literature in 1972 for the poetry collection Aftenen er stille (Quiet is the evening). He received the Dobloug Prize in 1981.

== Biography ==
As a young refugee Brekke became familiar with modern Swedish poetry. He returned to Norway in 1945, and issued the collection Jeg gikk så lange veier (1945). The novel På flukt (1946) is describing a failed attempt to reach England during the war. Later collections are Skyggefektning (1949), and Løft min krone, vind fra intet (1957). Brekke's contributions to modernist poetry in the 1960s are the collection Det skjeve smil i rosa (1965), poetry combined with political sarcasm, and Granatmannen kommer (poems and other texts, 1968). In the 1970s he issued Aftenen er stille (1972), for which he received the critics prize, Syng, ugle (1978), and Flimmer. Og strek (1980). Late in his life he released the two collections Men barnet i meg spør (1992) and Ostinato (1994, posthumous).

Brekke was soon noticed for his orientation towards modern European poetry, both as poet and critic. He asked for a renewal of Norwegian poetry, and spread knowledge of foreign literature through translations of English modernist writers like T.S.Eliot, and also Indian and Japanese poetry. In the mid 1950s Brekke participated in the debate on lyrical form, and opposed André Bjerke and Arnulf Øverland in the so-called Glossolalia debate.

The travel book En munnfull av Ganges (1962) is written after a visit to India in 1960, where Brekke was faced with poverty and hunger in the third world, and became aware of the underlying conflicts between rich and poor nations.

== Selected works ==
- Av din jord er vi til (1942)
- Fri är du född (1943)
- Landflyktig soldat (1945)
- Jeg gikk så lange veier (1945)
- På flukt (1946)
- Skyggefektning (1949)
- Aldrende Orfeus (1951)
- Og hekken vokste kjempehøy (1953)
- Løft min krone, vind fra intet (1957)
- Roerne fra Itaca (1960)
- En munnfull av Ganges (1962)
- De skjeve smil i rosa (1965)
- Granatamannen kommer (1968)
- Aftenen er stille (1972)
- Syng, ugle (1978)
- Flimmer. Og strek (1980)

=== Translations ===
- T.S.Eliot: Det golde landet og andre dikt (1949)
- Amerikansk lyrikk (1957)
- Moderne japansk lyrikk (1965)
- Indisk lyrikk (1979)

== Awards ==
- Norwegian Critics Prize for Literature 1972
- Dobloug Prize 1981
- Riksmål Society Literature Prize 1992
