= Øistein Parmann =

Norwegian journalist, teacher, biographer and art historian

Øistein Parmann (10 March 1921 – 8 February 1999) was a Norwegian journalist, teacher, biographer and art historian. He served as the publishing director in Dreyers Forlag from 1975 until 1988.

== Background ==
Parmann was born in Kristiania (now Oslo), Norway. His parents were Øistein Parmann (1883-1956) and Aud Petra Katharina Amundsen (1898-1976). His father operated a bookstore in Oslo. He grew up in Aker and graduated artium at Ullern in 1940. He then studied art history and literature at the University of Oslo. He was married in 1945 to physiotherapist Elsie Solveig Jacobsen. He died in February 1999 at Nesodden in Akershus.

== Career ==
He made his literary debut in 1943 with Kanskje dette – Av en ung manns skissebok. He continued his writer's activities and marked himself as an art historian. He wrote novels and art history as well as biographies of anthroposophist Marcello Haugen (1974), artist Harald Dal (1975), painter Halfdan Egedius (1979) and architect Herman Major Schirmer (1986). He also edited and published essays by poet Alf Larsen and in 1980 he edited and published the diaries of Maria Quisling, widow of Vidkun Quisling.

He was a journalist at Morgenbladet from 1948 and later served as cultural editor. He began a seven year career as a teacher at the Rudolf Steinskolen in Oslo during 1959. The pinnacle of his working career was as publishing director of the publishing house Dreyers Forlag from 1974 to 1988 and praeses in the Norwegian Academy for Language and Literature from 1982 to 1988. He was also a Government scholar from 1986.

== Selected works ==
- Marcello Haugen (Oslo: Cappelen) ISBN 82-92478-02-7 (1974)
- Harald Dal (Oslo: Gyldendal) ISBN 978-8205084629 (1975)
- Halfdan Egedius: Liv og verk (Oslo:Dreyer) ISBN 978-8209017531 (1979)
- Herman Major Schirmer og Tegneskolen: Et stykke norsk arkitekturhistorie (Oslo: Grøndahl og Dreyer) ISBN 9788209102732 (1986)
