= Ernst Sørensen =

Norwegian schoolteacher and writer (1903–1972)

- Born: 19 August 1903; Tønsberg
- Died: 24 January 1972 (aged 68)
- Occupations: Schoolteacher, essayist, journalist, magazine editor and language activist
- Spouse: Rakel Solberg (m. 1932)

Ernst Sørensen (19 August 1903 – 24 January 1972) was a Norwegian schoolteacher, essayist, journalist, magazine editor and language activist.

== Personal life ==
Born in Tønsberg on 19 August 1903, Sørensen was son of banker Sigval Sørensen and Oline Marie Olsen. He was the first husband of politician Rakel Seweriin (née Solberg), whom he married in 1932.

== Career ==
Sørensen lectured at the Bergen Waldorf School from 1935 to 1949. He edited the magazine Spektrum from 1949 to 1954, and the magazine Horisont from 1958 to 1965. He chaired the Riksmål Society from 1959 to 1961. Among his books are Demringen from 1946, and the essay collection Tegn i sol og måne from 1963.
