= Dare not to sleep =

1936 poem by Arnulf Øverland

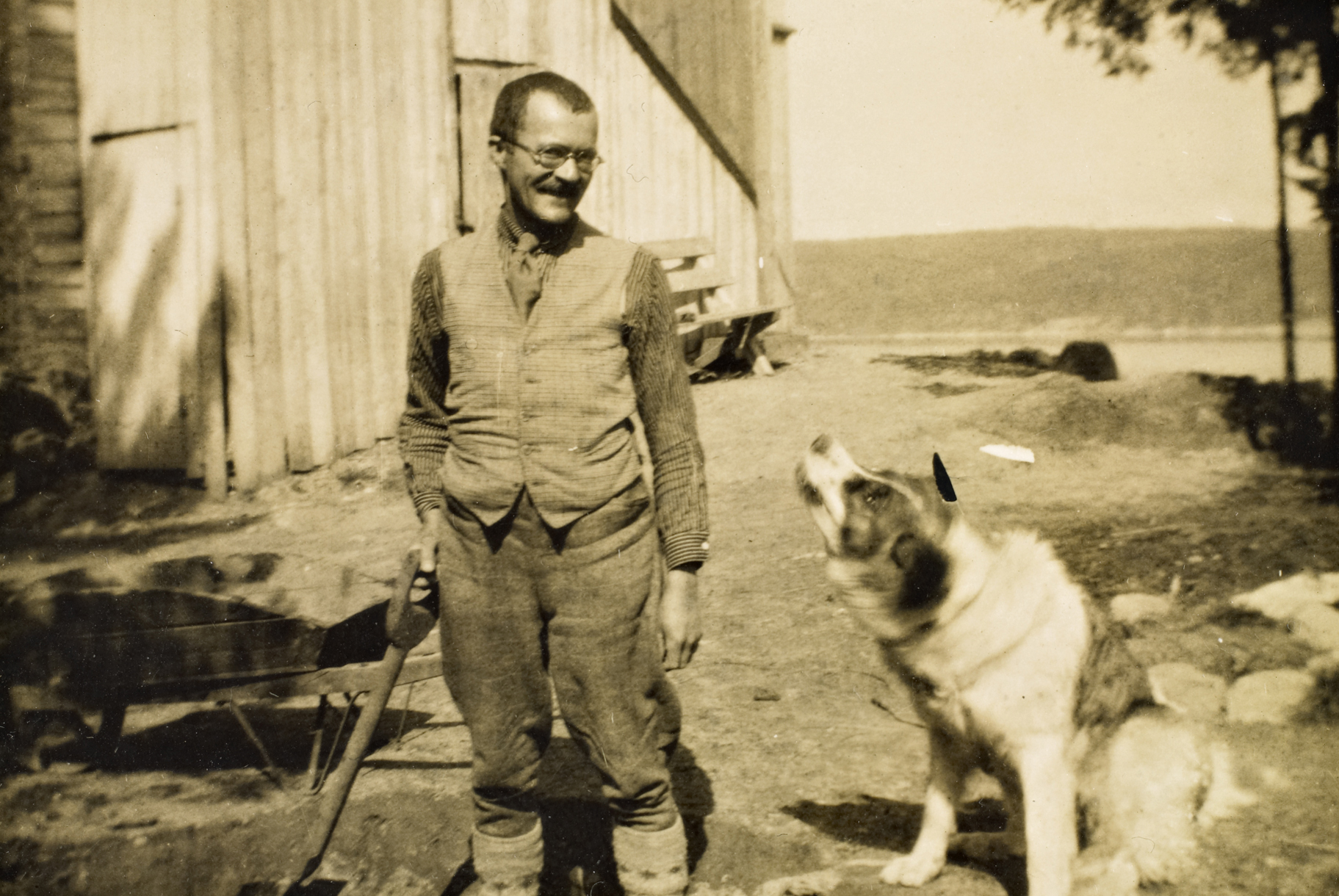

"Dare not to sleep" (Norwegian: "Du må ikke sove!") is a poem written by Arnulf Øverland. The poem was first published in the magazine Samtiden in 1937, and included in the poetry collection Den Røde Front from 1937.

It is about the Nazism and Fascism's onward march in Europe – a warning against indifference, human contempt and a warning against what would happen. In this poem Øverland mentions Hitler by name.
