= Harald Dal =

Norwegian painter (1902–1972)

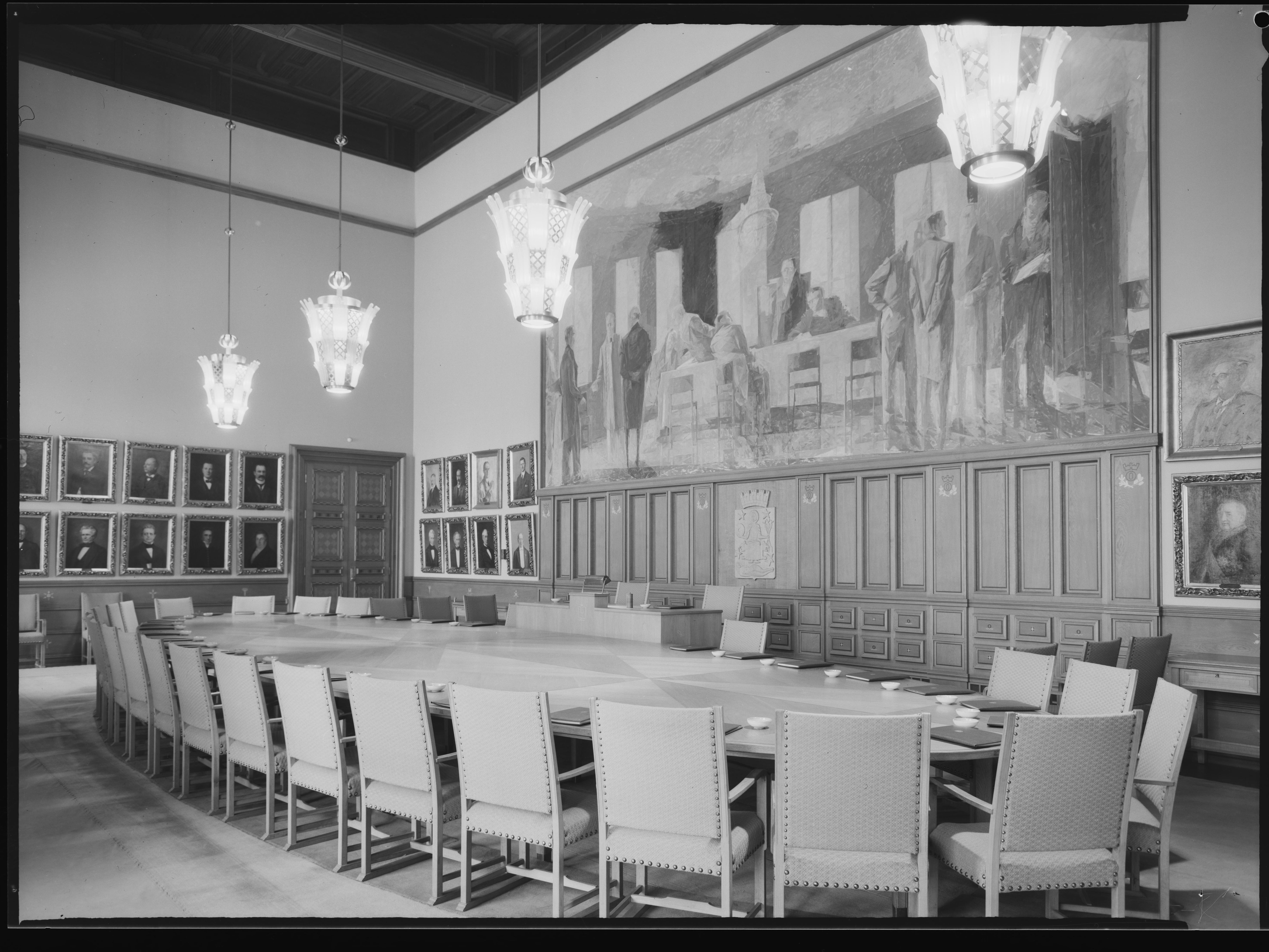
Harald Dal's monumental De eligerede mænd (The Elected Men) was painted from 1949 to 1957. It is regarded as the artist's main work and hangs in the Presidency Hall in Oslo City Hall.

Harald Dal (June 26, 1902 – June 4, 1972) was a Norwegian painter. After a lengthy education both in Norway and abroad, he debuted as a painter at an exhibition in Oslo's Kunstnerforbundet art gallery in 1927.

Dal was born in Trondheim. He was especially active as a landscape painter and portrait painter. He received a number of grants and awards, and made a number of international trips to develop as an artist. He worked slowly and methodically, and has therefore left a limited artistic production. He had a close friendship and collaboration with Ingeborg Refling Hagen and her circle, and was one of the artists that decorated Stein School in Nes, which is now a museum. Among other things, he painted a scene from the old Norse sagas in the hall at the school.

The painting De eligerede mænd (The Elected Men) is considered Dal's chief work. The painting was created between 1949 and 1957 for display in Oslo City Hall, and it depicts the twelve men that constituted the first council of Christiania (now Oslo). The artist's last major assignment was created for the Royal Palace in Oslo between 1955 and 1960, and it depicts Haakon VII taking his oath as king.

In 1975, the author and art historian Øistein Parmann published a volume about Harald Dal in the book series Kunst og Kultur (Art and Culture).
