= Rakel Seweriin =

Norwegian politician (1906–1995)

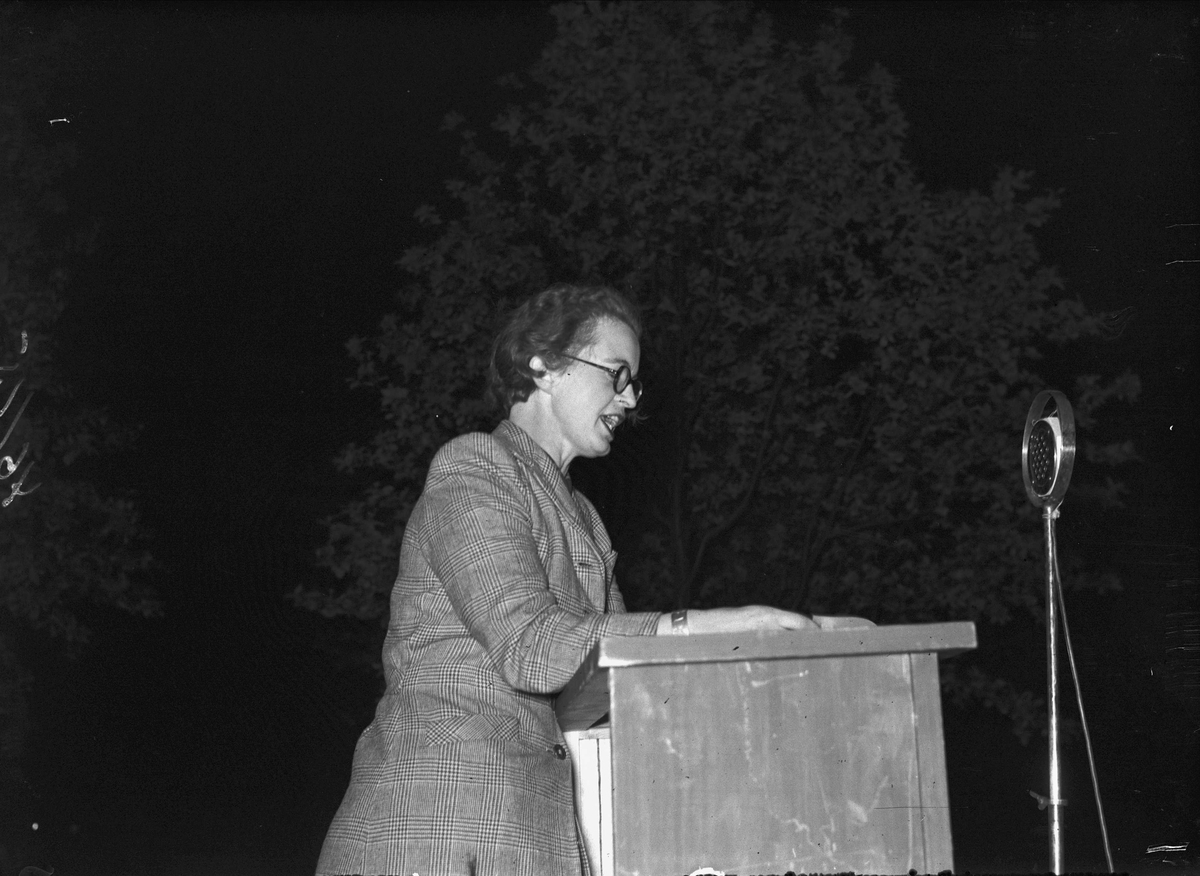
- Seweriin in 1946.

Minister of Social Affairs
- In office 2 November 1953 – 1 August 1955
- Prime Minister: Oscar Torp; Einar Gerhardsen
- Preceded by: Aaslaug Aasland
- Succeeded by: Gudmund Harlem

Personal details
- Born: Rakel Solberg; 26 June 1906 Hof, Vestfold, Norway
- Died: 17 September 1995 (aged 89) Oslo, Norway
- Party: Labour
- Spouse(s): Ernst Sørensen (1932–1937); Alf Christian Seweriin (1937–1995; her death)

Rakel Seweriin, née Solberg (26 June 1906 – 17 September 1995) was a Norwegian politician for the Labour Party. She was the Norwegian Minister of Social Affairs from 1953 to 1955.

She was born in Hof as a daughter of Casper Fredrik Solberg (1870–1932) and Zefra Eliagna Natterstad (1871–1949). She grew up in Eidsfoss, where her father managed Eidsfoss Station. Her mother was a hotelier. She commenced her studies in 1926, and took courses as a stenographer in 1927 and 1928. From 1929 she worked as a stenographer, in 1942 she left Norway due to World War II. She and her husband had been active members of the Norwegian resistance movement, among others starting the illegal newspaper Fri Fagbevegelse. She continued her work abroad, as a stenographer for the exiled Norwegian High Command in London. She was also a member of the program council of the exiled part of the Norwegian Broadcasting Corporation, from 1943 to 1945.

Seweriin had been a member of Oslo city council from 1937 until the war broke out, and also served briefly in 1945. She was the deputy leader of the Workers' Youth League from 1937 to 1946. After the war she was a member of the Labour Party secretariat for women from 1945 to 1971—from 1953 to 1963 she chaired the secretariat, and was a member of the Labour Party's central committee. She was elected as a member of the Parliament of Norway in 1945 from the constituency Oslo, and was re-elected in 1949, 1953, 1957, 1961 and 1965. In August 1949, she was one of only ten women accredited to the first ever meeting of the Council of Europe's Parliamentary Assembly in Strasbourg, from a total of 188 parliamentarians.

On 2 November 1953, she temporarily stepped out of parliament as she became Minister of Social Affairs in Torp's Cabinet. She had worked with social policy as a parliamentarian, but in an interview with Trond Nordby she confessed to having lacked a clear purpose with her position as Minister of Social Affairs. Legislative work in the ministry slowed, and as leader of the ministry she was clearly dominated by the bureaucrat staff, especially Karl Evang. She continued as Minister of Social Affairs until 1 August 1955, a few months after the formation of Gerhardsen's Third Cabinet. During this time, her seat in parliament was filled by Hjalmar Larsen, Aase Lionæs and Gunnar Alf Larsen. When she stepped down in 1969, her time of 24 years as a parliament member was a record for a woman in Norway.

Seweriin was also a member of the board of the Norwegian Directorate of Labour from 1947 to 1953 and 1955 to 1967, and of the Norwegian National Opera from 1957. She was a member of several public committees, among others commenting on existing laws. From 1963 to 1971 she chaired Landslaget for språklig samling.

Rakel Seweriin was married twice, first to teacher, journalist and writer Ernst Samuel Sørensen (1903–1972), then, from 1937, to physician Alf Christian Seweriin (1909–1961). She died in September 1995 in Oslo.

Political offices
Preceded by Aslaug Aasland	Norwegian Minister of Social Affairs; 1953–1955	Succeeded by Gudmund Harlem
