= Glossolalia debate =

1950s debate on modernist poetry

The Glossolalia debate (Norwegian: Tungetaledebatten) was a literary debate on modernist poetry in Norway in the 1950s. The debate started with Arnulf Øverland's nationwide touring with the speech Tungetale fra Parnasset (English: Glossolalia from the Parnassus) in 1953, characterizing modernist literature as babble and nonsense. His talk was published in Arbeiderbladet in 1954, and resulted in a fierce debate. Among the defenders of modernist poetry were Odd Solumsmoen, Olav Dalgard and Paal Brekke, while poet and literary critic André Bjerke joined Øverland's criticism.

The glossolalia debate was discussed in the literary magazine Profil in 1968.
