= Aksel Lydersen =

Norwegian chemical engineer (1919–1995)

Aksel L. Lydersen (22 February 1919 – 1 September 1995) was a Norwegian engineer and professor in chemical engineering at the Norwegian Institute of Technology (Norwegian: Norges tekniske høgskole, NTH). He developed the Lydersen method, a technique to estimate thermodynamic properties. He was also active in the Norwegian language conflict (målstriden, språkstriden or sprogstriden) and was leader of the Riksmål Society in Norway 1969 to 1974.

== Family ==
He father was Stian Lydersen (1882 to 1939) who was captain in the Norwegian merchant fleet, and Lene Marie Lydersen (1886 to 1978). Lydersen married Ragnhild Haugen (1919 to 1998) in 1946. Their children are Lars Lydersen (born 1947) and Stian Lydersen (born 1957).

== Background and education ==
Lydersen grew up in the coastal village Narestø in Flosta Municipality in Aust-Agder county. He completed examen artium in 1938. In 1943 he graduated with a master's degree in engineering from the Machine Department at NTH. He then worked as an assistant for professor Adolf Watzinger at NTH for three years. Next, he was employed at Kværner Brug in Oslo for two years. He returned to NTH in 1948, where he taught refrigeration engineering, and completed the degree of Doctor Technicae (dr.techn.) in 1950.

== Scientific work ==
Chemical engineering had developed as a discipline of its own in the United States since around 1900, based on needs in industry. For many years, NTH followed the German tradition, where machine engineers carried out such tasks. But after World War II, NTH oriented itself more towards USA. In 1949, NTH established its own Department of Chemical Engineering. Sven G. Terjesen, who was second cousin of Lydersen, was the first professor at the department. He encouraged Lydersen to qualify for a scientific position in the new discipline. In 1952 to 1955, Lydersen worked with professor Olaf H. Hougen at University of Wisconsin in Madison. Hougen had established one of the world's leading centers for chemical engineering. Lydersen and Hougen became good friends, and started a long lasting cooperation between the chemical engineering departments in Trondheim and Madison. During his stay in the US, Lydersen was also employed at Miller Brewing Company in Milwaukee for a shorter period.

While in the United States, Lydersen developed a method for the estimation of critical properties for temperature (T_{c}), pressure (P_{c}) and volume (V_{c}), based on already published data. This method is a group contribution method, and is also referred to as the Lydersen method. Determination of physical data became a central research activity when he returned to NTH, now also based on his own measurements. The results are published in chemical engineering handbooks.

He received a position at NTH as docent in 1955, and full professor from 1958. He authored or co-authored several publications on determination of enthalphy and vapour pressure for organic substances. Lydersen had several patents. He authored one textbook in chemical engineering in Norwegian, and two textbooks in English: Fluid flow and heat transfer from 1979, Mass transfer in engineering practice from 1983, and an English/French/German/Spanish Dictionary of chemical engineering from 1992.

He received the Distinguished Service Citation Award at University of Wisconsin in 1980.

== The Norwegian language conflict ==
The Norwegian language conflict (språkstriden or sprogstriden) is a controversy within Norwegian culture and politics related to the two written versions of the Norwegian language: Bokmål and Nynorsk. Local communities organized referendums to decide the language version in the local elementary schools. Lydersen strongly felt that it would be more just to let the parents decide this. He became an active member of the Riksmål Society (Riksmålforbundet), as a board member (1958–1975) and leader (1969–1974). He was a member of the Vogt-committee 1964–1966, and the Language council of Norway (Norsk Språkråd) 1972–1994.

== Publications ==
- Untersuchungen über Wärmeübergang und Druckfall in Kugelstapeln beim Durchblasen von Luft. Mit Anwendung auf das Gefrieren von Nahrungsmitteln in Luftstrom, dr.avh., Trondheim 1950
- Fra sprogstridens historie, 1965
- Kjemiteknikk, Trondheim 1972
- Fluid flow and heat transfer, Wiley, Chichester 1979
- Mass transfer in engineering practice, Wiley, Chichester 1983
- Ordbok for kjemiteknikk (sm.m. I. Dahlø), Trondheim 1988
- Dictionary of chemical engineering (sm.m. I. Dahlø), Chichester 1992

Cultural offices
Preceded by Johan Bernhard Hjort	Leader of the Riksmål Society; 1969–1974	Succeeded by Knut Wigert
