= Spektrum (magazine) =

Norwegian literary and cultural magazine

- Editor: Editors Carl Fredrik Engelstad; Hans Peter L'Orange; Ernst Sørensen; Aasmund Brynildsen; Barthold A. Butenschøn
- Categories: Literature, art, society
- Frequency: bi-monthly
- First issue: 1946
- Final issue: 1954
- Country: Norway
- Based in: Oslo
- Language: Norwegian

Spektrum was a Norwegian literary, art and cultural magazine, issued from 1946 to 1954. Its first editors were Carl Fredrik Engelstad and Hans Peter L'Orange, and from 1949 Ernst Sørensen, with Aasmund Brynildsen and Barthold A. Butenschøn as co-editors. Among contributors to the magazine were André Bjerke, Jens Bjørneboe, Karl Brodersen and Øistein Parmann. The magazine was based in Oslo.
