= Veslemøy Haslund =

Norwegian actress (1939–2005)

- Born: 8 April 1939; Oslo, Norway
- Died: 7 November 2005 (aged 66)
- Occupation: Actress

Veslemøy Haslund (8 April 1939 – 7 November 2005) was a Norwegian actress and stage producer. She made her stage debut at Trøndelag Teater in 1959. She was later assigned to various theatres, including Det Norske Teatret, Fjernsynsteatret, Nationaltheatret and Teater Ibsen.

== Career ==
Born in Oslo on 8 April 1939, Haslund made her stage debut at Trøndelag Teater in 1959, in the play Five Finger Exercise. She stayed with Trøndelag Teater from 1959 to 1961, and was appointed ar Det Norske Teatret from 1961 to 1969, and thereafter at Fjernsynsteatret from 1965 to 1969.

She was assigned to Nationaltheatret from 1969 to 1984. In 1969 she played in Et spill om pugg. In 1971 she played in Bjørn Nilsen's documentary drama Svartkatten. She further played in Klaus Hagerup’s Kuler i solnedgang in 1972, and Ludvig Holberg’s comedy Den politiske kandestøper. In 1974 she played two feminist plays, first in Bjørg Vik’s play To akter for fem kvinner, and later in the play Jenteloven.

From 1985 she was assigned to Teater Ibsen.

She trained at RADA and made her film debut in 1967, in Det største spillet, and further contributed to various films, including Bare et liv from 1968 depicting important episodes in the life of Fridtjof Nansen, Marikens bryllup from 1972, Vårnatt from 1976, Formyndere from 1979, and Kristin Lavransdatter from 1995.

Haslund died on 7 November 2005, at the age of 66.
