= Arnulf Øverland =

Norwegian poet and artist (1889–1968)

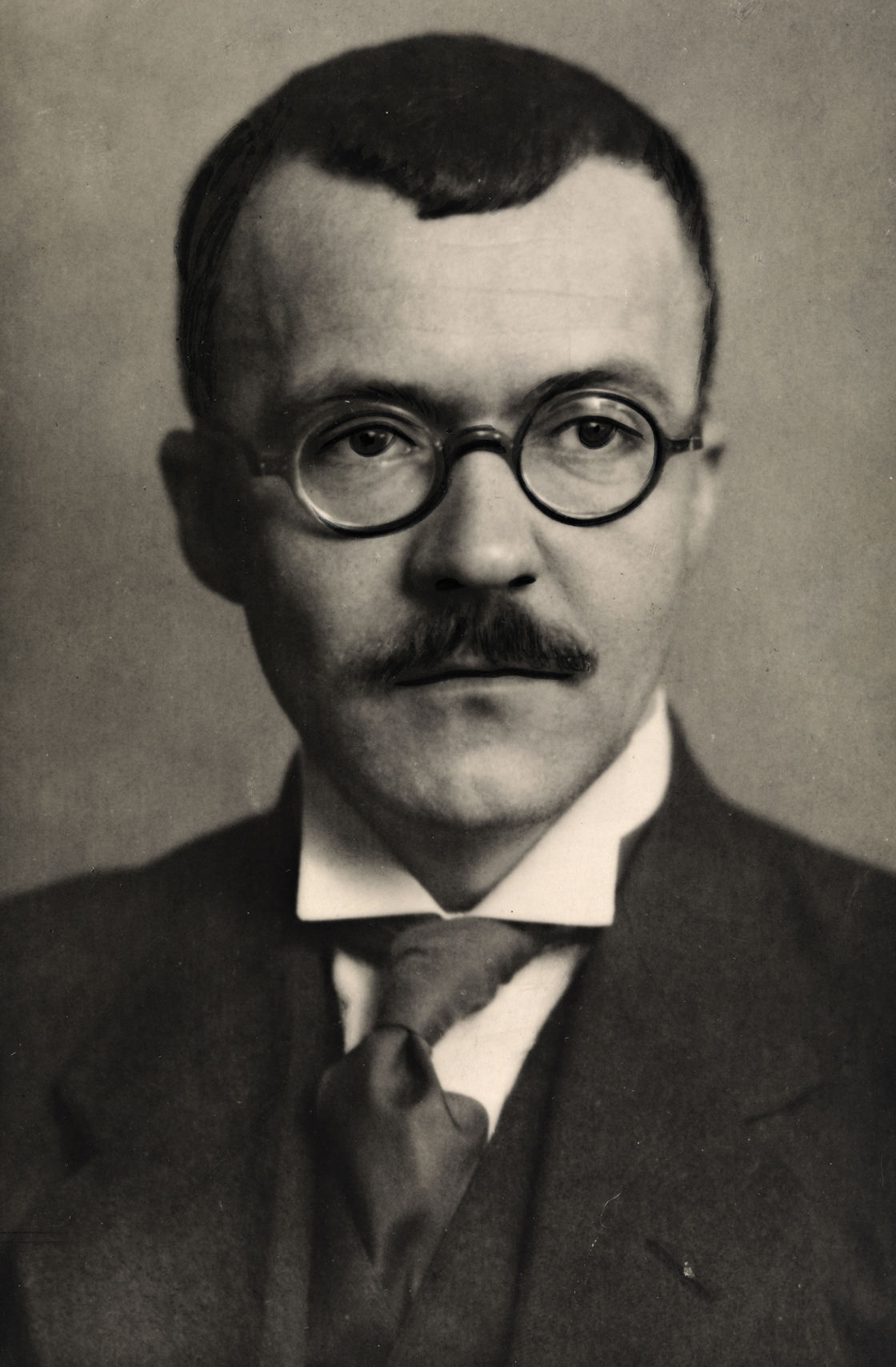
Portrait of Arnulf Øverland. Postcard in the collection of the National Library of Norway

Ole Peter Arnulf Øverland (27 April 1889 – 25 March 1968) was a Norwegian poet and artist. He is principally known for his poetry which served to inspire the Norwegian resistance movement during the German occupation of Norway during World War II.

== Biography ==
Øverland was born in Kristiansund and raised in Bergen. His parents were Peter Anton Øverland (1852–1906) and Hanna Hage (1854–1939). The early death of his father, left the family economically stressed. He was able to attend Bergen Cathedral School and in 1904 Kristiania Cathedral School. He graduated in 1907 and for a time studied philology at University of Kristiania.

Øverland published his first collection of poems (1911). Øverland became a communist sympathizer from the early 1920s and became a member of Mot Dag. He also served as chairman of the Norwegian Students' Society 1923–28. He changed his stand in 1937, partly as an expression of dissent against the ongoing Moscow Trials. He was an avid opponent of Nazism and in 1936 he wrote the poem "Du må ikke sove" which was printed in the journal Samtiden. It ends with Jeg tenkte: Nu er det noget som hender. Vår tid er forbi - Europa brenner. ("I thought:: Something is imminent . Our era is over – Europe's on fire!"). Probably the most famous line of the poem is Du må ikke tåle så inderlig vel den urett som ikke rammer deg selv! ("You mustn't endure so sincerely well the injustice that doesn't affect yourself!").

During the German occupation of Norway from 1940 in World War II, he wrote to inspire the Norwegian resistance movement. He wrote a series of poems which were clandestinely distributed, leading to the arrest of both him and his future wife Margrete Aamot Øverland in 1941. Arnulf Øverland was held first in the prison camp of Grini before being transferred to Sachsenhausen concentration camp in Germany. He spent a four-year imprisonment until the liberation of Norway in 1945. His poems were later collected in Vi overlever alt and published in 1945.

Øverland played an important role in the Norwegian language struggle in the post-war era. He became a noted supporter for the conservative written form of Norwegian called Riksmål, he was president of Riksmålsforbundet (an organization in support of Riksmål) from 1947 to 1956. In addition, Øverland adhered to the traditionalist style of writing, criticising modernist poetry on several occasions. His speech Tungetale fra parnasset, published in Arbeiderbladet in 1954, initiated the so-called Glossolalia debate.

== Personal life ==
In 1918, he married the singer Hildur Arntzen (1888–1957). Their marriage was dissolved in 1939. In 1940, he married Bartholine Eufemia Leganger (1903–1995). They separated shortly after, and were officially divorced in 1945. Øverland married the journalist Margrete Aamot Øverland (1913–1978) in June 1945. In 1946, the Norwegian Parliament arranged for Arnulf and Margrete Aamot Øverland to reside at the Grotten. He lived there until his death in 1968 and she lived there for another ten years until her death in 1978.

Arnulf Øverland was buried at Vår Frelsers Gravlund in Oslo. Joseph Grimeland designed the bust of Arnulf Øverland (bronze, 1970) at his grave site.

== Famous quotes ==
- "For a "monotheistic" religion it should be sufficient with three gods."
- "What is there to be said about a Church which certainly promises its believers eternal salvation, but at the same time condemns the non-believers, all those who think differently, to an eternal torment in hell? – If that Church absolutely must talk about love, then it should do so very quietly."

== Selected works ==
- Den ensomme fest (1911)
- Berget det blå (1927)
- En Hustavle (1929)
- Den røde front (1937)
- Vi overlever alt (1945)
- Sverdet bak døren (1956)
- Livets minutter (1965)

== Awards ==
- Gyldendal's Endowment (1935)
- Dobloug Prize (1951)
- Mads Wiel Nygaards legat (1961)

== Other sources ==
- Hjeltnes, Guri (1995). "Øverland, Arnulf". In Dahl, Hans Fredrik (ed.). Norsk krigsleksikon 1940-45. Oslo: Cappelen. Archived from the original on 2011-07-24.
- Hambro, Carl (1984) Arnulf Øverland : det brennende hjerte (Oslo: Aschehoug) ISBN 8203112366
