= Knut Wigert =

Norwegian actor (1916–2006)

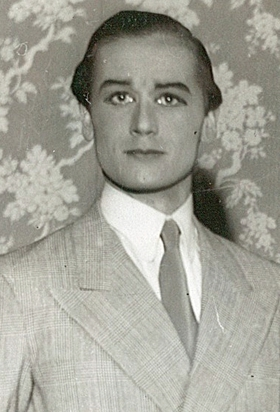
- Born: Knut Kirsebom; 3 October 1916; Skien, Norway
- Died: 14 June 2006 (aged 89); Oslo
- Occupation: Actor
- Spouse: Sofie Helene Wigert (second wife)
- Relatives: Sonja Wigert (sister); Arthur Nordlie (father-in-law)
- Awards: Fritt Ord Honorart Award (1996)

Knut Kirsebom Wigert (3 October 1916 – 14 June 2006) was a Norwegian actor, known for his many Ibsen roles and the establishment of an Ibsen museum in Oslo.

== Personal life ==
Knut Hansen was born in Skien as a son of Major Sigvald Hansen (1881–1954) and his wife Carmen Franciska Christina Kirsebom (1887–1951), and a younger brother of Sonja Wigert. He changed his last name to Wigert in 1935.

Wigert was married to Eva Nordlie from 1942 to 1946. In January 1950 he married ship-owner Sofie Helene Huitfeldt, née Olsen. The marriage lasted until her death in September 1989. They resided in Bærum. He was a son-in-law of ship-owner Rudolf Olsen, and the family inherited large properties including the Dirhue Manor in Tjøme Municipality. Wigert lost this to his step-children in an out-of-court settlement in 1993.

In 1991 he married for the third time, to journalist Vera Dietrichson Burkoff (1929–2007). In his later life he lived at Madserud in Oslo. He died in June 2006 in Oslo.

== Career ==
=== Actor ===
Wigert finished school when graduating Oslo Commerce School in 1936. He made his stage début at Centralteatret in 1937, and started acting for the National Theatre in Oslo from 1938. He played "the pilot" in an adaptation of Karel Čapek's anti-Nazi play Matka (The Mother), which had dress rehearsal on 8 April 1940 and never premièred due to the German invasion of Norway the following day. Among his roles were "Hugo" in a 1950 adaptation of Jean-Paul Sartre's Dirty Hands, and "Brick" in a 1956 adaptation of Tennessee Williams's Cat on a Hot Tin Roof. He played a long series of Ibsen characters, such as "Hertug Skule" (from The Pretenders), "Peer" (from Peer Gynt), "Rosmer" (from Rosmersholm), "Brack" (from Hedda Gabler), "Helmer" (from A Doll's House), "Rubek" (from When We Dead Awaken), "Solness" (from The Master Builder), "Borkman" (from John Gabriel Borkman) and "Julian" (from Emperor and Galilean). A bust of Wigert, sculptured by Joseph Grimeland, was unveiled at the National Theatre in 1998.

He made his film début in 1940, in the film Tante Pose, acted in the 1946 film Englandsfarere, and played the role "Fridtjof Nansen" in Bare et liv from 1968.

=== Second World War ===
During the Second World War, Wigert was a member of the Norwegian Independent Company 1, recruited by former actor and leader of the group Martin Linge. He participated in the Operation Archery raid at Måløy in 'December 1941, and later graduated as a lieutenant from the Royal Military College, Sandhurst in 1943. He published the book Landflyktig in 1945, describing his travel via Stockholm, Moscow, Istanbul, Cairo and South Africa to England, and later service in the army.

He was decorated with the Defence Medal 1940–1945, the Haakon VII 70th Anniversary Medal and the 1939–45 Star as well as the King's Medal of Merit in gold.

=== Organizing career ===
Wigert chaired the Riksmål Society from 1974 to 1983. He was also a supervisory council member of the National Theatre and board member of the companies Tinfos Papirfabrik and Olsen Daughter.

He was decorated as a Commander of the Royal Norwegian Order of St. Olav in 1988 for his contributions to Norwegian theatre. He received the city of Oslo's cultural prize in 1992 for his initiative and efforts which resulted in the establishment of a Henrik Ibsen museum in Oslo. He received the Fritt Ord Honorary Award in 1996.

== Filmography ==
Year	Title	Role	Notes
1940	Tante Pose	Paul Waage, stud. med.	
1940	Tørres Snørtevold	Løytnanten	
1946	Englandsfarere	Harald Silju	
1948	Trollfossen	Borg, ingeniør	
1955	The Summer Wind Blows	'Romeo' i radio extract	Voice
1968	Just a life – the story of Fridtjof Nansen	Fridtjof Nansen	
1974	Ransom	Polson	
1978	Autumn Sonata	Professor	Uncredited

Cultural offices
Preceded by Aksel Lydersen	Leader of the Riksmål Society; 1974–1983	Succeeded by Jan Willoch
