= Scott Hansen Islands =

Russian island group in the Kara Sea

Coordinates: 75°19′N 86°15′E

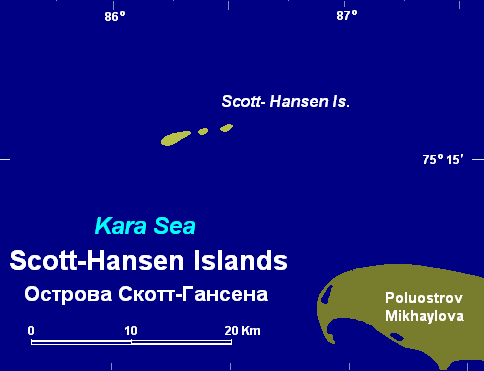

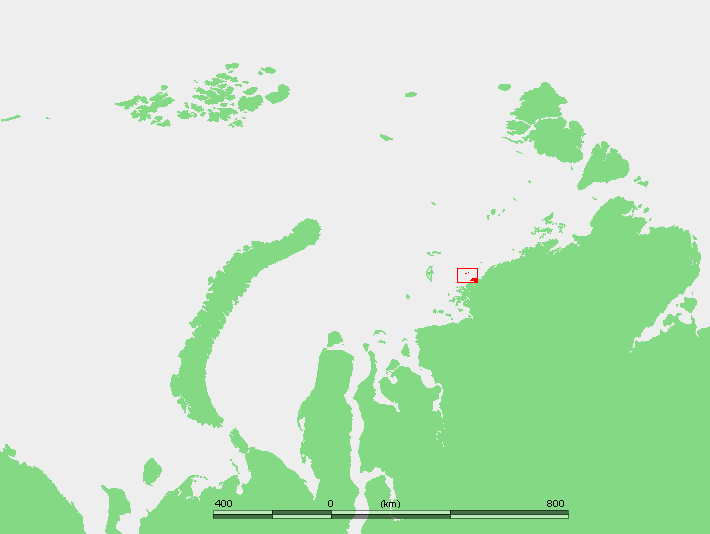
Location of the Scott Hansen Islands in the Kara Sea.

The Scott Hansen Islands (Russian: Острова Скотт-Гансена, Ostrova Skott-Gansena) is a group of three small islands covered with tundra vegetation in the Kara Sea, about 20 km from the tip of the Mikhailov Peninsula in the coast of Siberia. In many maps these islands appear with the name Scott-Gansen Islands, derived from the Russian spelling.

The Scott-Hansen group belongs to the Krasnoyarsk Krai administrative division of Russia. It is part of the Great Arctic State Nature Reserve, the largest nature reserve of Russia. The westernmost island, at about 3 km, is larger than the other two. The islands are named as a group; individual islands do not have names in common maps. The sea surrounding the islands is covered with pack ice with some polynias in winter, and there are many ice floes even in summer.

== Sigurd Scott-Hansen ==
Lieutenant Sigurd Scott Hansen

This archipelago is named after Sigurd Scott-Hansen (1868-1937), a Norwegian naval lieutenant, who was in charge of the astronomical and meteorological observations during Fridtjof Nansen's 1893 polar expedition on the Fram. Sigurd Scott-Hansen was born in Leith, Scotland where his father, Andreas Hansen, was the parish priest at the Norwegian Sailors' Church. Scott-Hansen grew up in Kristiania (now Oslo), Norway and made his career in the Royal Norwegian Navy. In 1889 he became 2nd lieutenant, in 1892 1st lieutenant, in 1898 captain and in 1910 he was appointed commander.

Between 1893 and 1896, he joined in The First Fram Expedition under the leadership of Fridtjof Nansen. He was in charge of the meteorological, astronomical and magnetic data.

Scott-Hansen retired from naval service in 1931, and later aided with the interior restoration of Fram. He died in 1939, the year after the Fram Museum opened at Bygdøynes in Oslo.

== See also ==
- Kara Sea
- Fridtjof Nansen
