= Alf Larsen =

Norwegian poet, essayist and magazine editor

- Born: 22 July 1885; Tjøme, Norway
- Died: 12 December 1967 (aged 82); Tjøme, Norway
- Occupations: Poet; Essayist; Magazine editor

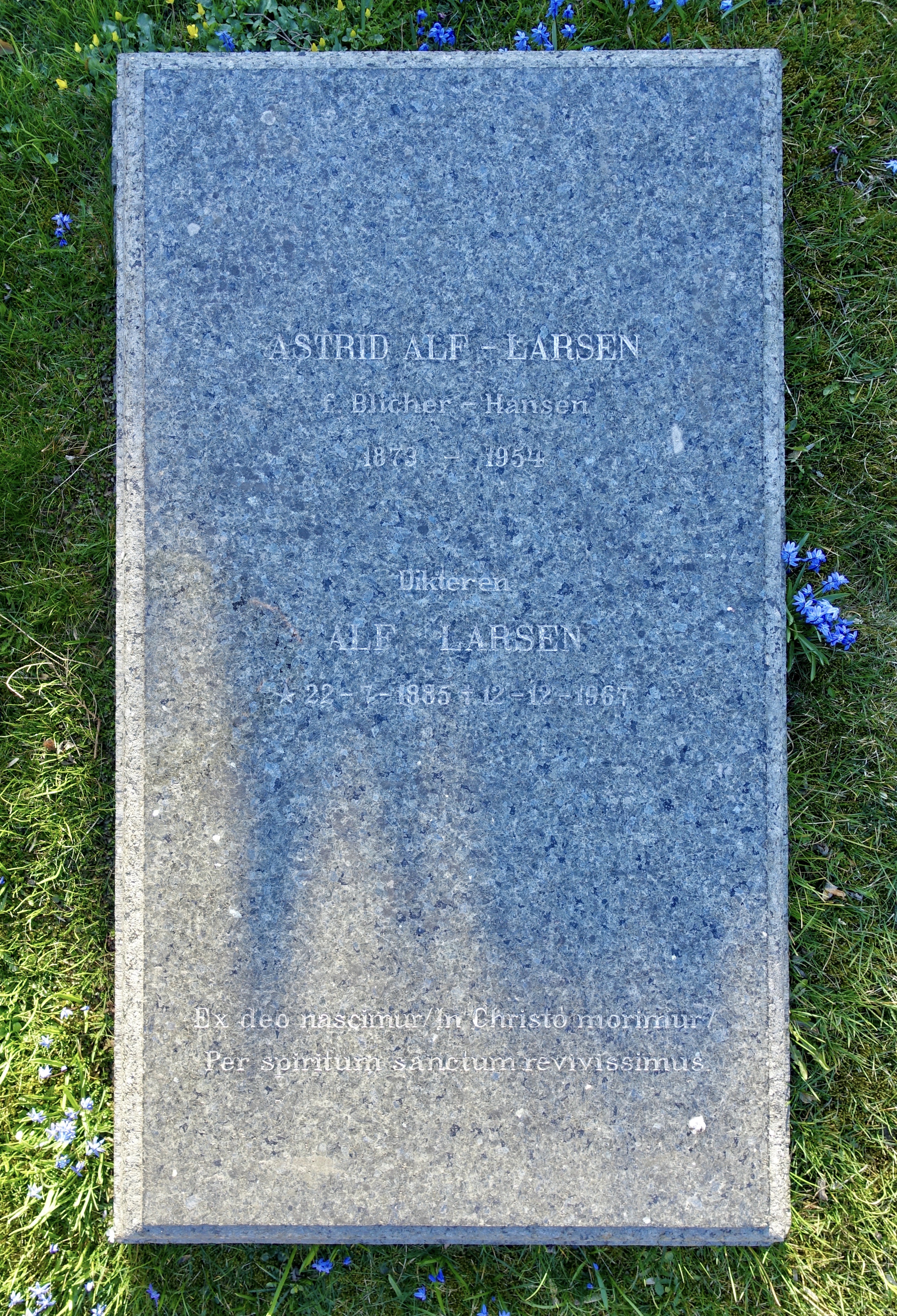
Gravestone of Norwegian writer Alf Larsen (1885–1967) in the churchyard outside Tjøme kirke, a Lutheran church on the island of Tjøme in Færder Municipality, Norway. A granite tombstone with a rosencrucian inscription in Latin: Ex Deo nascimur, In Christo morimur, Per Spiritum Sanctum reviviscimus ("From God we are born, In Christ we die, In the Holy Spirit we are reborn"). Photographed April 2020

Alf Larsen (22 July 1885 – 12 December 1967) was a Norwegian poet, essayist and magazine editor. He founded and edited the anthrophosophic magazine Janus from 1933 to 1941. His literary awards include the Gyldendal's Endowment (1959) and the Dobloug Prize (1961).

== Biography ==
Larsen was born at Tjøme Municipality in Vestfold, Norway. he was the eldest of seven children born to Alfred Larsen (1859-1905) and Kristine Iversen (1857-1936). His father was a skipper who died in the North Sea in 1905. Larsen was the benefactor of a wealthy man from Sandefjord who paid his schooling, first at Skiringssal (1902-1903), later at Grundtvigs folk school in Lyngby, Denmark. From January 1908 to 1909, he continued his studies at Sankt Andreas, a Jesuit school at Charlottenlund in Copenhagen.

He made his literary debut in 1912 with the poetry collection Vinterlandet. In 1921, he bought Rød Gård in Tjøme. He supported Rudolf Steiner's anthroposophy, and edited the magazine Janus from 1933 to 1941. He co-founded the publishing house Dreyers Forlag in 1942. He was awarded the Gyldendal's Endowment in 1959.

Larsen himself considered his magazine Janus to be his most valuable contribution to Norwegian cultural life. There he presented what in hindsight stands out as a surprisingly clear-sighted criticism of Nazi Germany. He also drew attention to the pre-nazistoid tendencies in the work of Norway's great writer, Knut Hamsun. Further he radically criticized other totalitarian ideologies of the time including Stalinism and Fascism, underscoring that they undermined the individuality and responsibility of man, as man is primarily to be understood as a spiritual being. And though Larsen considered himself a Christian, he strongly rejected the then widespread message of the Oxford Group, most notably represented by the evangelist Frank Buchman, claiming that they represented a materialistic mentality.

In Janus Larsen also presented the work of many international writers to the Norwegian public, both in the form of reviews and first-time translations. Further, Janus was Larsen's main channel for advocating the ideas of Rudolf Steiner, both with regards to education and art, and as a general philosophy of life. This movement has later continued in the cultural magazines Spektrum, Horisont and Arken, and by such prolific writers as André Bjerke, Jens Bjørneboe and Kaj Skagen.

== Personal life ==
In 1922, Larsen married Astrid Blicher-Hansen (1873–1954). Alf Larsen died during 1967 and was buried in the churchyard at Tjøme Church. In the center of Tjøme is the Alf-Larsen monument by sculptor Finn Henrik Bodvin (1928 2002). It was unveiled on 21 July 1985 on the occasion of his 100th birthday.

== Subsequent evaluations ==
In 2009 Larsen was declared to be an antisemite by historian Jan Erik Ebbestad Hansen, who in archives found a pamphlet named Jødeproblemet ("The Jew Problem"). Historian Hans Fredrik Dahl referred to Larsen as "the worst Jew-hater of Norwegian twentieth-century literature".

However, Larsen's post-war openly expressed antipathy towards the Jews may not represent the complete truth on this sensitive matter, as one of his favourite authors is known to have been the Jewish-born Catholic philosopher Max Picard. Larsen had also several times rejected the racial theories of the Nazis in Janus. (see JANUS - et tidsskrift og en tid, by Terje Gerotti Simonsen). It seems, that Larsen's views after World War II for some reason - some say because the absence of his late wife's mellowing influence—happened to become increasingly cliche-filled and eventually right out antisemitic.

== Awards ==
- Gyldendal's Endowment – 1959
- Dobloug Prize – 1961
