= Nansen's Fram expedition =

1893–1896 attempt by Fridtjof Nansen to reach the North Pole

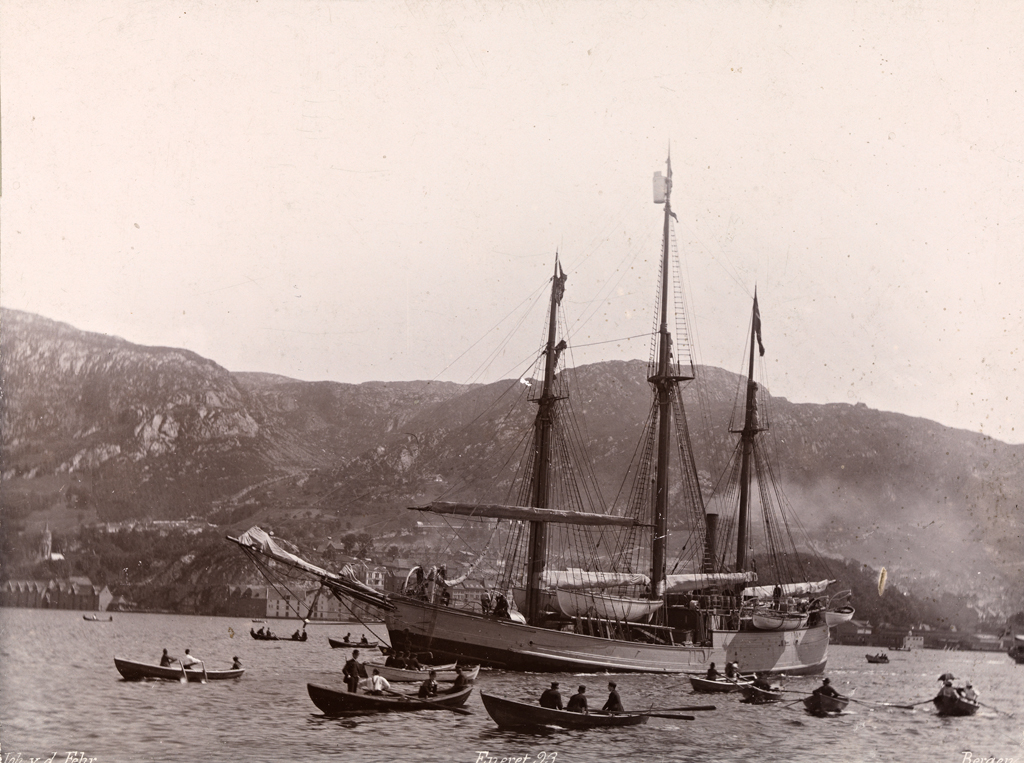
Fram leaves Bergen on 2 July 1893, bound for the Arctic Ocean

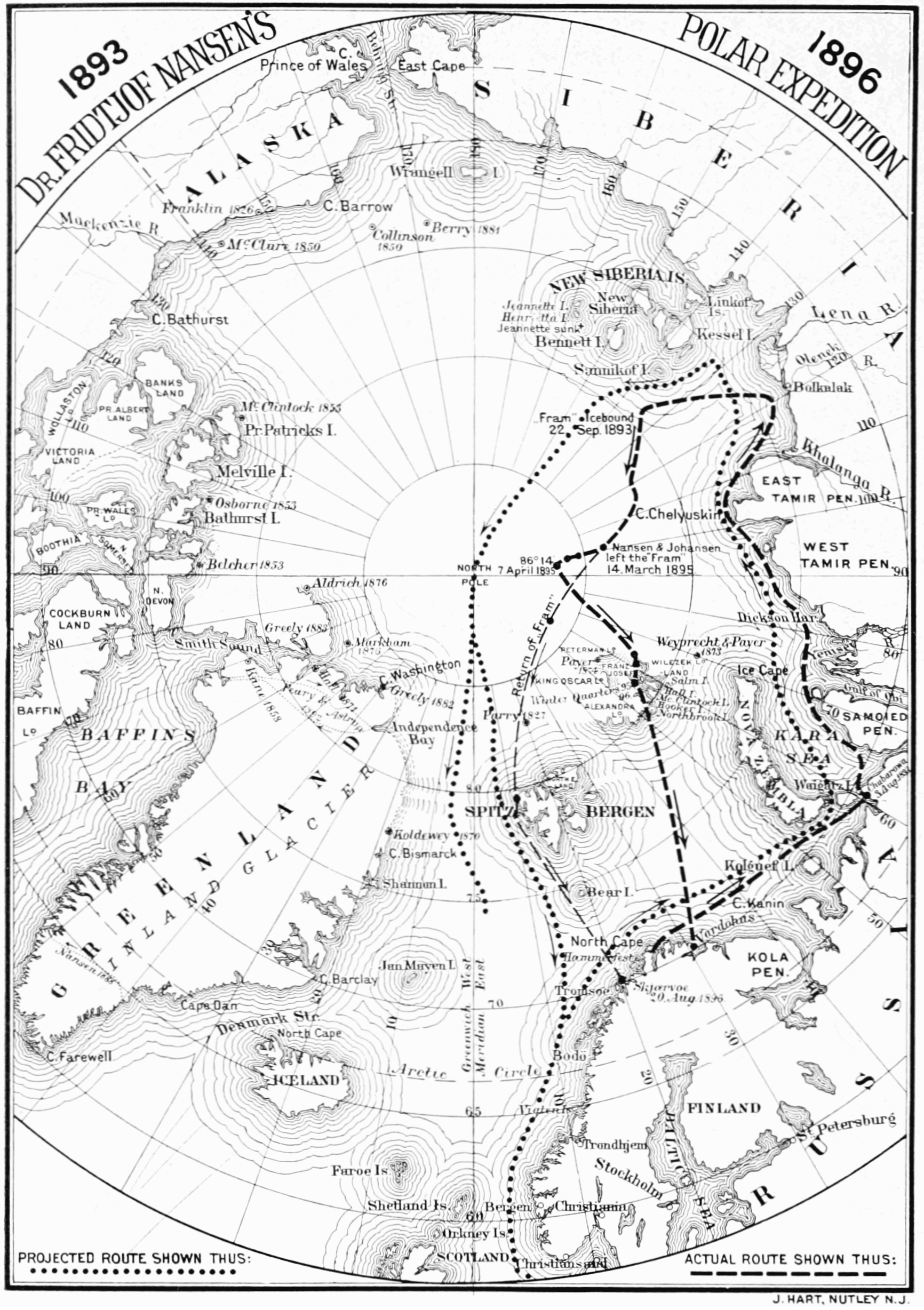
Period map showing the regions traversed by the expedition

Nansen's Fram expedition of 1893–1896 was an attempt by the Norwegian explorer Fridtjof Nansen to reach the geographical North Pole by harnessing the natural east–west current of the Arctic Ocean. In the face of much discouragement from other polar explorers, Nansen took his ship Fram to the New Siberian Islands in the eastern Arctic Ocean, froze her into the pack ice, and waited for the drift to carry her towards the pole. Impatient with the slow speed and erratic character of the drift, after 18 months Nansen and a chosen companion, Hjalmar Johansen, left the ship with a team of Samoyed dogs and sledges and made for the pole. They did not reach it, but they achieved a record Farthest North latitude of 86°13.6′N before a long retreat over ice and water to reach safety in Franz Josef Land. Meanwhile, Fram continued to drift westward, finally emerging in the North Atlantic Ocean.

The idea for the expedition had arisen after items from the American vessel Jeannette, which had sunk off the north coast of Siberia in 1881, were discovered three years later off the south-west coast of Greenland. The wreckage had obviously been carried across the polar ocean, perhaps across the pole itself. Based on this and other debris recovered from the Greenland coast, the meteorologist Henrik Mohn developed a theory of transpolar drift, which led Nansen to believe that a specially designed ship could be frozen in the pack ice and follow the same track as Jeannette wreckage, thus reaching the vicinity of the pole.

Nansen supervised the construction of a vessel with a rounded hull and other features designed to withstand prolonged pressure from ice. The ship was rarely threatened during her long imprisonment, and emerged unscathed after three years. The scientific observations carried out during this period contributed significantly to the new discipline of oceanography, which subsequently became the main focus of Nansen's scientific work. Fram's drift and Nansen's sledge journey proved conclusively that there were no significant land masses between the Eurasian continents and the North Pole, and confirmed the general character of the north polar region as a deep, ice-covered sea. Although Nansen retired from exploration after this expedition, the methods of travel and survival he developed with Johansen influenced all the polar expeditions, north and south, which followed in the subsequent three decades.

== Background ==
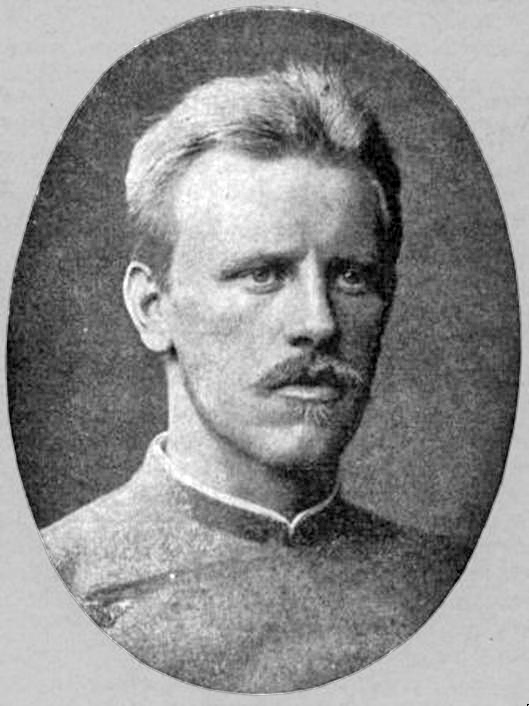
Fridtjof Nansen at the time of his Greenland crossing

In September 1879, Jeannette, an ex-Royal Navy gunboat converted by the US Navy for Arctic exploration, and commanded by George W. De Long, entered the pack ice north of the Bering Strait. She remained ice-bound for nearly two years, drifting to the area of the New Siberian Islands, before being crushed and sunk on 13 June 1881. Her crew escaped in boats and made for the Siberian coast; most, including De Long, subsequently perished either during the boat journey or in the wastelands of the Lena River delta. Three years later, relics from Jeannette appeared on the opposite side of the world, in the vicinity of Julianehaab on the southwest coast of Greenland. These items, frozen into the drifting ice, included clothing bearing crew members' names and documents signed by De Long; they were indisputably genuine.

In a lecture given in 1884 to the Norwegian Academy of Science and Letters Dr. Henrik Mohn, one of the founders of modern meteorology, argued that the finding of the Jeannette relics indicated the existence of an ocean current flowing from east to west across the entire Arctic Ocean. The Danish governor of Julianehaab, writing of the find, surmised that an expedition frozen into the Siberian sea might, if its ship were to prove strong enough, cross the polar ocean and land in South Greenland. These theories were read with interest by the 23-year-old Fridtjof Nansen, then working as a curator at the Bergen Museum while completing his doctoral studies. Nansen was already captivated by the frozen north; two years earlier he had experienced a four-month voyage on the sealer Viking, which had included three weeks trapped in drifting ice. An expert skier, Nansen was making plans to lead the first crossing of the Greenland icecap, an objective delayed by the demands of his academic studies, but triumphantly achieved in 1888–89. Through these years Nansen remembered the east–west Arctic drift theory and its inherent possibilities for further polar exploration, and shortly after his return from Greenland he was ready to announce his plans.

== Preparations ==
=== Plan ===
The Arctic Ocean, showing a theoretical course of a drift from the New Siberian Islands to the Atlantic Ocean

In February 1890 Nansen addressed a meeting of the Norwegian Geographical Society in Oslo (then called Christiania). After drawing attention to the failures of the many expeditions which had approached the North Pole from the west, he considered the implications of the discovery of the Jeannette items, along with further finds of driftwood and other debris from Siberia or Alaska that had been identified along the Greenland coast. "Putting all this together," Nansen said, "we are driven to the conclusion that a current flows ... from the Siberian Arctic Sea to the east coast of Greenland," probably passing across the Pole. It seemed that the obvious thing to do was "to make our way into the current on that side of the Pole where it flows northward, and by its help to penetrate into those regions which all who have hitherto worked against [the current] have sought in vain to reach."

Nansen's plan required a small, strong and manoeuvrable ship, powered by sail and an engine, capable of carrying fuel and provisions for twelve men for five years. The vessel would follow Jeannette's route to the New Siberian Islands, and in the approximate position of Jeannette's sinking, when ice conditions were right "we shall plough our way in amongst the ice as far as we can." The ship would then drift with the ice towards the pole and eventually reach the sea between Greenland and Spitsbergen. Should the ship founder, a possibility which Nansen thought very unlikely, the party would camp on a floe and allow itself to be carried towards safety. Nansen observed: "If the Jeannette Expedition had had sufficient provisions, and had remained on the ice-floe on which the relics were found, the result would doubtless have been very different from what it was."

When Nansen's plans became public knowledge The New York Times was enthusiastic, deeming it "highly probable that there is a comparatively short and direct route across the Arctic Ocean by way of the North Pole, and that nature herself has supplied a means of communication across it." However, most experienced polar hands were dismissive. The American explorer Adolphus Greely called it "an illogical scheme of self-destruction"; his assistant, Lieutenant David Brainerd, called it "one of the most ill-advised schemes ever embarked on", and predicted that it would end in disaster. Sir Allen Young, a veteran of the searches for Sir John Franklin's lost expedition, did not believe that a ship could be built to withstand the crushing pressure of the ice: "If there is no swell the ice must go through her, whatever material she is made of." Sir Joseph Hooker, who had sailed south with James Clark Ross in 1839–43, was of the same opinion, and thought the risks were not worth taking. However, the equally experienced Sir Leopold McClintock called Nansen's project "the most adventurous programme ever brought under the notice of the Royal Geographical Society". The Swedish philanthropist Oscar Dickson, who had financed Baron Nordenskiöld's conquest of the North-East Passage in 1878–79, was sufficiently impressed to offer to meet Nansen's costs. With Norwegian nationalism on the rise, however, this gesture from their union partner Sweden provoked hostility in the Norwegian press; Nansen decided to rely solely on Norwegian support, and declined Dickson's proposal.

=== Finance ===
Nansen's original estimate for the total cost of the expedition was 300,000 kr. After giving a passionate speech before the Parliament of Norway (Storting), (Note: Nansen's speech ended with a peroration: "May Norwegians show the way! May it be the Norwegian flag that first flies over our Pole!) Nansen was awarded a grant of NOK 200,000; the balance was raised from private contributions which included 20,000 kroner from King Oscar II of Norway and Sweden. The Royal Geographical Society in London gave £300 (about NOK 6,000). Unfortunately, Nansen had underestimated the financing required—the ship alone would cost more than the total at his disposal. A renewed plea to the Storting produced a further NOK 80,000, and a national appeal raised the grand total to NOK 445,000. According to Nansen's own account, he made up the remaining deficiency from his own resources. His biographer Roland Huntford records that the final deficit of NOK 12,000 was cleared by two wealthy supporters, Axel Heiberg and an English expatriate, Charles Dick.

=== Ship ===
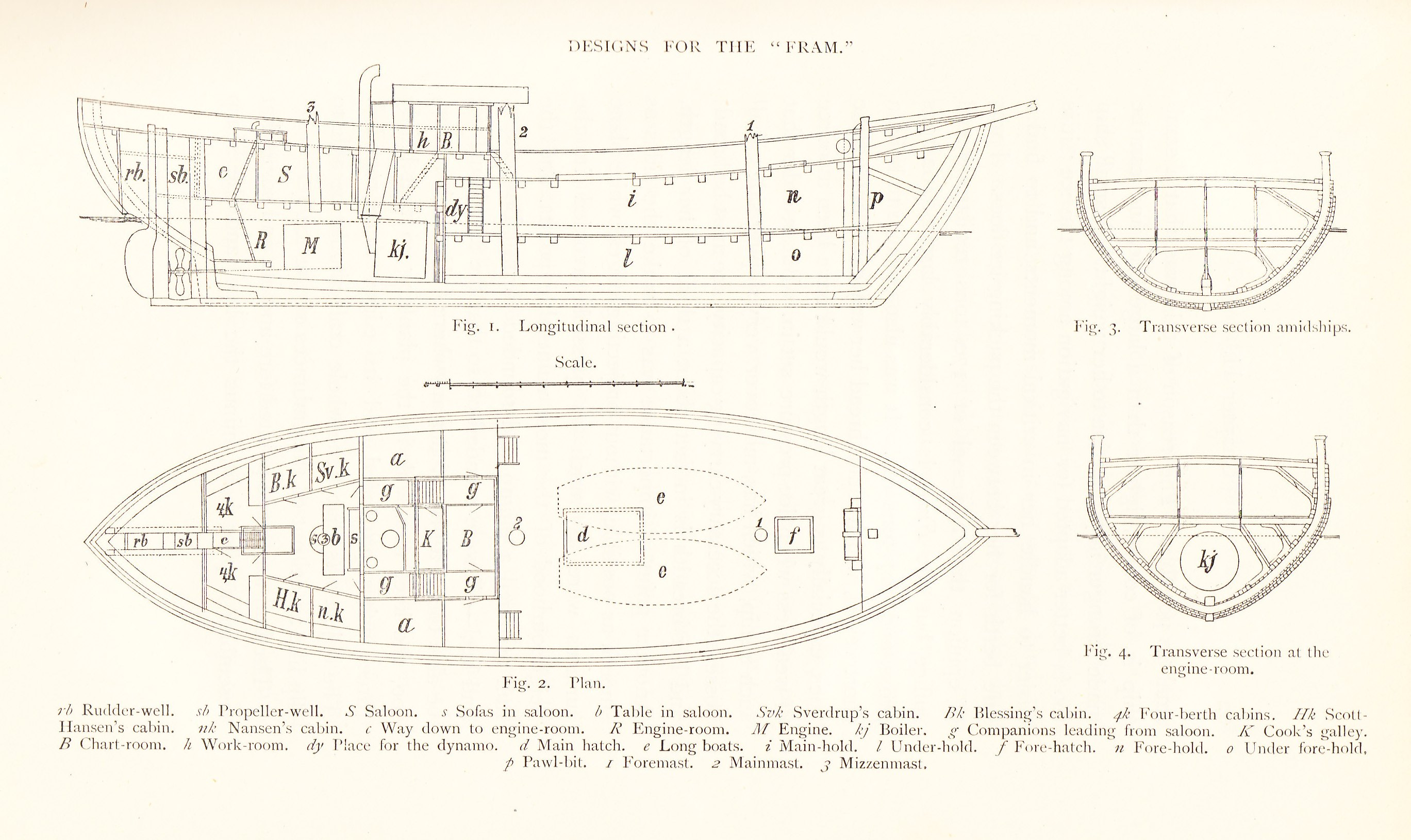
Section and Plan drawings for Fram, as agreed between Nansen and shipbuilder Colin Archer

To design and build his ship Nansen chose Colin Archer, Norway's leading shipbuilder and naval architect. Archer was well known for a particular hull design that combined seaworthiness with a shallow draught, and had pioneered the design of "double-ended" craft in which the conventional stern was replaced by a point, increasing manoeuvrability. Nansen records that Archer made "plan after plan of the projected ship; one model after another was prepared and abandoned". Finally, agreement was reached on a design, and on 9 June 1891 the two men signed the contract.

Nansen wanted the ship in one year; he was eager to get away before anyone else could adopt his ideas and forestall him. The ship's most significant external feature was the roundness of the hull, designed so that there was nothing upon which the ice could get a grip. Bow, stern and keel were rounded off, and the sides smoothed so that, in Nansen's words, the vessel would "slip like an eel out of the embraces of the ice". To give exceptional strength the hull was sheathed in South American greenheart, the hardest timber available. The three layers of wood forming the hull provided a combined thickness of between 24 and 28 inches (61 and 71 centimetres), increasing to around 48 inches (1.2 metres) at the bow, which was further protected by a protruding iron stem. Added strength was provided by crossbeams and braces throughout the length of the hull.

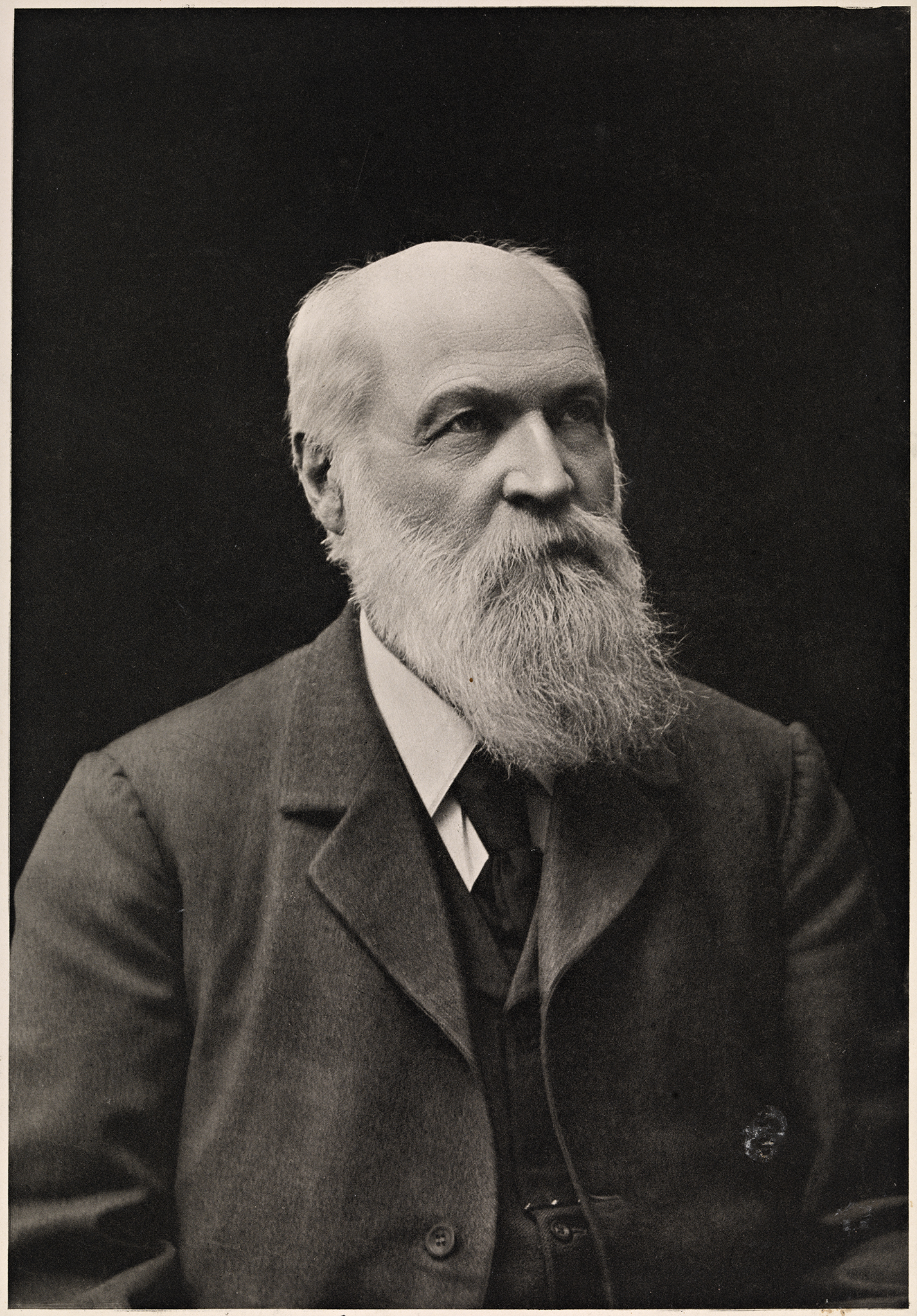
Colin Archer, designer and builder of Fram

The ship was rigged as a three-masted schooner, with a total sail area of 6,000 square feet (560 m^{2}). Its auxiliary engine of 220 horse-power was capable of speeds up to 7 knots (13 km/h; 8.1 mph). However, speed and sailing qualities were secondary to the requirement of providing a safe and warm stronghold for Nansen and his crew during a drift that might extend for several years, so particular attention was paid to the insulation of the living quarters. At around 400 gross register tonnage, the ship was considerably larger than Nansen had first anticipated, (Note: Nansen's original opinion had been that 170 gross register tonnage would be sufficient.) with an overall length of 128 feet (39 m) and a breadth of 36 feet (11 m), a ratio of just over three to one, giving her an unusually stubby appearance. (Note: By way of comparison, Scott's ship Discovery, the next ship purpose-built for polar exploration after Fram, had a length-to-beam ratio of more than five to one.) This odd shape was explained by Archer: "A ship that is built with exclusive regard to its suitability for [Nansen's] object must differ essentially from any known vessel." On 6 October 1892, at Archer's yard at Larvik, the ship was launched by Nansen's wife Eva after a brief ceremony. The ship was named Fram, meaning "Forward".

=== Crew ===
For his Greenland expedition of 1888–89 Nansen had departed from the traditional dependence on large-scale personnel, ships and backup, relying instead on a small well-trained group. Using the same principle for the Fram voyage, Nansen chose a party of just twelve from the thousands of applications that poured in from all over the world. One applicant was the 20-year-old Roald Amundsen, future conqueror of the South Pole, whose mother stopped him from going. The English explorer Frederick Jackson applied, but Nansen wanted only Norwegians, so Jackson organised his own expedition to Franz Josef Land.

To captain the ship and act as the expedition's second-in-command Nansen chose Otto Sverdrup, an experienced sailor who had taken part in the Greenland crossing. Theodore Jacobsen, who had experience in the Arctic as skipper of a sloop, signed on as Fram's mate, and a young naval lieutenant, Sigurd Scott Hansen, took charge of meteorological and magnetic observations. The ship's doctor, and the expedition's botanist, was Henrik Blessing, who graduated in medicine just before Fram's sailing date. Hjalmar Johansen, an army reserve lieutenant and dog-driving expert, was so determined to join the expedition that he agreed to sign on as stoker, the only position by then available. Likewise Adolf Juell, with 20 years' experience at sea as mate and captain, took the post of cook on the Fram voyage. Ivar Mogstad was an official at Gaustad psychiatric hospital, but his technical abilities as a handyman and mechanic impressed Nansen. The oldest man in the party, at 40, was the chief engineer, Anton Amundsen (no relation of Roald). The second engineer, Lars Pettersen, kept his Swedish nationality from Nansen, and although it was soon discovered by his shipmates, he was allowed to remain with the expedition, the only non-Norwegian in the party. The remaining crew members were Peter Henriksen, Bernhard Nordahl and Bernt Bentzen, the last-named joining the expedition in Tromsø at very short notice.

== Voyage ==
Routes taken during the 1893–1896 Fram expedition: Fram's route eastward from Vardø along the Siberian coast, turning north at the New Siberian Islands to enter the pack ice, July–September 1893 Fram's drift in the ice from the New Siberian Islands north and west to Spitsbergen, September 1893 – August 1896 Nansen and Johansen's march to Farthest North, 86°13.6′N, and subsequent retreat to Cape Flora in Franz Josef Land, March 1895 – June 1896 Nansen and Johansen's return to Vardø from Cape Flora, August 1896 Fram's voyage from Spitsbergen to Tromsø, August 1896

=== Journey to the ice ===
Fram's masthead pennant during the voyage

Before the start of the voyage Nansen decided to deviate from his original plan: instead of following Jeannette's route to the New Siberian Islands by way of the Bering Strait, he would make a shorter journey, taking Nordenskiöld's North-East Passage along the northern coast of Siberia. (Note: Nansen gave no explanation of this decision, beyond stating that the shorter route was safer and would enable an earlier start to the drift.) Fram left Christiania on 24 June 1893, seen on her way by a cannon salute from the fort and the cheers of thousands of well-wishers. This was the first of a series of farewells as Fram sailed round the coast and moved northward, reaching Bergen on 1 July (where there was a great banquet in Nansen's honour), Trondheim on 5 July and Tromsø, north of the Arctic Circle, a week later. The last Norwegian port of call was Vardø, where Fram arrived on 18 July. After the final provisions were taken on board, Nansen, Sverdrup, Hansen and Blessing spent their last hours ashore in a sauna, being beaten with birch twigs by two young girls.

The first leg of the journey eastward took Fram across the Barents Sea towards Novaya Zemlya and then to the North Russian settlement of Khabarova where the first batch of dogs was brought on board. On 3 August Fram weighed anchor and moved cautiously eastward, entering the Kara Sea the next day. Few ships had sailed the Kara Sea before, and charts were incomplete. On 18 August, in the area of the Yenisei River delta, an uncharted island was discovered and named Sverdrup Island after Fram's commander. Fram was now moving towards the Taimyr Peninsula and Cape Chelyuskin, the most northerly point of the Eurasian continental mass. Heavy ice slowed the expedition's progress, and at the end of August it was held up for four days while the ship's boiler was repaired and cleaned. The crew also experienced the dead water phenomenon, where a ship's forward progress is impeded by energy dissipation caused by a layer of fresh water lying on top of heavier salt water. On 9 September a wide stretch of ice-free water opened up, and next day Fram rounded Cape Chelyuskin—the second ship to do so, after Nordenskiöld's Vega in 1878—and entered the Laptev Sea.

After being prevented by ice from reaching the mouth of the Olenyok River, where a second batch of dogs was waiting to be picked up, Fram moved north and east towards the New Siberian Islands. Nansen's hope was to find open water to 80° north latitude and then enter the pack; however, on 20 September ice was sighted just south of 78°. Fram followed the line of the ice before stopping in a small bay beyond the 78° mark. On 28 September it became evident that the ice would not break up, and the dogs were moved from the ship to kennels on the ice. On 5 October the rudder was raised to a position of safety and the ship, in Scott Hansen's words, was "well and truly moored for the winter". The position was 78°49′N, 132°53′E.

=== Drift (first phase) ===
On 9 October Fram had her first experience of ice pressure. Archer's design was quickly vindicated as the ship rose and fell, the ice being unable to grip the hull. Otherwise the first weeks in the ice were disappointing, as the unpredictable drift moved Fram in gyratory fashion, sometimes north, sometimes south; by 19 November, after six weeks, Fram was south of the latitude at which she had entered the ice.

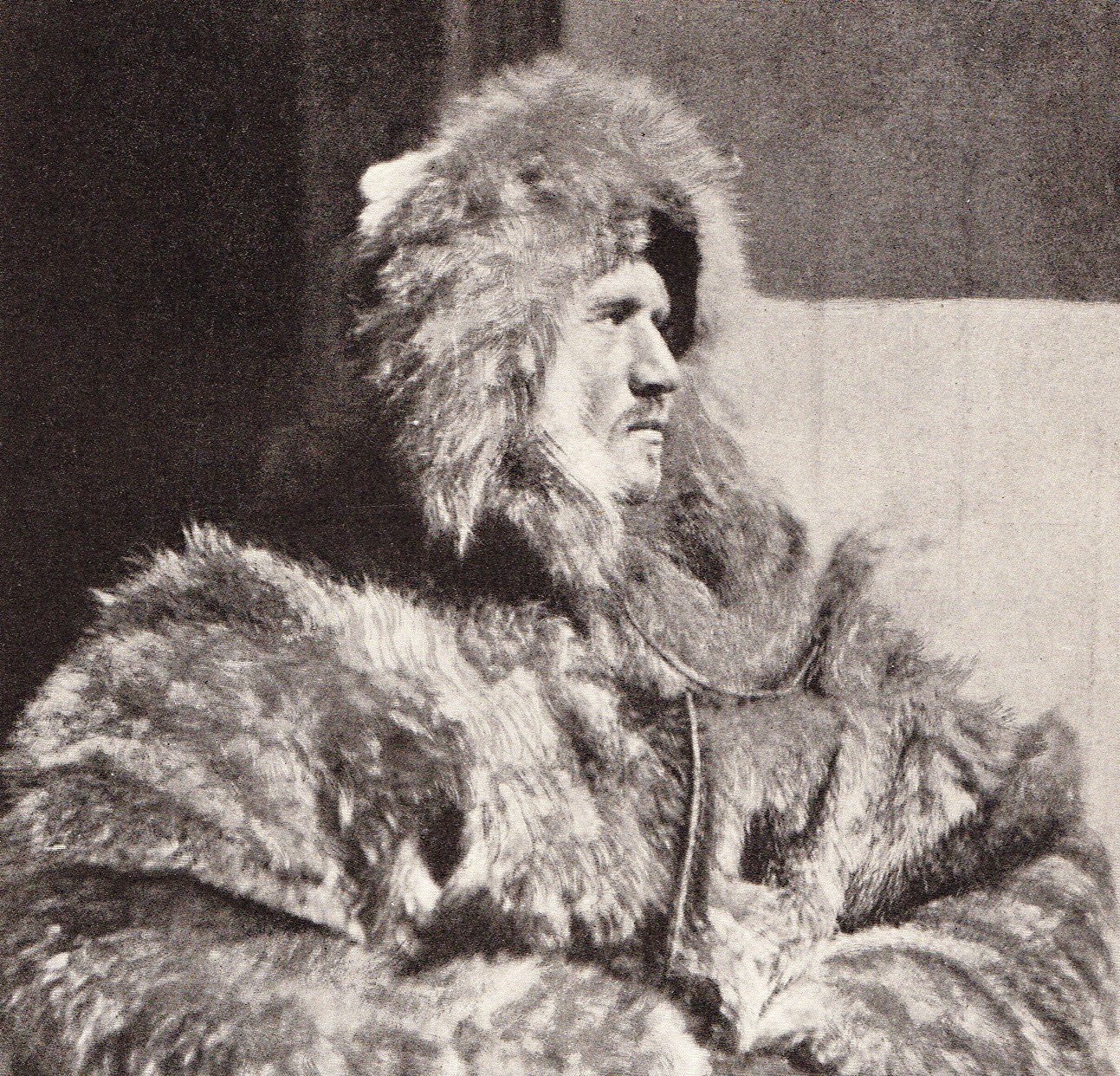
Hjalmar Johansen, Fram's stoker and dog-driving expert, Nansen's chosen companion for the North Pole dash

After the sun disappeared on 25 October the ship was lit by electric lamps from a wind-powered generator. The crew settled down to a comfortable routine in which boredom and inactivity were the main enemies. Men began to irritate each other, and fights sometimes broke out. Nansen attempted to start a newspaper, but the project soon fizzled out through lack of interest. Small tasks were undertaken and scientific observations maintained, but there was no urgency. Nansen expressed his frustration in his journal: "I feel I must break through this deadness, this inertia, and find some outlet for my energies." And later: "Can't something happen? Could not a hurricane come and tear up this ice?" Only after the turn of the year, in January 1894, did the northerly direction become generally settled. The 80° mark was finally passed on 22 March.

Based on the uncertain direction and slow speed of the drift, Nansen calculated that it might take the ship five years to reach the pole. In January 1894 he had first discussed with both Henriksen and Johansen the possibility of making a sledge journey with the dogs, from Fram to the pole, though they made no immediate plans. Nansen's first attempts to master dog-driving were an embarrassing failure, but he persevered and gradually achieved better results. He also discovered that the normal cross-country skiing speed was the same as that of dogs pulling loaded sledges. Men could travel under their own power, skiing, rather than riding on the sledge, and loads could be correspondingly increased. This, according to biographer and historian Roland Huntford, amounted to a revolution in polar travel methods.

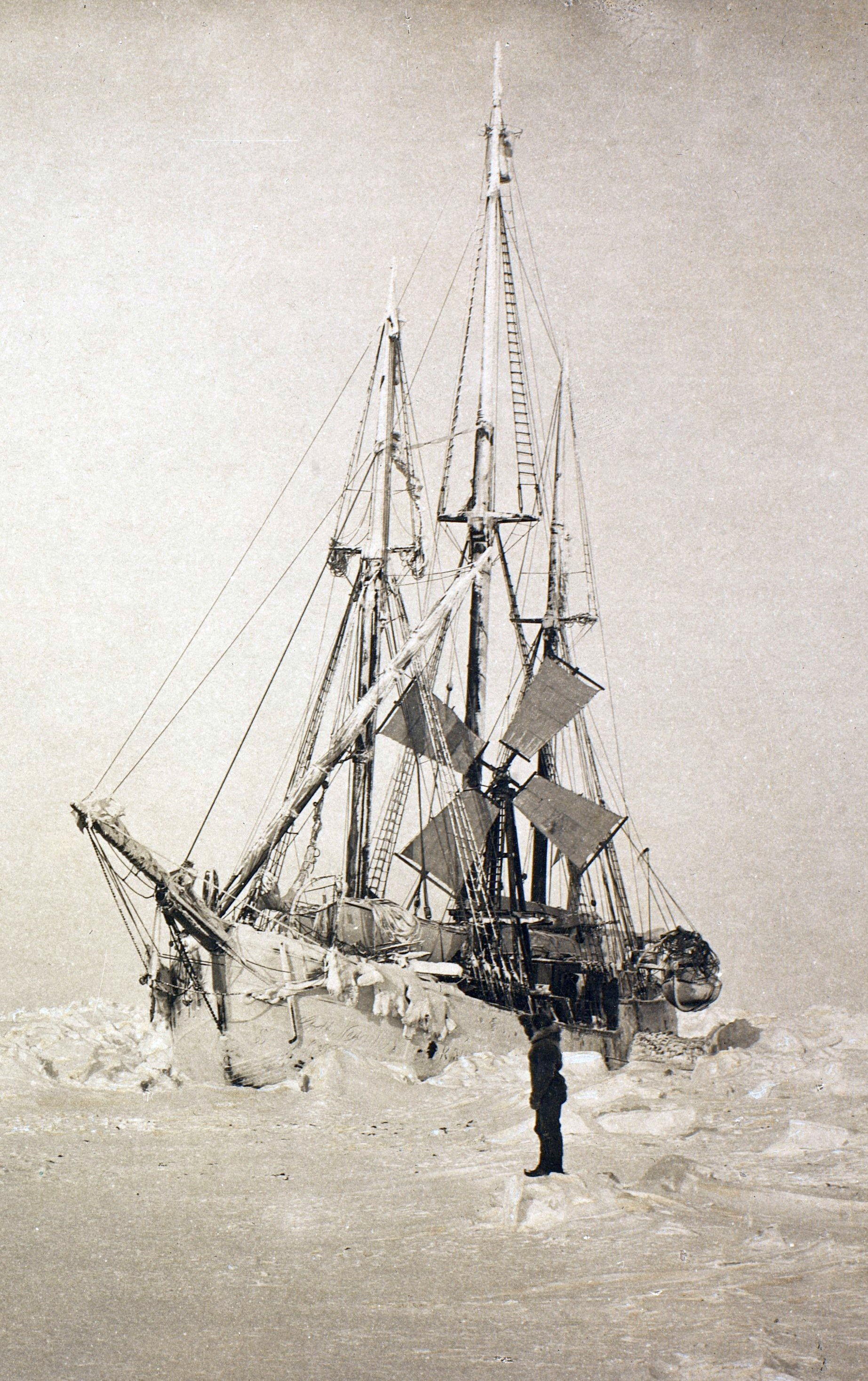
Fram, held in the ice, March 1894

On 19 May, two days after the celebrations for Norway's National Day, Fram passed 81°, indicating that the ship's northerly speed was slowly increasing, though it was still barely a mile (1.6 km) a day. With a growing conviction that a sledge journey might be necessary to reach the pole, in September Nansen decreed that everyone would practice skiing for two hours a day. On 16 November he revealed his intention to the crew: he and one companion would leave the ship and start for the pole when the 83° mark was passed. After reaching the pole the pair would make for Franz Josef Land, and then cross to Spitsbergen where they hoped to find a ship to take them home. Three days later Nansen asked Hjalmar Johansen, the most experienced dog-driver among the crew, to join him on the polar journey.

The crew spent the following months preparing for the forthcoming dash for the pole. On the Inuit model, they built qamutit that would facilitate fast travel over rough sea ice terrain and constructed kayaks for use during the expected water crossings. There were endless trials of special clothing and other gear. Violent and prolonged tremors began to shake the ship on 3 January 1895, and two days later the crew disembarked, expecting the ship to be crushed. Instead the pressure lessened, and the crew went back on board and resumed preparations for Nansen's journey. After the excitement it was noted that Fram had drifted beyond Greely's Farthest North record of 83°24, and on 8 January was at 83°34′N.

=== March for the Pole ===
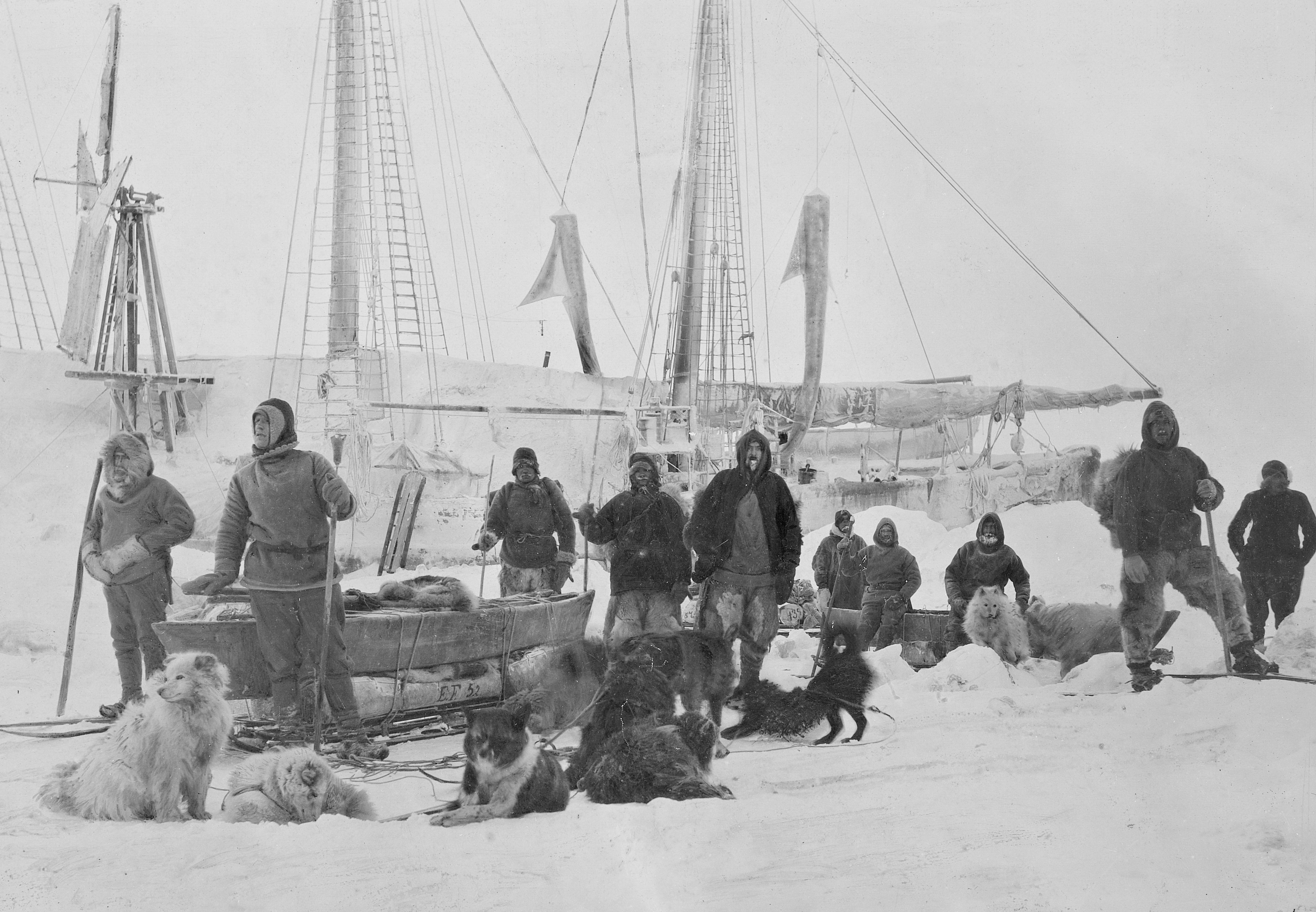
Nansen and Johansen finally depart on their polar journey, 14 March 1895. Nansen is the tall figure, second from left; Johansen is standing second from right.

On 17 February 1895 Nansen began a farewell letter to his wife, Eva, writing that should he come to grief "you will know that your image will be the last I see." He was also reading everything he could about Franz Josef Land, his intended destination after the pole. The archipelago had been discovered in 1873 by Julius Payer, and was incompletely mapped. (Note: Payer's 1874 map and Leigh Smith's 1881 map were all that was available to Nansen at the start of his journey.) It was, however, apparently the home of countless bears and seals, and Nansen saw it as an excellent food source on his return journey to civilization.

On 14 March, with the ship at 84°4′N, the pair finally began their polar march. This was their third attempt to leave the ship; on 26 February and again on the 28th, damage to sledges had forced them to return after travelling short distances. After these mishaps Nansen thoroughly overhauled his equipment, minimised the travelling stores, recalculated weights and reduced the convoy to three sledges, before giving the order to start again. A supporting party accompanied the pair and shared the first night's camp. The next day, Nansen and Johansen skied on alone.

The pair initially traveled mainly over flat snowfields. Nansen had allowed 50 days to cover the 356 nautical miles (660 km; 410 mi) to the pole, requiring an average daily journey of seven nautical miles (13 km; 8.1 mi). On 22 March a sextant observation showed that the pair had travelled 65 nautical miles (120 km; 75 mi) towards the pole at a daily average of over nine nautical miles (17 km; 10 mi). This had been achieved despite very low temperatures, typically around −40 °F (−40 °C), and small scale mishaps including the loss of the sledgemeter that recorded mileage. However, as the surfaces became uneven and made skiing more difficult, their speeds slowed. A sextant reading on 29 March of 85°56′N indicated that a week's travel had brought them 47 nautical miles (87 km; 54 mi) nearer to the pole, but also showed that their average daily distances were falling. More worryingly, a theodolite reading that day suggested that they were at only 85°15′N, and they had no means of knowing which of the readings was correct. They realised that they were fighting a southerly drift, and that distances travelled did not necessarily equate to northerly progression. Johansen's diary indicated his failing spirits: "My fingers are all destroyed. All mittens are frozen stiff ... It is becoming worse and worse ... God knows what will happen to us".

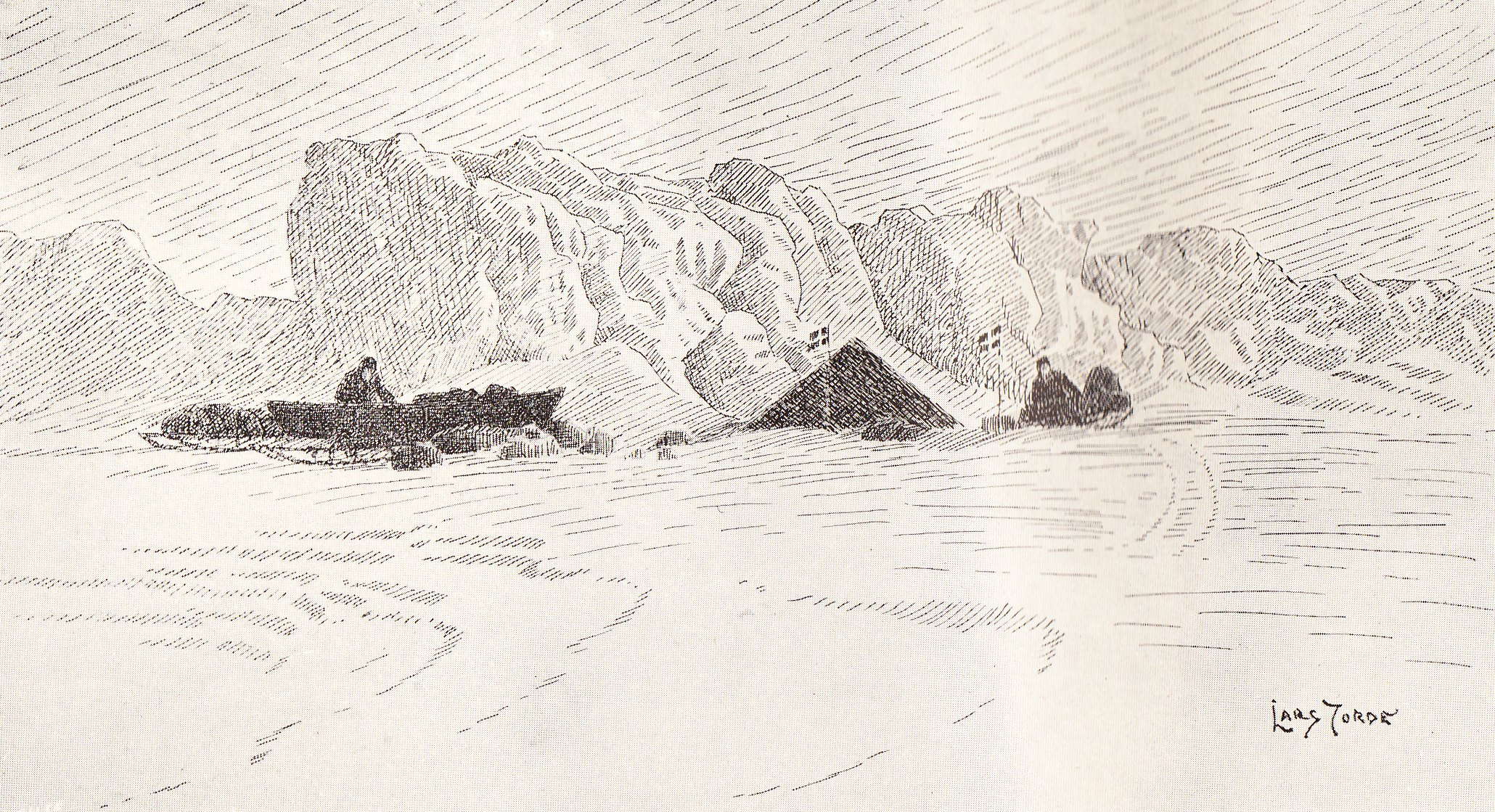
Artist's impression of Nansen and Johansen's northernmost camp, 86°13.6′N on 7 April 1895

On 3 April, after days of difficult travel, Nansen privately began to wonder if the pole might, after all, be out of reach. Unless the surface improved, their food would not last them to the pole and then on to Franz Josef Land. The next day they calculated their position at a disappointing 86°3'; Nansen confided in his diary that: "I have become more and more convinced we ought to turn before time." After making camp on 7 April Nansen scouted ahead on snowshoes looking for a path forward, but saw only "a veritable chaos of iceblocks stretching as far as the horizon". He decided that they would go no further north, and would head for Cape Fligely in Franz Josef Land. Nansen recorded the latitude of their final northerly camp as 86°13.6′N, almost three degrees (169.6 nautical miles or 314.1 kilometres) beyond Greely's previous Farthest North mark.

=== Retreat to Franz Josef Land ===
The change of direction to south-west provided much better travelling conditions, probably because the course to Franz Josef Land was broadly parallel to the lines of disturbance in the ice instead of perpendicular to them. Progress was swift: "If this goes on," Nansen recorded on 13 April, "the return journey will be quicker than I thought." However, the same diary entry records a mishap that day: both men's watches had stopped. Although Nansen's journal comment is mild, the incident was potentially disastrous. Without the correct time they could not calculate their longitude and thus maintain the correct course to Franz Josef Land. They restarted the watches based on Nansen's guesswork that their longitude was 86°E, but the pair were no longer certain where they were. If they were farther west than Nansen's assumption, they might miss Franz Josef Land altogether, and head for the open Atlantic.

The direction of the drift became northerly, hampering the pair's progress. By 18 April, after 11 days' travel from Farthest North, they had only made 40 nautical miles (74 km; 46 mi) to the south. They now travelled over much more broken terrain with wide open leads of water. On about 20 April they were cheered by the sight of a large piece of driftwood stuck in a floe, the first object from the outside world they had seen since Fram had entered the ice. Johansen carved his and Nansen's initials on it, with the latitude and date. A day or two later they spotted the tracks of an Arctic fox, the first trace of a living creature other than their dogs since leaving Fram. Other tracks soon appeared, and Nansen began to believe that land might be near.

Map of Franz Josef Land showing the route of Nansen and Johansen through the islands, August 1895 to June 1896

The latitude calculated on 9 May, 84°3′N, was disappointing—Nansen had hoped they were farther south. However, as May progressed they began to see bear tracks, and by the end of the month seals, gulls and whales were plentiful. By Nansen's calculations, they had reached 82°21′N on 31 May, placing them only 50 nautical miles (93 km; 58 mi) from Cape Fligely at the northern extremity of Franz Josef Land, if his longitude estimate was accurate. In the warmer weather the ice began to break up, making travel more difficult. Since 24 April dogs had been killed at regular intervals to feed the others, and by the beginning of June only seven of the original 28 remained. On 21 June the pair jettisoned all surplus equipment and supplies, planning to travel light and live off the now plentiful supplies of seal and birds. After a day's travel in this manner they decided to rest on a floe, waterproof the kayaks and build up their own strength for the next stage of their journey. They remained camped on the floe for a whole month.

On 23 July, the day after leaving the camp, Nansen had the first indisputable glimpse of land. He wrote: "At last the marvel has come to pass—land, land, and after we had almost given up our belief in it!" In the succeeding days the pair struggled towards this land, which seemingly grew no nearer, although by the end of July they could hear the distant sound of breaking surf. On 4 August they survived a polar bear attack; two days later they reached the edge of the ice, and only water lay between them and the land. On 6 August they shot the last two dogs, converted the kayaks into a catamaran by lashing sledges and skis across them, and raised a sail.

Nansen called this first land "Hvidtenland" ("White Island"). After making camp on an ice foot they ascended a slope and looked about them. It was apparent that they were in an archipelago, but what they could see bore no relation to their incomplete map of Franz Josef Land. They could only continue south in the hopes of finding a geographical feature they could pinpoint with certainty. On 16 August Nansen tentatively identified a headland as Cape Felder, marked on Payer's maps as on the western coast of Franz Josef Land. Nansen's objective was now to reach a hut with supplies at a location known as Eira Harbour, at the southern end of the islands. An expedition led by Benjamin Leigh Smith had constructed it in 1881. However, contrary winds and loose ice made further progress in the kayak hazardous, and on 28 August Nansen decided that, with another polar winter drawing near, they should stay where they were and await the following spring.

=== To Cape Flora ===
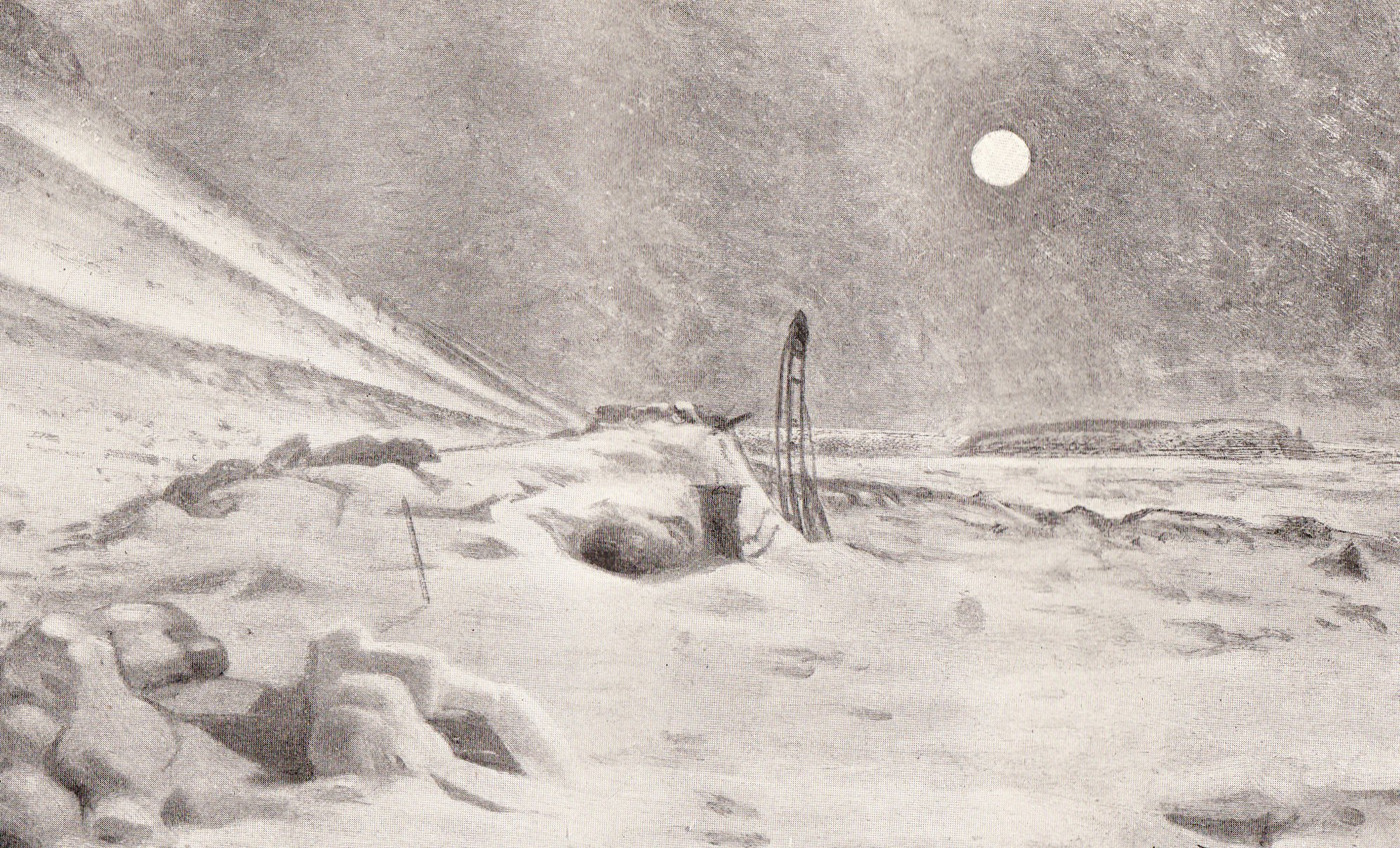
The hut on Franz Josef Land, covered in snow, in which Nansen and Johansen spent the winter of 1895–96. A drawing, based on Nansen's photograph.

As the base for their winter quarters, Nansen and Johansen found a beach in a sheltered cove on what is now called Jackson Island, with a plentiful supply of stones and moss for building materials. They excavated a hole three feet deep, raised walls around it using loose rocks and stones, and stretched walrus skins over the top to form a roof. A chimney was improvised using snow and walrus bones. This shelter, which they called "The Hole", was finally ready on 28 September, and was to be their home for the next eight months. Their situation was uncomfortable, but not life-threatening; there was a plentiful supply of bear, walrus and seal to stock up their larder. The chief enemy was boredom; to pass time they were reduced to reading Nansen's sailing almanac and navigation tables by the light of their blubber lamp, and then reading them again.

At Christmas the pair celebrated with chocolate and bread from their sledging rations. On New Year's Eve Johansen recorded that Nansen finally adopted the familiar form of address, having until then maintained formalities ("Mr Johansen", "Professor Nansen") throughout the journey. In the New Year they fashioned themselves simple outer clothing—smocks and trousers—from a discarded sleeping bag, in readiness for the resumption of their journey when the weather grew warmer. On 19 May 1896, after weeks of preparation, they were ready. Nansen left a note in the hut to inform a possible finder: "We are going south west, along the land, to cross over to Spitsbergen".

For more than two weeks they followed the shoreline southwards. Nothing they saw seemed to fit with their rudimentary map of Franz Josef Land, and Nansen speculated whether they were in uncharted lands between Franz Josef Land and Spitsbergen. On 4 June a change in conditions allowed them to launch their kayaks for the first time since leaving their winter quarters. A week later, Nansen was forced to dive into the icy waters to rescue the kayaks which, still tied together, had drifted away after being carelessly moored. He managed to reach the craft and, with a last effort, to haul himself aboard. Despite his frozen condition he shot and retrieved two guillemots as he paddled the catamaran back.

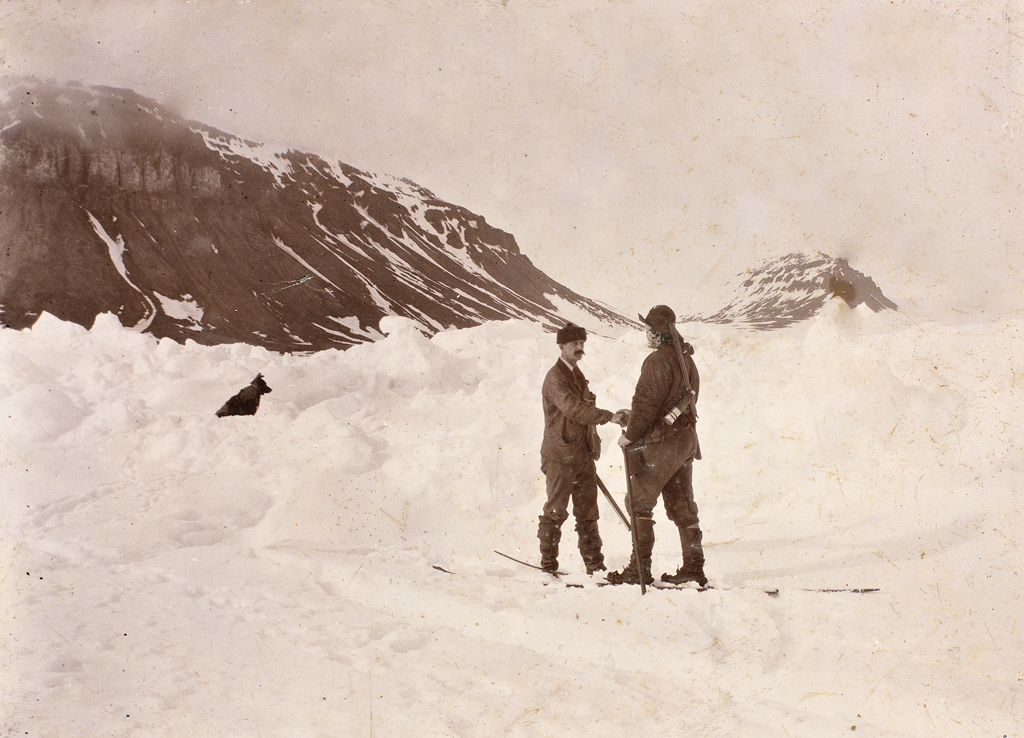
The Nansen–Jackson meeting at Cape Flora, 17 June 1896 (a posed photograph taken hours after the initial meeting)

On 13 June walruses attacked and damaged the kayaks, causing another stop for repairs. On 17 June, as they prepared to leave again, Nansen thought he heard a dog bark and went to investigate. He then heard voices, and a few minutes later encountered a human being. It was Frederick Jackson, who had organised his own expedition to Franz Josef Land after being rejected by Nansen, and had based his headquarters at Cape Flora on Northbrook Island, the southernmost island of the archipelago. Jackson's own account records that his first reaction to this sudden meeting was to assume the figure to be a shipwrecked sailor, perhaps from the expedition's supply ship Windward which was due to call that summer. As he approached, Jackson saw "a tall man, wearing a soft felt hat, loosely made, voluminous clothes and long shaggy hair and beard, all reeking with black grease". After a moment's awkward hesitation, Jackson recognised his visitor: "You are Nansen, aren't you?", and received the reply "Yes, I am Nansen."

Johansen was rescued, and the pair taken to the base at Cape Flora, where they posed for photographs (in one instance re-enacting the Jackson–Nansen meeting) before taking baths and haircuts. Both men seemed in good health, despite their ordeal; Nansen had put on 21 pounds (9.5 kg) in weight since the start of the expedition, and Johansen 13 pounds (5.9 kg). In honour of his rescuer, Nansen named the island where he had wintered "Frederick Jackson Island". For the next six weeks Nansen had little to do but await the arrival of Windward, worrying that he might have to spend the winter at Cape Flora, and sometimes regretting that he and Johansen had not pressed on to Spitsbergen. Johansen noted in his journal that Nansen had changed from the overbearing personality of the Fram days, and was now subdued and polite, adamant that he would never undertake such a journey again. On 26 July Windward finally arrived; on 7 August, with Nansen and Johansen aboard, she sailed south and on 13 August reached Vardø. A batch of telegrams was sent, informing the world of Nansen's safe return.

=== Drift (second phase) ===
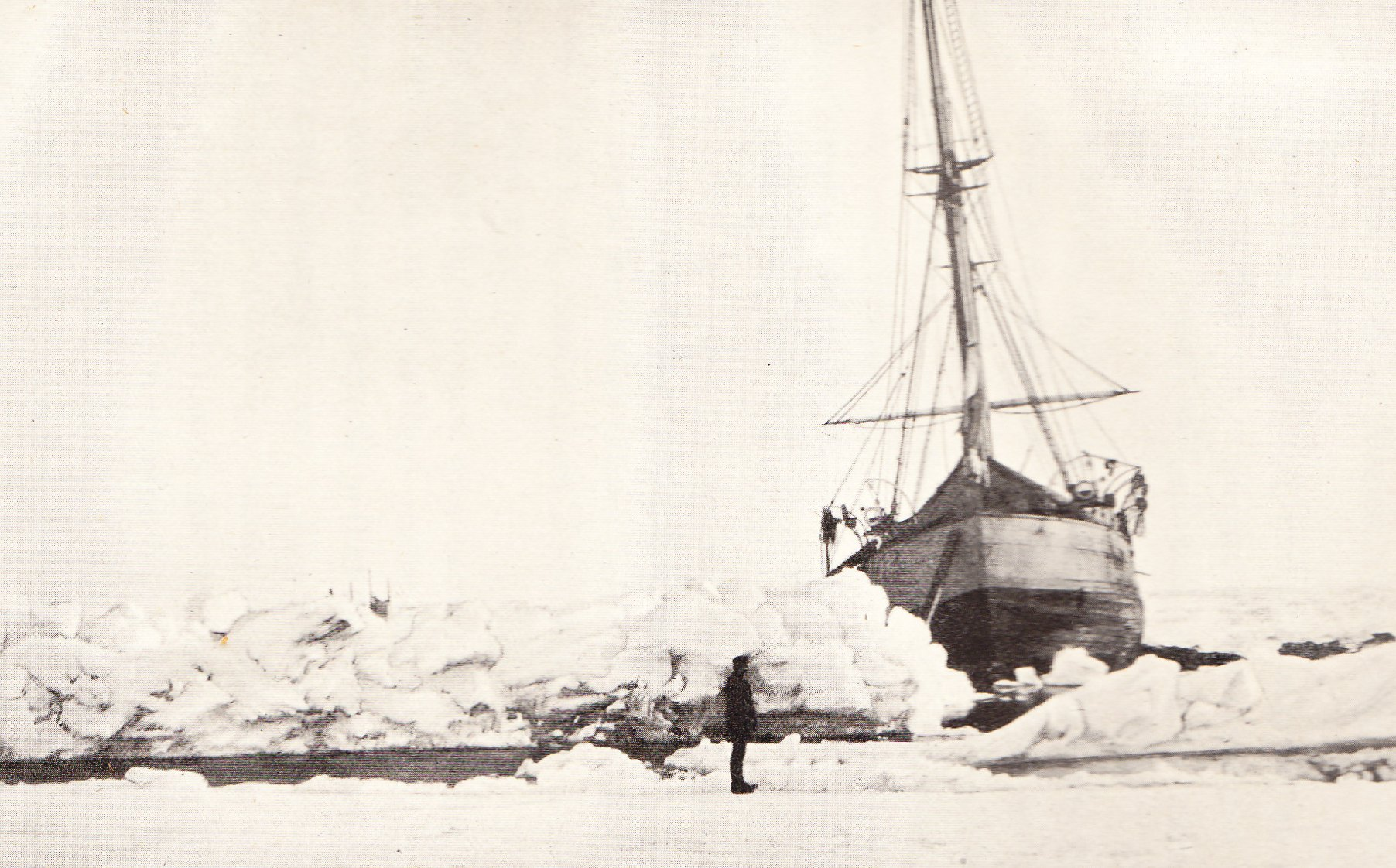
A lead of water opens in front of Fram, May 1896

Before his departure from Fram, Nansen appointed Sverdrup as leader of the rest of the expedition, with orders to continue with the drift towards the Atlantic Ocean unless circumstances warranted abandoning the ship and marching for land. Nansen left precise instructions about keeping up the scientific work, especially the ocean depth soundings and the tests for the thickness of the ice. He concluded: "May we meet in Norway, whether it be on board of this vessel or without her."

Sverdrup's main task now was to keep his crew busy. He ordered a thorough spring cleaning, and set a party to chip away some of the surrounding ice which was threatening to destabilise the ship. Although there was no immediate danger to Fram, Sverdrup oversaw the repair and overhaul of sledges, and the organisation of provisions should it after all be necessary to abandon ship and march to land. With the arrival of warmer weather as the 1895 summer approached, Sverdrup resumed daily ski practice. Amid these activities a full programme of meteorological, magnetic and oceanographic activities continued under Scott Hansen; Fram had become a moving oceanographic, meteorological and biological laboratory.

As the drift proceeded the ocean became deeper; soundings gave successive depths of 6,000 feet (1,800 m), 9,000 and 12,000 feet (2,700 and 3,700 m), a progression which indicated that no undiscovered land mass was nearby. On 15 November 1895 Fram reached 85°55′N, only 19 nautical miles (35 km; 22 mi) below Nansen's Farthest North mark. From this point on, the drift was generally to the south and west, although progress was for long periods almost imperceptible. Inactivity and boredom led to increased drinking; Scott Hansen recorded that Christmas and New Year passed "with the usual hot punch and consequent hangover", and wrote that he was "getting more and more disgusted with drunkenness". By mid-March 1896, the position was 84°25′N, 12°50′E, placing the ship north of Spitsbergen. On 13 June a lead opened and, for the first time in nearly three years, Fram became a living ship. It was a further two months, on 13 August 1896, before she found open water and, with a blast from her cannon, left the ice behind. She had emerged from the ice just north and west of Spitsbergen, close to Nansen's original prediction, proving him right and his detractors wrong. Later that same day a ship was sighted—Søstrone, a seal hunter from Tromsø. Sverdrup rowed across for news, and learned that nothing had been heard from Nansen. Fram called briefly at Spitsbergen, where the Swedish explorer-engineer Salomon Andrée was preparing for the balloon flight that he hoped would take him to the pole. After a short time ashore, Sverdrup and his crew began the trip south to Norway.

== Reunion and reception ==
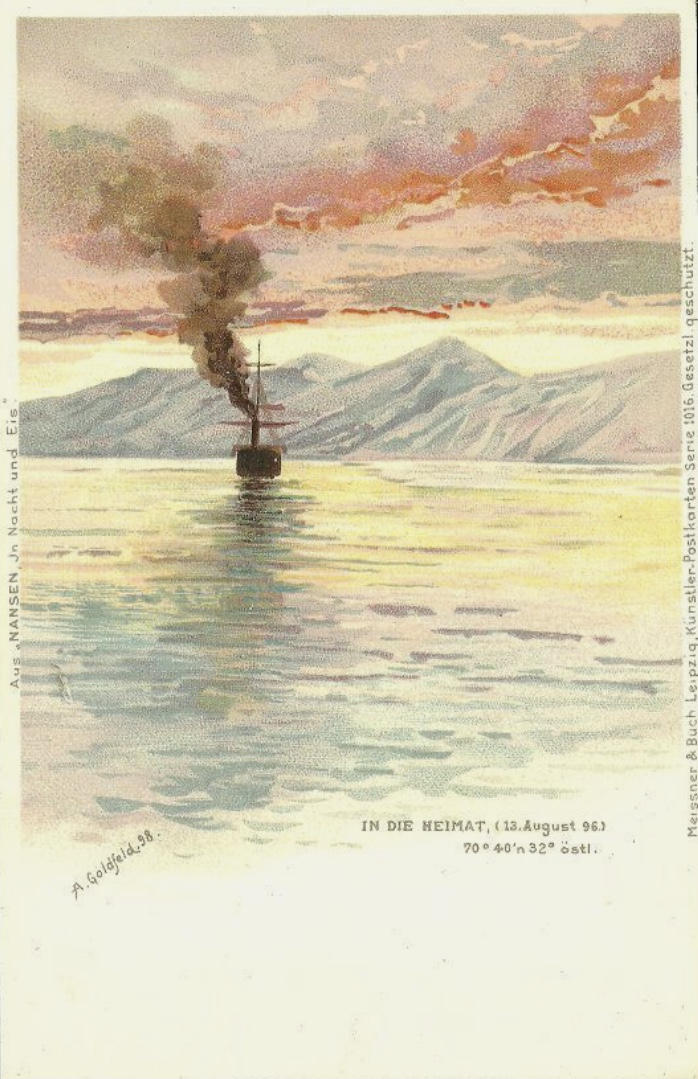
In die Heimat ("Going Home"), German chromolithograph showing Fram at the end of the expedition

In the course of the expedition, rumours circulated that Nansen had reached the North Pole, the first as early as April 1894, in the French Newspaper Le Figaro. In September 1895 Eva Nansen was informed that messages signed by Nansen had been discovered, "sent from the North Pole". In February 1896 The New York Times ran a dispatch from Irkutsk, in Siberia, from a supposed Nansen agent, claiming that Nansen had reached the pole and found land there. Charles P. Daly of the American Geographical Society called this "startling news" and, "if true, the most important discovery that has been made in ages."

Experts were sceptical of all such reports, and Nansen's arrival in Vardø quickly put paid to them. In Vardø, he and Johansen were greeted by Professor Mohn, the originator of the polar drift theory, who was in the town by chance. The pair waited for the weekly mail steamer to take them south, and on 18 August arrived in Hammerfest to an enthusiastic reception. The lack of news about Fram was preying on Nansen's mind; however, on 20 August he received news that Sverdrup had brought the ship to the tiny port of Skjervøy, south of Hammerfest, and was now continuing with her to Tromsø. The next day, Nansen and Johansen sailed into Tromsø and joined their comrades in an emotional reunion.

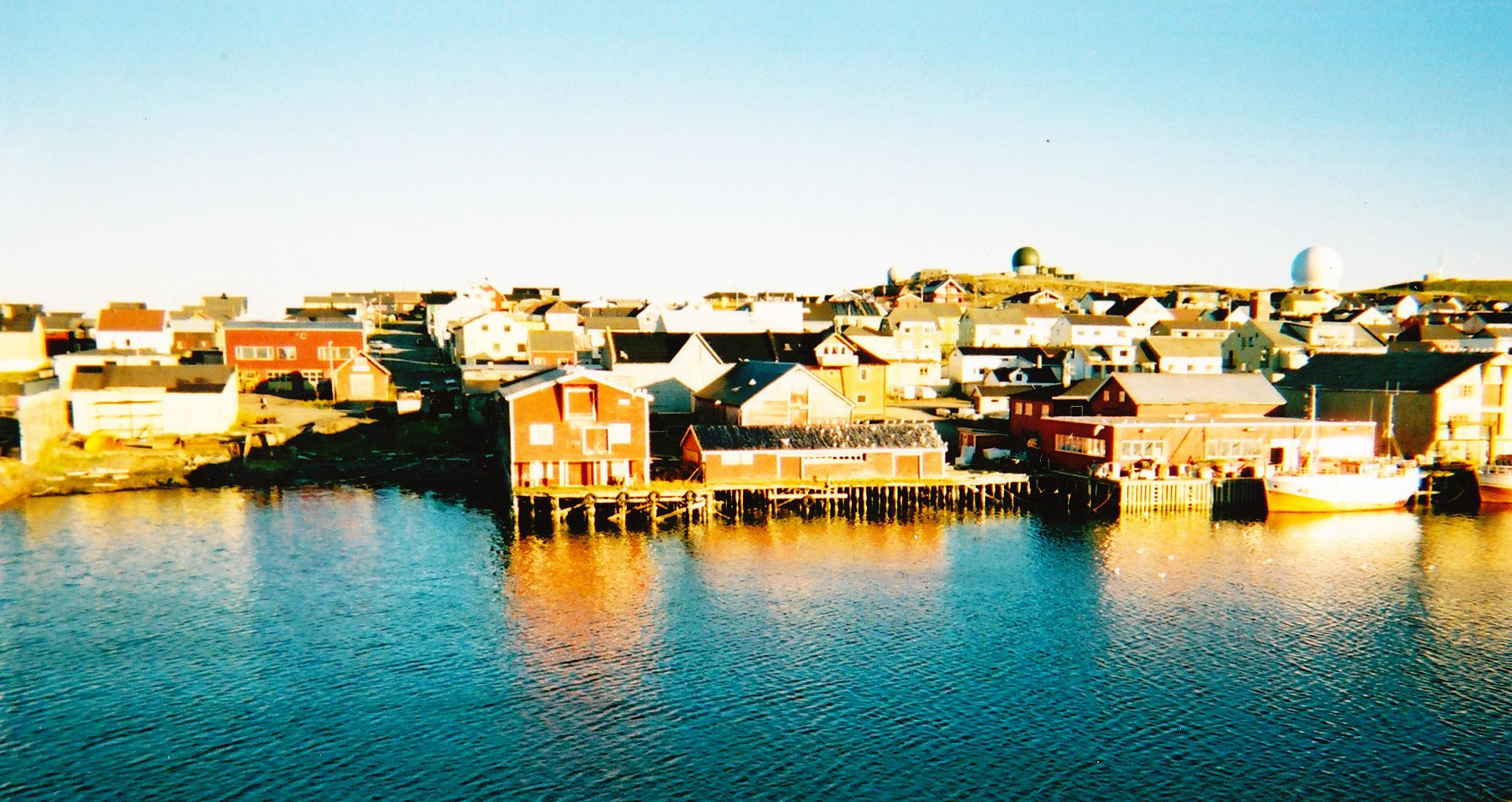
The port of Vardø in northern Norway, where Nansen and Johansen returned to Norwegian soil on 13 August 1896

After days of celebration and recuperation the ship left Tromsø on 26 August. The voyage south was a triumphal procession, with receptions at every port. Fram finally arrived in Christiania on 9 September, escorted into the harbour by a squadron of warships and welcomed by thousands—the largest crowds the city had ever seen, according to Huntford. Nansen and his crew were received by King Oscar; on the way to the reception they passed through a triumphal arch formed by 200 gymnasts. Nansen and his family stayed at the palace as special guests of the king; by contrast, Johansen remained in the background, largely overlooked, and writing that "reality, after all, is not so wonderful as it appeared to me in the midst of our hard life."

== Assessment and aftermath ==
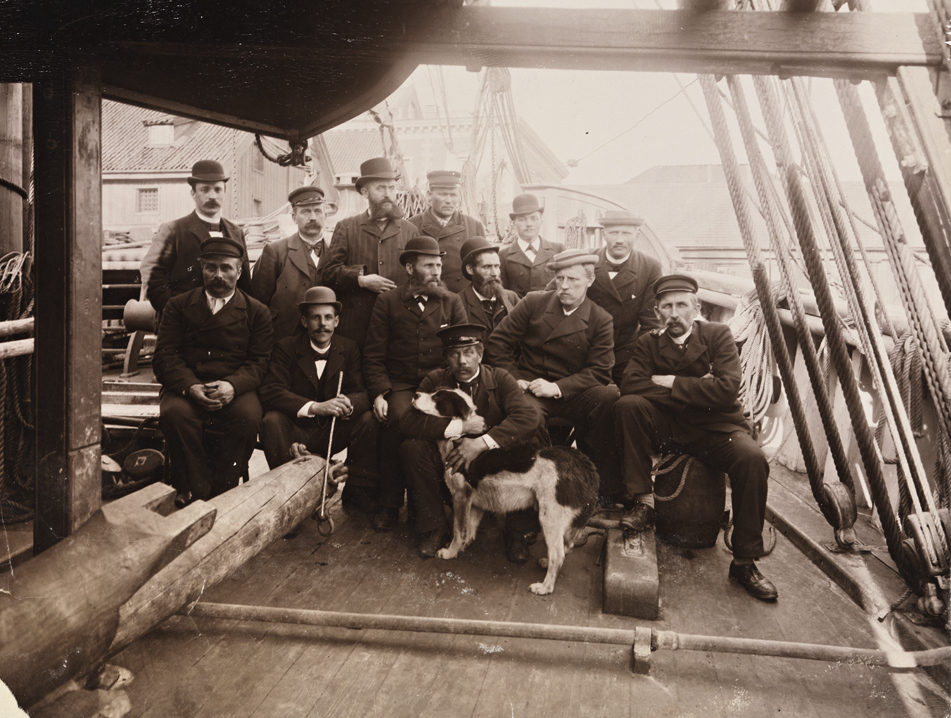
Expedition members after Fram's return to Christiania in August 1896. Back row, l. to r.: Blessing, Nordhal, Mogstad, Henriksen, Pettersen, Johansen. Seated: Bentzen, Scott Hansen, Sverdrup, Amundsen (with dog), Jacobsen, Nansen, Juell

The traditional approach to Arctic exploration had relied on large-scale forces, with a presumption that European techniques could be successfully transplanted into the hostile polar climate. Over the years this strategy had brought little success, and had led to heavy losses of men and ships. By contrast, Nansen's method of using small, trained crews, and harnessing Inuit and Sami expertise in his methods of travel, had ensured that his expedition was completed without a single casualty or major mishap.

Although it did not achieve the objective of reaching the North Pole, the expedition made major geographical and scientific discoveries. Sir Clements Markham, president of Britain's Royal Geographical Society, declared that the expedition had resolved "the whole problem of Arctic geography". It was now established that the North Pole was located not on land, nor on a permanent ice sheet, but on shifting, unpredictable pack ice. The Arctic Ocean was a deep basin, with no significant land masses north of the Eurasian continent—any hidden expanse of land would have blocked the free movement of ice. (Note: Nansen was prepared to admit the possibility of undiscovered land on the North American side.) Nansen had proved the polar drift theory; furthermore, he had noted the presence of a Coriolis force driving the ice to the right of the wind direction, due to the effect of the Earth's rotation. This discovery would be developed by Nansen's pupil, Vagn Walfrid Ekman, who later became the leading oceanographer of his time. From its programme of scientific observation the expedition provided the first detailed oceanographic information from the area; in due course the scientific data gathered during the Fram voyage would run to six published volumes.

Throughout the expedition Nansen continued to experiment with equipment and techniques, altering the designs of skis and sledges and investigating types of clothing, tents and cooking apparatus, thereby revolutionising methods of Arctic travel. In the era of polar exploration which followed his return, explorers routinely sought Nansen's advice as to methods and equipment—although sometimes they chose not to follow it, usually to their cost. According to Huntford, the South Pole heroes Amundsen, Scott, and Ernest Shackleton were all Nansen's acolytes.

Nansen's status was never seriously challenged, although he did not escape criticism. American explorer Robert Peary wondered why Nansen had not returned to the ship when his polar dash was thwarted after a mere three weeks away. "Was he ashamed to go back after so short an absence, or had there been a row ... or did he go off for Franz Josef Land from sensational motives or business reasons?" Adolphus Greely, who had initially dismissed the entire expedition as infeasible, admitted that he had been proved wrong but nevertheless drew attention to "the single blemish"—Nansen's decision to leave his comrades hundreds of miles from land. "It passes comprehension", Greely wrote, "how Nansen could have thus deviated from the most sacred duty devolving on the commander of a naval expedition." Nansen's reputation nevertheless survived; a hundred years after the expedition the British explorer Wally Herbert called the Fram voyage "one of the most inspiring examples of courageous intelligence in the history of exploration".

The Fram voyage was Nansen's final expedition. He was appointed to a research professorship at the University of Christiania in 1897, and to a full professorship in oceanography in 1908. He became independently wealthy as a result of the publication of his expedition account; in his later career he served the newly independent kingdom of Norway in different capacities, and was awarded the Nobel Peace Prize for 1922, in recognition of his work on behalf of refugees. It is said that Hjalmar Johansen never settled back into normal life, and after years of drifting, debt and domestic problems he was given the opportunity, through Nansen's influence, to join Roald Amundsen's South Pole expedition in 1910. After bringing back one half-dead companion from the so-called "false start" to the Pole, Johansen, being just as experienced as Amundsen, quarreled violently with Amundsen at the expedition's base camp, and was thus omitted from the South Pole party. He died by suicide within a year of his return from Antarctica. In later years, through investigation of historical records, Hjalmar Johansen was recognized as one of the five prime Norwegian polar explorers, alongside Fritjof Nansen, Roald Amundsen, Otto Sverdrup, and Carsten Borchgrevink. Otto Sverdrup remained as captain of Fram, and in 1898 took the ship, with a new crew, to the Canadian Arctic for four years' exploration. In later years Sverdrup helped to raise funds that enabled the ship to be restored and housed in a permanent museum. He died in November 1930, seven months after Nansen's death.

Nansen's farthest north record lasted for just over five years. On 24 April 1900 a party of three from an Italian expedition led by the Duke of the Abruzzi reached 86°34′N, having left Franz Josef Land with dogs and sledges on 11 March. The party barely made it back; one of their support groups of three men vanished entirely.

== Sources ==
- Aber, James A. (2006). "History of Geology: Fridtjof Nansen 1861–1930". Emporia State University.
- Berton, Pierre (1988). The Arctic Grail. New York: Viking Penguin. ISBN 978-0-670-82491-5.
- Capelotti, Peter Joseph (2013). Shipwreck at Cape Flora: The Expeditions of Benjamin Leigh Smith. University of Calgary Press. ISBN 978-1-55238-705-4.
- Fairley, T.C. (1959). Sverdrup's Arctic Adventures. London: Longmans, Green.
- Fleming, Fergus (2002). Ninety Degrees North. London: Granta Publications. ISBN 978-1-86207-535-1.
- "Fridtjof Nansen: The Nobel Peace Prize 1922". NobelPrize.org.
- "Dr. Nansen's Arctic trip: has nature supplied a route around the North Pole?" (PDF). New York Times. 13 November 1892.
- Herbert, Wally (1989). The Noose of Laurels. London: Hodder & Stoughton. ISBN 978-0-340-41276-3.
- Holland, Clive, ed. (1994). Farthest North. London: Robinson Publishing. ISBN 978-1-84119-099-0.
- Huntford, Roland (2001). Nansen. London: Abacus. ISBN 978-0-349-11492-7.
- Jackson, Frederick (1935). The Lure of Unknown Lands. London: G. Bell and Sons.
- Jones, Max (2003). The Last Great Quest. Oxford: Oxford University Press. ISBN 978-0-19-280483-9.
- Krishfield, Rick. "Nansen and the Drift of the Fram (1893–1896)". Beaufort Gyre Exploration Project. Woods Hole Oceanographic Institution.
- Nansen, Fridtjof (1897). Farthest North, Volumes I and II. London: Archibald Constable & Co.
- "Nansen's North Pole Search" (PDF). New York Times. 3 March 1895. (subscription required)
- Preston, Diana (1997). A First Rate Tragedy. London: Constable & Co. ISBN 978-0-09-479530-3.
- Riffenburgh, Beau (2005). Nimrod. London: Bloomsbury Publications. ISBN 978-0-7475-7253-4.
- Savours, Ann (2001). The Voyages of the Discovery. London: Chatham Publishing. ISBN 978-1-86176-149-1.
- "V. Walfrid Ekman". Encyclopædia Britannica.
- "Will Nansen Come Back?" (PDF). New York Times. 3 March 1895. (subscription required)
