= Sofie Helene Wigert =

Norwegian ship owner, Riksmål activist and magazine editor

- Born: Sofie Helene Olsen; 25 August 1913
- Died: 9 September 1989 (aged 76)
- Occupations: Ship owner, Riksmål activist and magazine editor
- Spouses: Henrik Jørgen Schibsted Huitfeldt (m. 1935) Knut Wigert (m. 1950)
- Father: Rudolf Fredrik Olsen

Sofie Helene Wigert (née Olsen; 25 August 1913 – 9 September 1989) was a Norwegian ship owner, Riksmål activist and magazine editor.

She was daughter of ship owner Rudolf Fredrik Olsen. She was married to newspaper editor Henrik Jørgen Schibsted Huitfeldt from 1935, and to actor Knut Wigert from 1950 until her death. She was a co-founder of "Foreldreaksjonen mot samnorsk" in 1951, and established the periodical Frisprog in 1953, which she edited until 1981 (together with Margrete Aamot Øverland until her death in 1979). In 1956 she established the shipping company Olsen Daughter.
