= Margrete Aamot Øverland =

Norwegian resistance member (1913–1978)

Margrete Aamot Øverland (11 February 1913 – 20 November 1978) was a Norwegian resistance member during the Second World War, and later editor of the Riksmål newspaper Frisprog.

== Biography ==
A journalist in the social democrat newspaper Den 1ste Mai, she met her future husband Arnulf Øverland for the first time in 1934. He was one of Norway's most prominent writers and essayists. The couple moved-in together in the summer of 1940, shortly after the German invasion of Norway (Operation Weserübung).

Based in their Oslo home, they distributed Øverland's anti-fascist poetry, which was deemed illegal by the occupiers. Both were arrested in June 1941. Aamot was sent to Grini concentration camp and later Ravensbrück. However, both survived. In 1946 they moved in at Grotten. Arnulf died in 1968, Margrete in 1978.
