= Oluf Christian Dietrichson =

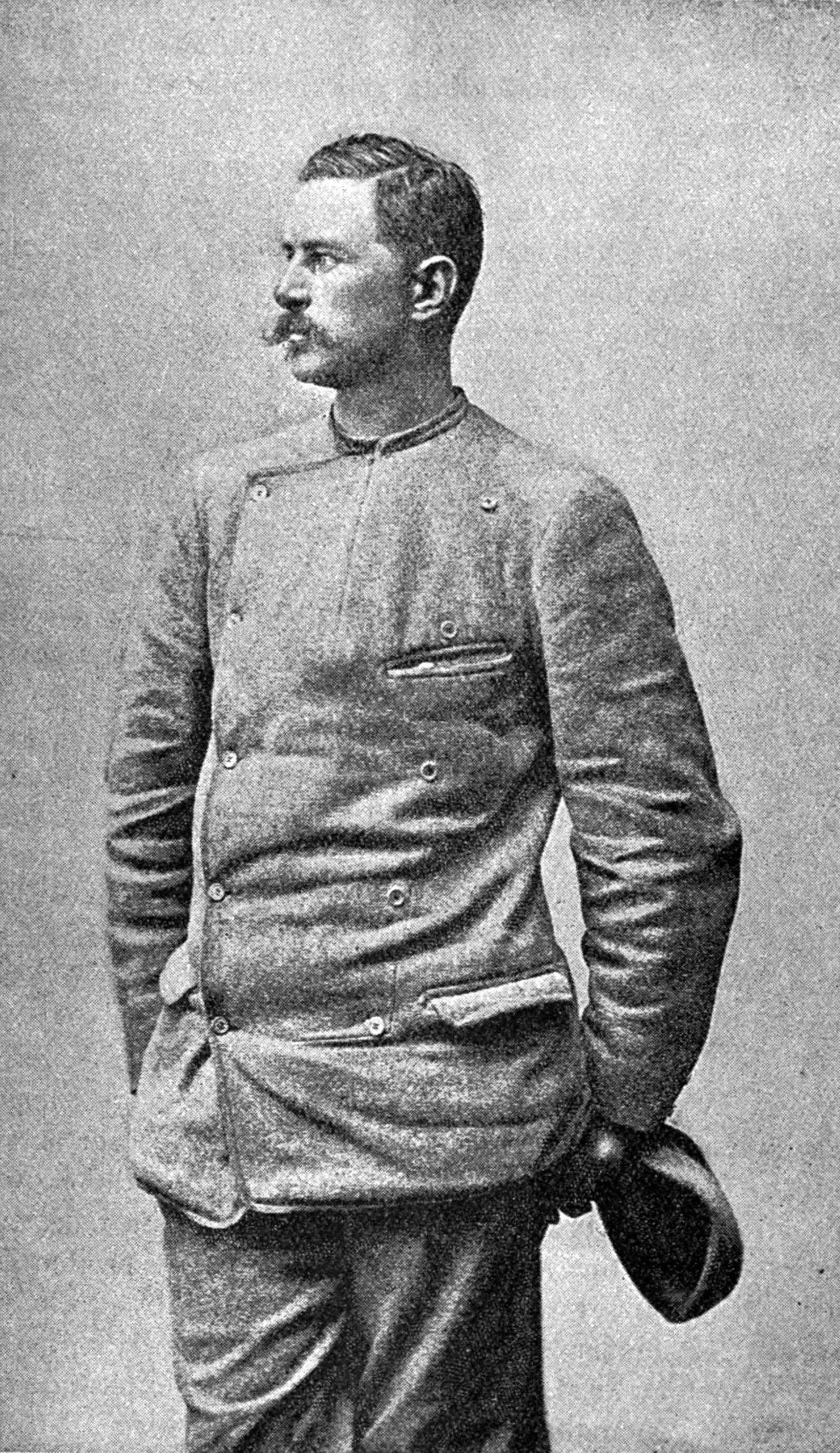
Oluf Christian Dietrichson

Oluf Christian Dietrichson (3 May 1856 – 20 February 1942) was a Norwegian explorer and military officer. He was a member of the Greenland expedition of 1888 led by Fridtjof Nansen, the first documented crossing of Greenland.

Oluf Dietrichson was born in Skogn Municipality (now part of Levanger Municipality) in Nordre Trondheim county, Norway. His father, Peter Wilhelm Kreidahl Dietrichson, was employed as the senior doctor at the Nord-Trøndelag Hospital. He received a military education and was commanding officer in Kristiansand from 1918 to 1924. Dietrichson continued his military career and advanced to Major General.

In 1888, Fridtjof Nansen assembling a team for the purpose of crossing the Greenlandic ice-sheet. Dietrichson participated as a metrological surveyor, surveyor and map marker. The other participants at the Greenland expedition were Otto Sverdrup, Samuel Balto, Ole Nielsen Ravna and Kristian Kristiansen.

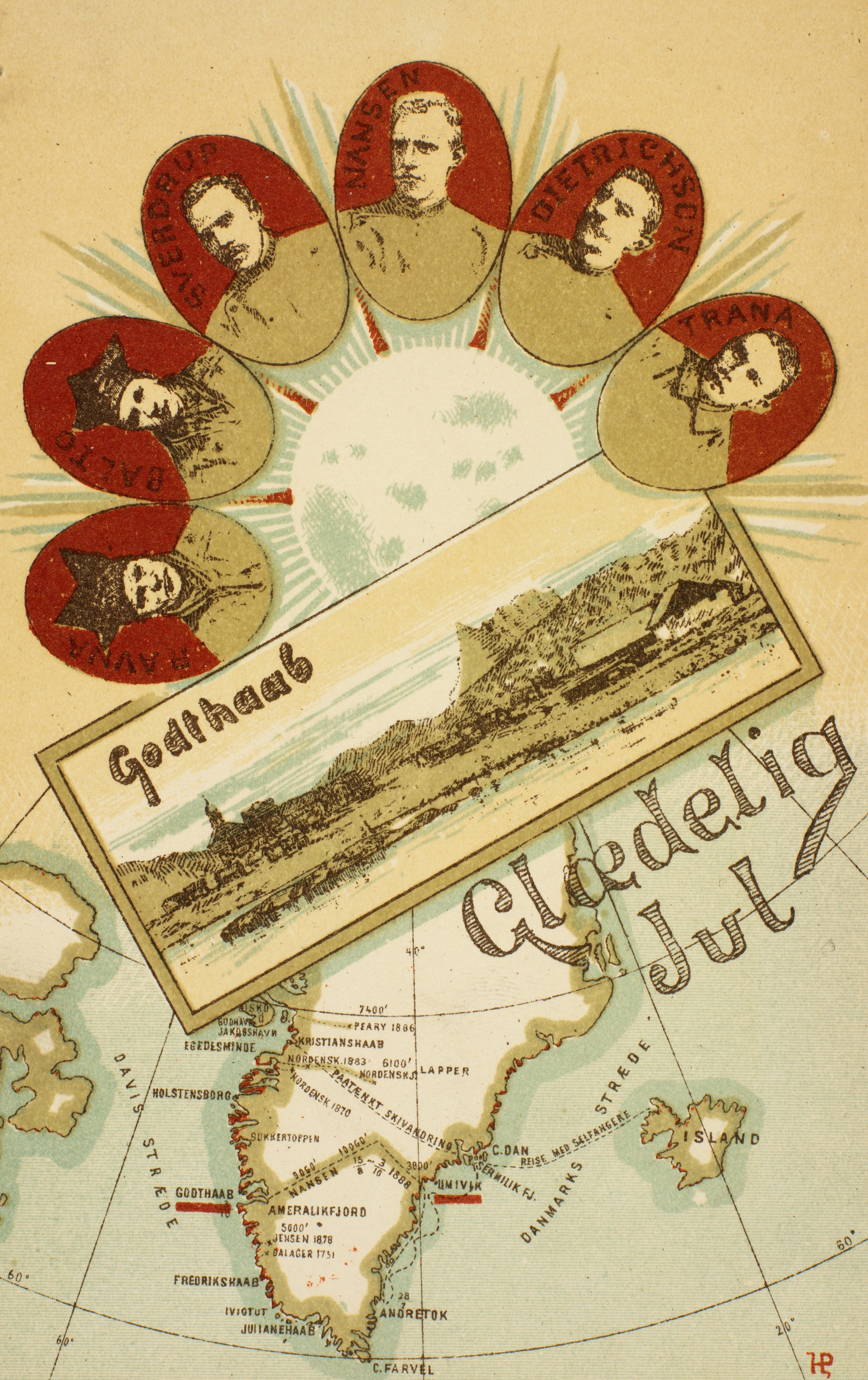
Postcard with portraits of the members of the Greenland Expedition: Ole Nielsen Ravna, Samuel Balto, Otto Sverdrup, Fridtjof Nansen, Oluf Christian Dietrichson and Kristian Kristiansen

== Other sources ==
- Nansen, Fridtjof (tr. H.M. Gepp) (1890). The First Crossing of Greenland. London: Longmans, Green. ISBN 978-1-108-03109-7.
