= Kristian Kristiansen =

Kristian Kristiansen may refer to:

- Kristian Kristiansen (writer) (1909–1980), Norwegian writer
- Kristian Kristiansen (explorer) (1865–1943), Norwegian explorer who participated in the first documented crossing of Greenland
- Kristian Kristiansen (archaeologist) (born 1948), Danish archaeologist and professor at the University of Gothenburg
