= Fridtjof Nansen =

Norwegian explorer and Nobel Peace Prize laureate (1861–1930)

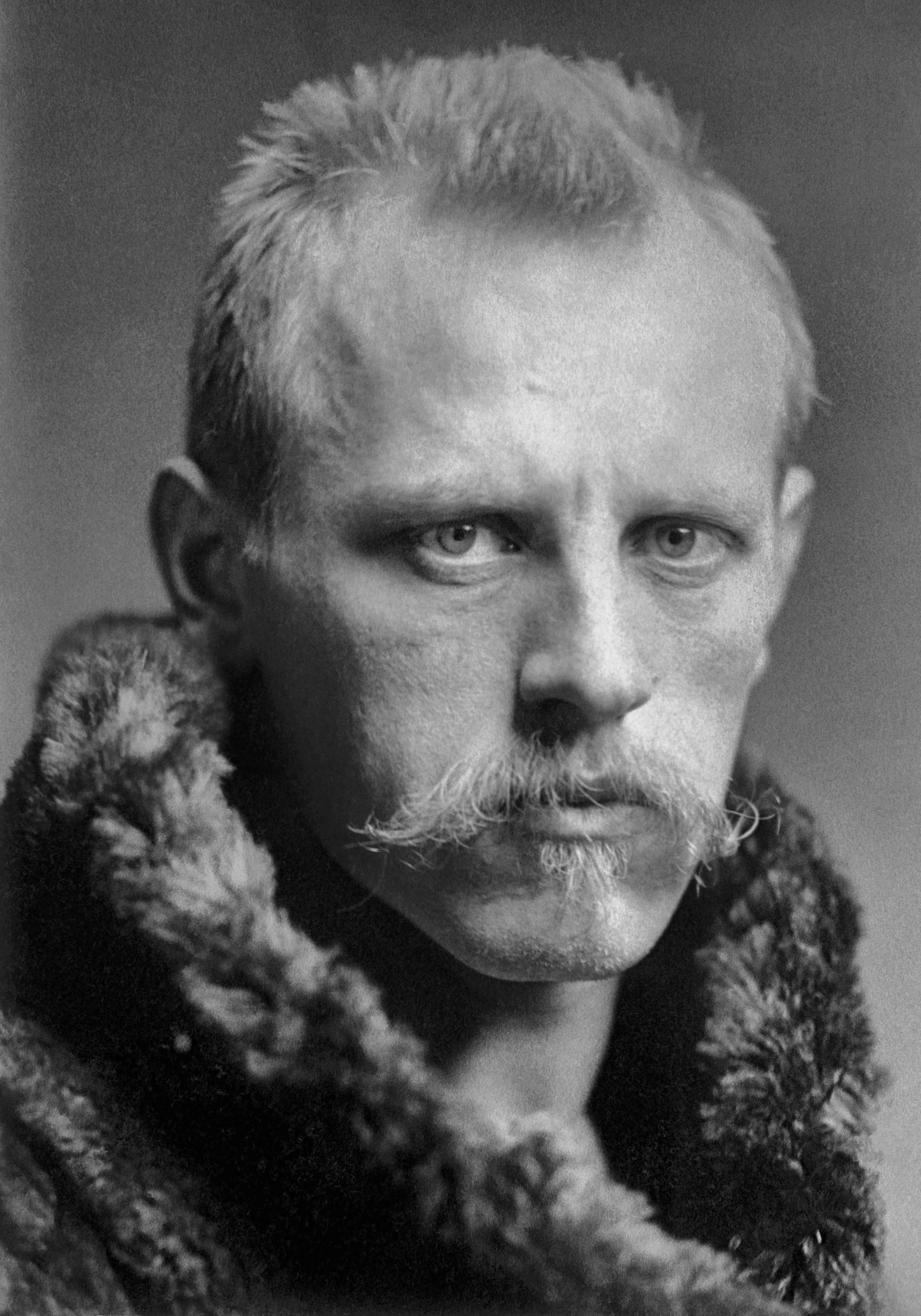
- Nansen in 1890
- Born: 10 October 1861; Store Frøen, Christiania, Sweden–Norway
- Died: 13 May 1930 (aged 68); Polhøgda, Lysaker, Norway
- Education: Royal Frederick University
- Occupations: Scientist; explorer; diplomat; humanitarian
- Known for: Dead water; Nansen bottle; Nansen Ice Sheet; Nansen passport; Nansen's Fram expedition; Oceanography; Polar meteorology
- Spouses: Eva Sars (m. 1889; died 1907); Sigrun Munthe (m. 1919)
- Children: 5, including Odd
- Relatives: Ernst Sars (brother-in-law); Georg Ossian Sars (brother-in-law); Axel Revold (son-in-law); Marit Greve (granddaughter); Eigil Nansen (grandson); Dagny Hald (granddaughter)
- Awards: Nobel Peace Prize (1922); Constantine Medal (1907); Cullum Geographical Medal (1897); Great Gold Medal of Exploration and Journeys of Discovery (1897); Patron's Medal (1891); Vega Medal (1889)

Fridtjof Wedel-Jarlsberg Nansen (Norwegian: [ˈfrɪ̂tːjɔf ˈnɑ̀nsn̩]; 10 October 1861 – 13 May 1930) was a Norwegian polymath and Nobel Peace Prize laureate. He gained prominence at various points in his life as an explorer, a scientist, a diplomat, a humanitarian, and the co-founder of the Fatherland League.

Nansen led the team that made the first crossing of the Greenland interior in 1888, traversing the island on cross-country skis. He won international fame after reaching a record northern latitude of 86°14′ during his Fram expedition of 1893–1896. Although he retired from exploration after his return to Norway, his techniques of polar travel and his innovations in equipment and clothing influenced a generation of subsequent Arctic and Antarctic expeditions. He was elected an International Member of the American Philosophical Society in 1897.

Nansen studied zoology at the Royal Frederick University in Christiania and later worked as a curator at the University Museum of Bergen where his research on the central nervous system of lower marine creatures earned him a doctorate and helped establish neuron doctrine. Later, neuroscientist Santiago Ramón y Cajal won the 1906 Nobel Prize in Medicine for his research on the same subject. After 1896 his main scientific interest switched to oceanography; in the course of his research he made many scientific cruises, mainly in the North Atlantic, and contributed to the development of modern oceanographic equipment.

As one of his country's leading citizens, in 1905 Nansen spoke out for ending Norway's union with Sweden, and was instrumental in persuading Prince Carl of Denmark to accept the throne of the newly independent Norway. Between 1906 and 1908, he served as the Norwegian representative in London, where he helped negotiate the Integrity Treaty that guaranteed Norway's independent status.

In the final decade of his life, Nansen devoted himself primarily to the League of Nations, following his appointment in 1921 as the League's High Commissioner for Refugees. In 1922 he was awarded the Nobel Peace Prize for his work on behalf of the displaced victims of World War I and related conflicts. Among the initiatives he introduced was the "Nansen passport" for stateless people, a certificate that was recognized by more than 50 countries. He worked on behalf of refugees alongside Vidkun Quisling until his sudden death in 1930, after which the League established the Nansen International Office for Refugees to ensure that his work continued. This office received the Nobel Peace Prize in 1938. His name is commemorated in numerous geographical features, particularly in the polar regions.

== Family background and childhood ==
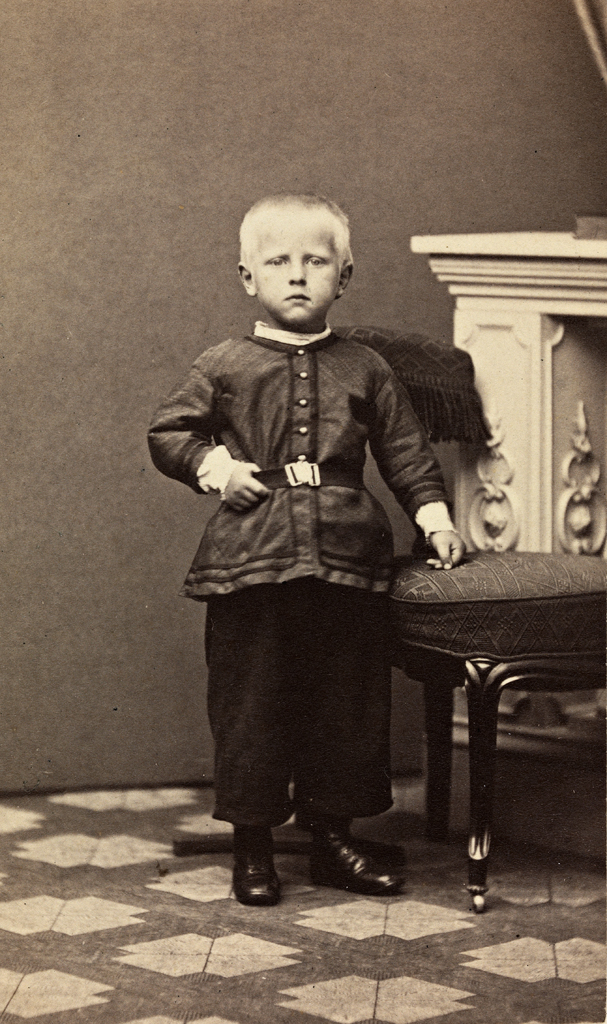
Nansen in 1865 (age 4)

The Nansen family originated from Denmark. Hans Nansen, a trader, was an early explorer of the White Sea region of the Arctic Ocean. In later life he settled in Copenhagen, becoming the city's borgmester in 1654. Later generations of the family lived in Copenhagen until the mid-18th century, when Ancher Antoni Nansen moved to Norway (then in a union with Denmark). His son, Hans Leierdahl Nansen, was a magistrate first in the Trondheim district, later in Jæren. After Norway's separation from Denmark in 1814, he entered national political life as the representative for Stavanger in the first Storting, and became a strong advocate of union with Sweden. After suffering a paralytic stroke in 1821 Hans Leierdahl Nansen died, leaving a four-year-old son, Baldur Fridtjof Nansen, the explorer's father.

Baldur was a lawyer without ambitions for public life, who became Reporter to the Supreme Court of Norway. He married twice, the second time to Adelaide Johanne Thekla Isidore Bølling Wedel-Jarlsberg from Bærum, a niece of Herman Wedel-Jarlsberg who had helped frame the Norwegian constitution of 1814 and was later the Swedish king's Norwegian Viceroy. Baldur and Adelaide settled at Store Frøen, an estate at Aker, a few kilometres north of Norway's capital city, Christiania (since renamed Oslo). The couple had three children; the first died in infancy, the second, born 10 October 1861, was Fridtjof Wedel-Jarlsberg Nansen.

Store Frøen's rural surroundings shaped the nature of Nansen's childhood. In the short summers the main activities were swimming and fishing, while in the autumn the chief pastime was hunting for game in the forests. The long winter months were devoted mainly to skiing, which Nansen began to practice at the age of two, on improvised skis. At the age of 10 he defied his parents and attempted the ski jump at the nearby Huseby installation. This exploit had near-disastrous consequences, as on landing the skis dug deep into the snow, pitching the boy forward: "I, head first, described a fine arc in the air ... [W]hen I came down again I bored into the snow up to my waist. The boys thought I had broken my neck, but as soon as they saw there was life in me ... a shout of mocking laughter went up." Nansen's enthusiasm for skiing was undiminished, though as he records, his efforts were overshadowed by those of the skiers from the mountainous region of Telemark, where a new style of skiing was being developed. "I saw this was the only way", wrote Nansen later.

At school, Nansen worked adequately without showing any particular aptitude. Studies took second place to sports, or to expeditions into the forests where he would live "like Robinson Crusoe" for weeks at a time. Through such experiences Nansen developed a marked degree of self-reliance. He became an accomplished skier and a highly proficient skater. Life was disrupted when, in the summer of 1877, Adelaide Nansen died suddenly. Distressed, Baldur Nansen sold the Store Frøen property and moved with his two sons to Christiania. Nansen's sporting prowess continued to develop; at 18 he broke the world one-mile (1.6 km) skating record, and in the following year won the national cross-country skiing championship, a feat he would repeat on 11 subsequent occasions.

== Student and adventurer ==
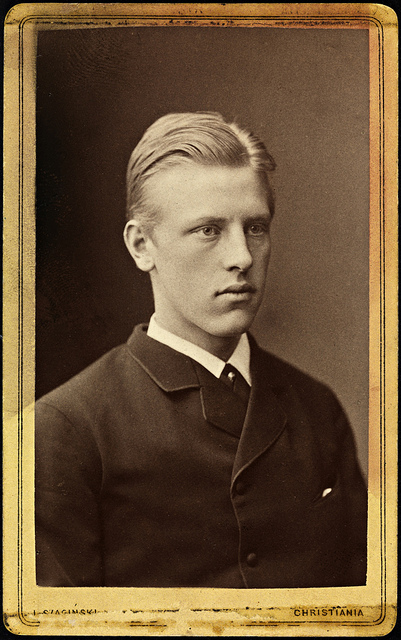
Nansen as a student in Christiania (1880, age 19)

In 1880 Nansen passed his university entrance examination, the examen artium. He decided to study zoology, claiming later that he chose the subject because he thought it offered the chance of a life in the open air. He began his studies at the Royal Frederick University in Christiania early in 1881.

Early in 1882 Nansen took "the first fatal step that led me astray from the quiet life of science." Professor Robert Collett of the university's zoology department proposed that Nansen take a sea voyage, to study Arctic zoology at first hand. Nansen was enthusiastic, and made arrangements through a recent acquaintance, Captain Axel Krefting, commander of the sealer Viking. The voyage began on 11 March 1882 and extended over the following five months. In the weeks before sealing started, Nansen was able to concentrate on scientific studies. From water samples he showed that, contrary to previous assumption, sea ice forms on the surface of the water rather than below. His readings also demonstrated that the Gulf Stream flows beneath a cold layer of surface water. Through the spring and early summer Viking roamed between Greenland and Spitsbergen in search of seal herds. Nansen became an expert marksman, and on one day proudly recorded that his team had shot 200 seals. In July, Viking became trapped in the ice close to an unexplored section of the Greenland coast; Nansen longed to go ashore, but this was impossible. However, he began to develop the idea that the Greenland icecap might be explored, or even crossed. On 17 July the ship broke free from the ice, and early in August was back in Norwegian waters.

Nansen did not resume formal studies at the university. Instead, on Collett's recommendation, he accepted a post as curator in the zoological department of the Bergen Museum. He was to spend the next six years of his life there—apart from a six-month sabbatical tour of Europe—working and studying with leading figures such as Gerhard Armauer Hansen, the discoverer of the leprosy bacillus, and Daniel Cornelius Danielssen, the museum's director who had turned it from a backwater collection into a centre of scientific research and education. Nansen's chosen area of study was the then relatively unexplored field of neuroanatomy, specifically the central nervous system of lower marine creatures. Before leaving for his sabbatical in February 1886 he published a paper summarising his research to date, in which he stated that "anastomoses or unions between the different ganglion cells" could not be demonstrated with certainty. This unorthodox view was confirmed by the simultaneous research of the embryologist Wilhelm His and the psychiatrist August Forel. Nansen is considered the first Norwegian defender of the neuron theory, originally proposed by Santiago Ramón y Cajal. His subsequent paper, The Structure and Combination of Histological Elements of the Central Nervous System, published in 1887, became his doctoral thesis.

== Crossing of Greenland ==
=== Planning ===
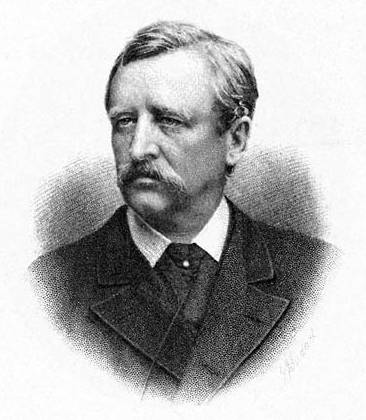
Adolf Erik Nordenskiöld, whose 1883 expedition had penetrated 160 kilometres (100 mi; 90 nmi) into the Greenland icecap

The idea of an expedition across the Greenland icecap grew in Nansen's mind throughout his Bergen years. In 1887, after the submission of his doctoral thesis, he finally began organising this project. Before then, the two most significant penetrations of the Greenland interior had been those of Adolf Erik Nordenskiöld in 1883, and Robert Peary in 1886. Both had set out from Disko Bay on the western coast, and had travelled about 160 kilometres (100 mi) eastward before turning back. By contrast, Nansen proposed to travel from east to west, ending rather than beginning his trek at Disko Bay. A party setting out from the inhabited west coast would, he reasoned, have to make a return trip, as no ship could be certain of reaching the dangerous east coast and picking them up. By starting from the east—assuming that a landing could be made there—Nansen's would be a one-way journey towards a populated area. The party would have no line of retreat to a safe base; the only way to go would be forward, a situation that fitted Nansen's philosophy completely.

Nansen rejected the complex organisation and heavy manpower of other Arctic ventures, and instead planned his expedition for a small party of six. Supplies would be manhauled on specially designed lightweight sledges. Much of the equipment, including sleeping bags, clothing and cooking stoves, also needed to be designed from scratch. These plans received a generally poor reception in the press; one critic had no doubt that "if [the] scheme be attempted in its present form ... the chances are ten to one that he will ... uselessly throw his own and perhaps others' lives away". The Norwegian parliament refused to provide financial support, believing that such a potentially risky undertaking should not be encouraged. The project was eventually launched with a donation from a Danish businessman, Augustin Gamél; the rest came mainly from small contributions from Nansen's countrymen, through a fundraising effort organised by students at the university.

Despite the adverse publicity, Nansen received numerous applications from would-be adventurers. He wanted expert skiers, and attempted to recruit from the skiers of the Telemark region, but his approaches were rebuffed. Nordenskiöld had advised Nansen that Sami people, from Finnmark in the far north of Norway, were expert snow travellers, so Nansen recruited a pair, Samuel Balto and Ole Nielsen Ravna. The remaining places went to Otto Sverdrup, a former sea-captain who had more recently worked as a forester; Oluf Christian Dietrichson, an army officer, and Kristian Kristiansen, an acquaintance of Sverdrup's. All had experience of outdoor life in extreme conditions, and were experienced skiers. Just before the party's departure, Nansen attended a formal examination at the university, which had agreed to receive his doctoral thesis. In accordance with custom, he was required to defend his work before appointed examiners acting as "devil's advocates". He left before knowing the outcome of this process.

=== Expedition ===
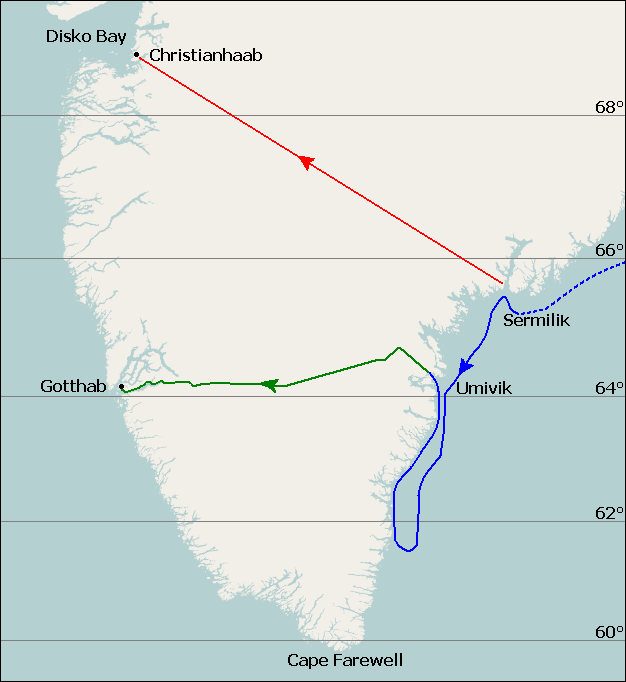
Greenland expedition, July–October 1888 Planned route from Sermilik to Christianhaab Approach and landing on 29 July Actual route to Godthaab, 15 August – 3 October

The sealer Jason picked up Nansen's party on 3 June 1888 from the Icelandic port of Ísafjörður. They sighted the Greenland coast a week later, but thick pack ice hindered progress. With the coast still 20 kilometres (12 mi) away, Nansen decided to launch the small boats. They were within sight of Sermilik Fjord on 17 July; Nansen believed it would offer a route up the icecap.

The expedition left Jason "in good spirits and with the highest hopes of a fortunate result." Days of extreme frustration followed as they drifted south. Weather and sea conditions prevented them from reaching the shore. They spent most time camping on the ice itself—it was too dangerous to launch the boats.

By 29 July, they found themselves 380 kilometres (240 mi) south of the point where they left the ship. That day they finally reached land but were too far south to begin the crossing. Nansen ordered the team back into the boats after a brief rest and to begin rowing north. The party battled northward along the coast through the ice floes for the next 12 days. They encountered a large Inuit encampment on the first day, near Cape Steen Bille. Occasional contacts with the nomadic native population continued as the journey progressed.

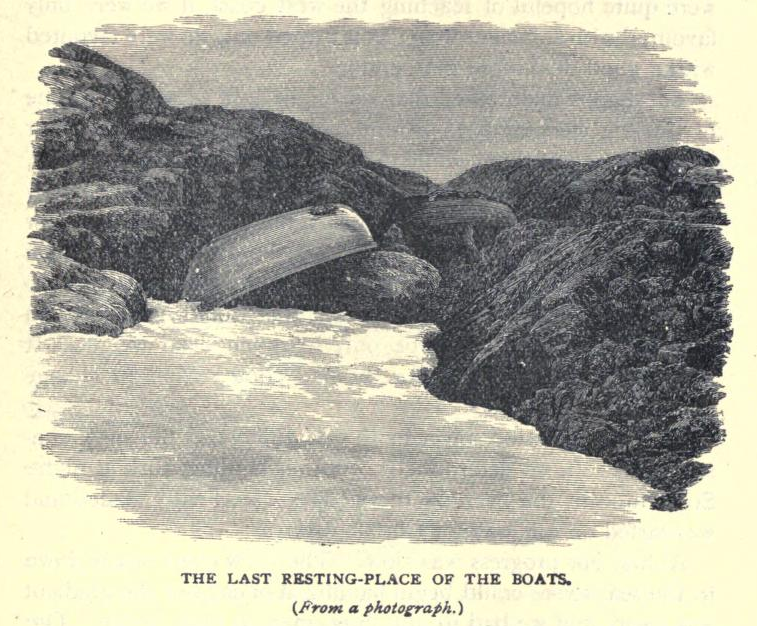
Boats and supplies were stored on Greenland's east coast.

The party reached Umivik Bay on 11 August, after covering 200 kilometres (120 mi). Nansen decided they needed to begin the crossing. Although they were still far south of his intended starting place, the season was becoming too advanced. After they landed at Umivik, they spent the next four days preparing for their journey. They set out on the evening of 15 August, heading north-west towards Christianhaab on the western shore of Disko Bay—600 kilometres (370 mi) away.

Over the next few days, the party struggled to ascend. The inland ice had a treacherous surface with many hidden crevasses and the weather was bad. Progress stopped for three days because of violent storms and continuous rain one time. The last ship was due to leave Christianhaab by mid-September. They would not be able to reach it in time, Nansen concluded on 26 August. He ordered a change of course due west, towards Godthaab, a shorter journey by at least 150 kilometres (93 mi). The rest of the party, according to Nansen, "hailed the change of plan with acclamation."

They continued climbing until 11 September and reached a height of 2,719 metres (8,921 ft) above sea level. Temperatures on the summit of the icecap dropped to −45 °C (−49 °F) at night. From then on, the downward slope made travelling easier. Yet, the terrain was rugged and the weather remained hostile. Progress was slow: fresh snowfalls made dragging the sledges like pulling them through sand.

On 26 September, they battled their way down the edge of a fjord westward towards Godthaab. Sverdrup constructed a makeshift boat out of parts of the sledges, willows, and their tent. Three days later, Nansen and Sverdrup began the last stage of the journey, rowing down the fjord.

On 3 October, they reached Godthaab, where the Danish town representative greeted them. He first informed Nansen that he had secured his doctorate, a matter that "could not have been more remote from [Nansen's] thoughts at that moment." The team accomplished their crossing in 49 days. Throughout the journey, they maintained meteorological and geographical and other records relating to the previously unexplored interior.

The rest of the team arrived in Godthaab on 12 October. Nansen soon learned no ship was likely to call at Godthaab until the following spring. Still, they were able to send letters back to Norway via a boat leaving Ivigtut at the end of October. He and his party spent the next seven months in Greenland. On 15 April 1889, the Danish ship Hvidbjørnen finally entered the harbour. Nansen recorded: "It was not without sorrow that we left this place and these people, among whom we had enjoyed ourselves so well."

== Interlude and marriage ==
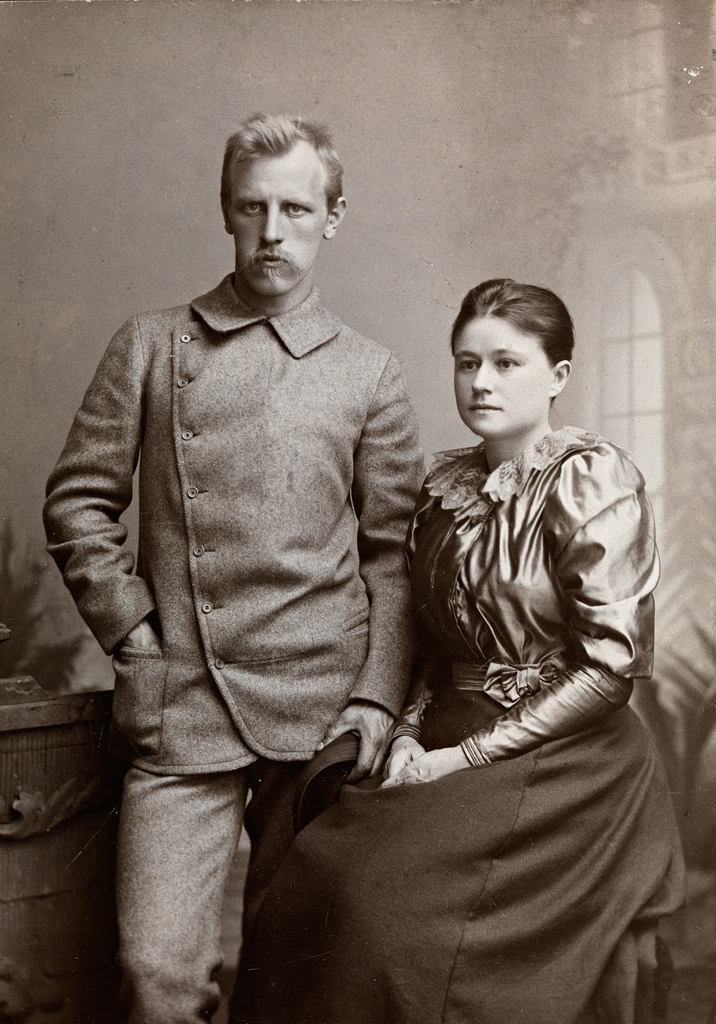
Fridtjof Nansen and Eva Nansen in autumn 1889

Hvidbjørnen reached Copenhagen on 21 May 1889. News of the crossing had preceded its arrival, and Nansen and his companions were feted as heroes. This welcome, however, was dwarfed by the reception in Christiania a week later, when crowds of between thirty and forty thousand—a third of the city's population—thronged the streets as the party made its way to the first of a series of receptions. The interest and enthusiasm generated by the expedition's achievement led directly to the formation that year of the Norwegian Geographical Society.

Nansen accepted the position of curator of the Royal Frederick University's zoology collection, a post which carried a salary but involved no duties; the university was satisfied by the association with the explorer's name. Nansen's main task in the following weeks was writing his account of the expedition, but he found time late in June to visit London, where he met the Prince of Wales (the future Edward VII), and addressed a meeting of the Royal Geographical Society (RGS).

The RGS president, Sir Mountstuart Elphinstone Grant Duff, said that Nansen had claimed "the foremost place amongst northern travellers", and later awarded him the Society's prestigious Patron's Medal. This was one of many honours Nansen received from institutions all over Europe. He was invited by a group of Australians to lead an expedition to Antarctica, but declined, believing that Norway's interests would be better served by a North Pole conquest.

On 11 August 1889 Nansen announced his engagement to Eva Sars, celebrated mezzo-soprano singer, a pioneer of women's skiing and the daughter of Michael Sars, a theologian and zoology professor who had died when Eva was 11 years old. The couple had met some years previously, at the skiing resort of Frognerseteren, where Nansen recalled seeing "two feet sticking out of the snow". Eva was three years older than Nansen, and despite the evidence of this first meeting, was an accomplished skier. She was also a celebrated classical singer who had been coached in Berlin by Désirée Artôt, one-time paramour of Tchaikovsky. The engagement surprised many; since Nansen had previously expressed himself forcefully against the institution of marriage, Otto Sverdrup assumed he had read the message wrongly. The wedding took place on 6 September 1889, less than a month after the engagement.

== Fram expedition ==
=== Planning ===
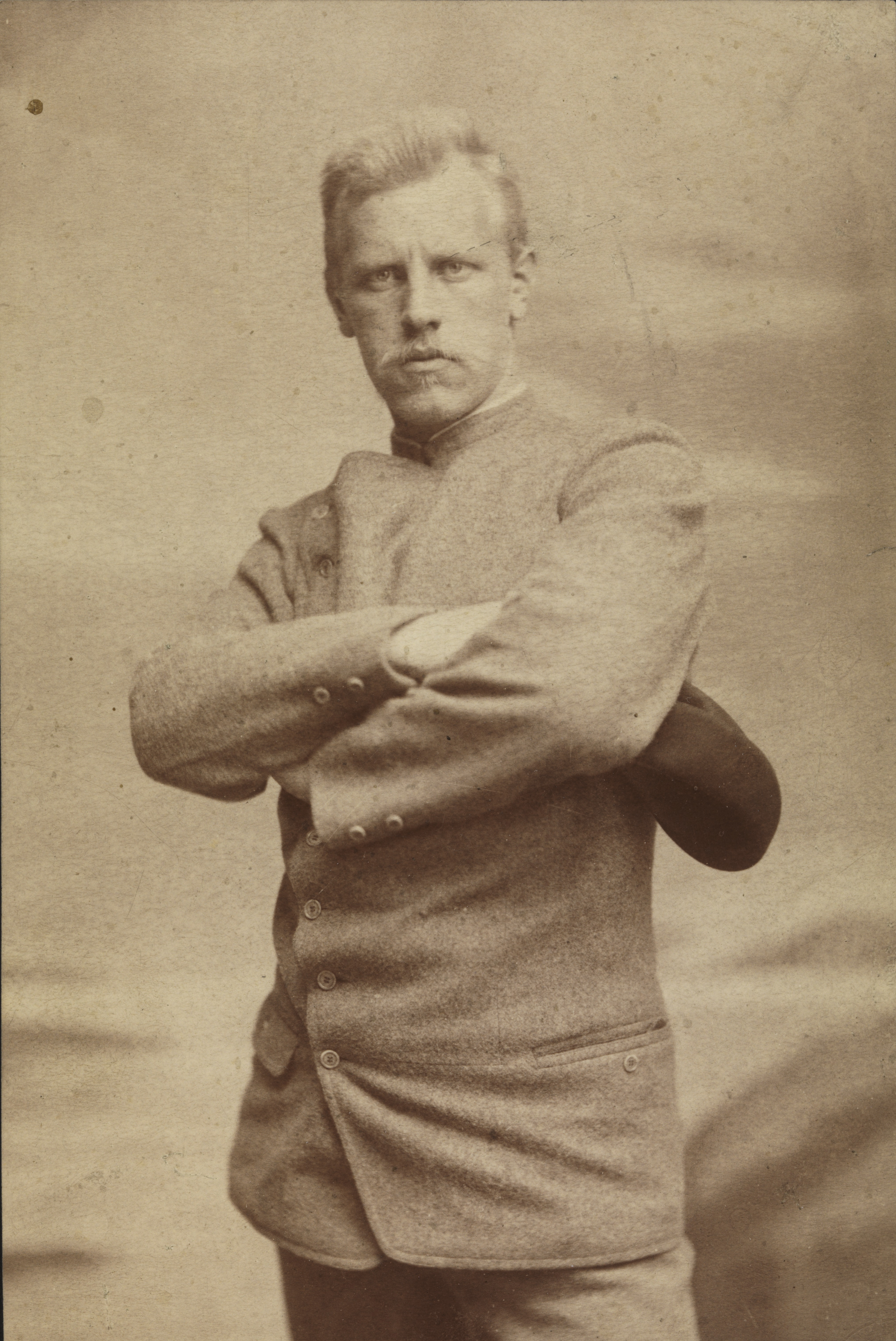
Nansen in 1889

Nansen first began to consider the possibility of reaching the North Pole after reading meteorologist Henrik Mohn's theory on transpolar drift in 1884. Artefacts found on the coast of Greenland were identified to have come from the Jeannette expedition. In June 1881, USS Jeannette was crushed and sunk off the Siberian coast—the opposite side of the Arctic Ocean. Mohn surmised the location of the artefacts indicated the existence of an ocean current from east to west, all the way across the polar sea and possibly over the pole itself.

The idea remained fixated in Nansen's mind for the next couple of years. He developed a detailed plan for a polar venture after his triumphant return from Greenland. He made his idea public in February 1890, at a meeting of the newly formed Norwegian Geographical Society. Previous expeditions, he argued, approached the North Pole from the west and failed because they were working against the prevailing east–west current; the secret was to work with the current.

A workable plan would require a sturdy and manoeuvrable small ship, capable of carrying fuel and provisions for twelve men for five years. This ship would enter the ice pack close to the approximate location of Jeannette's sinking, drifting west with the current towards the pole and beyond it—eventually reaching the sea between Greenland and Spitsbergen.

Experienced polar explorers were dismissive: Adolphus Greely called the idea "an illogical scheme of self-destruction". Equally dismissive were Sir Allen Young, a veteran of the searches for Franklin's lost expedition, and Sir Joseph Dalton Hooker, who had sailed to the Antarctic on the Ross expedition. Nansen still managed to secure a grant from the Norwegian parliament after an impassioned speech. Additional funding was secured through a national appeal for private donations.

=== Preparations ===
Nansen chose the Norwegian naval engineer Colin Archer to design and build a ship. Archer designed an extraordinarily sturdy vessel with an intricate system of crossbeams and braces of the toughest oak timbers. Its rounded hull was designed to push the ship upwards when beset by pack ice. Speed and manoeuvrability were to be secondary to its ability as a safe and warm shelter during their predicted confinement.

The length-to-beam ratio—39-metre-long (128 ft) and 11-metre-wide (36 ft)—gave it a stubby appearance, justified by Archer: "A ship that is built with exclusive regard to its suitability for [Nansen's] object must differ essentially from any known vessel." It was christened Fram and launched on 6 October 1892.

Nansen selected a party of twelve from thousands of applicants. Otto Sverdrup, who took part in Nansen's earlier Greenland expedition was appointed as the expedition's second-in-command. Competition was so fierce that army lieutenant and dog-driving expert Hjalmar Johansen signed on as ship's stoker, the only position still available.

=== Into the ice ===
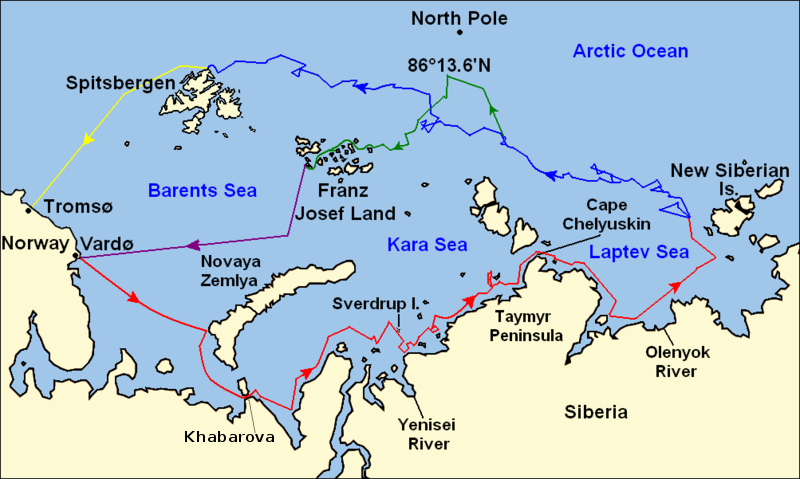
Expedition routes, July 1893 – August 1896: Fram's route into the pack ice, July–September 1893 Fram's three-year drift to Spitsbergen Nansen's marches, March 1895 – June 1896 Nansen's return to Vardø, August 1896 Fram's return to Tromsø, August 1896

Fram left Christiania on 24 June 1893, cheered on by thousands of well-wishers. After a slow journey around the coast, the final port of call was Vardø, in the far north-east of Norway. Fram left Vardø on 21 July, following the North-East Passage route pioneered by Nordenskiöld in 1878–1879, along the northern coast of Siberia. Progress was impeded by fog and ice conditions in the mainly uncharted seas.

The crew also experienced the dead water phenomenon, where a ship's forward progress is impeded by friction caused by a layer of fresh water lying on top of heavier salt water. Nevertheless, Cape Chelyuskin, the most northerly point of the Eurasian continental mass, was passed on 10 September.

Heavy pack ice was sighted ten days later at around latitude 78°N, as Fram approached the area in which USS Jeannette was crushed. Nansen followed the line of the pack northwards to a position recorded as 78°49′N 132°53′E, before ordering engines stopped and the rudder raised. From this point Fram's drift began. The first weeks in the ice were frustrating, as the drift moved unpredictably; sometimes north, sometimes south.

By 19 November, Fram's latitude was south of that at which she had entered the ice. Only after the turn of the year, in January 1894, did the northerly direction become generally settled; the 80°N mark was finally passed on 22 March. Nansen calculated that, at this rate, it might take the ship five years to reach the pole. As the ship's northerly progress continued at a rate rarely above a kilometre and a half per day, Nansen began privately to consider a new plan—a dog sledge journey towards the pole. With this in mind, he began to practice dog-driving, making many experimental journeys over the ice.

In November, Nansen announced his plan: when the ship passed latitude 83°N, he and Hjalmar Johansen would leave the ship with the dogs and make for the pole while Fram, under Sverdrup, continued its drift until it emerged from the ice in the North Atlantic. After reaching the pole, Nansen and Johansen would make for the nearest known land, the recently discovered and sketchily mapped Franz Josef Land. They would then cross to Spitzbergen where they would find a ship to take them home.

The crew spent the rest of the winter of 1894 preparing clothing and equipment for the forthcoming sledge journey. Kayaks were built, to be carried on the sledges until needed for the crossing of open water. Preparations were interrupted early in January when violent tremors shook the ship. The crew disembarked, fearing the vessel would be crushed, but Fram proved herself equal to the danger. On 8 January 1895, the ship's position was 83°34′N, above Greely's previous record of 83°24′N. (Note: Members of Greely's 1881–1884 expedition had achieved this latitude travelling north from Greenland. Of the original party of 25, only Greely and six others survived the expedition.)

=== Dash for the pole ===
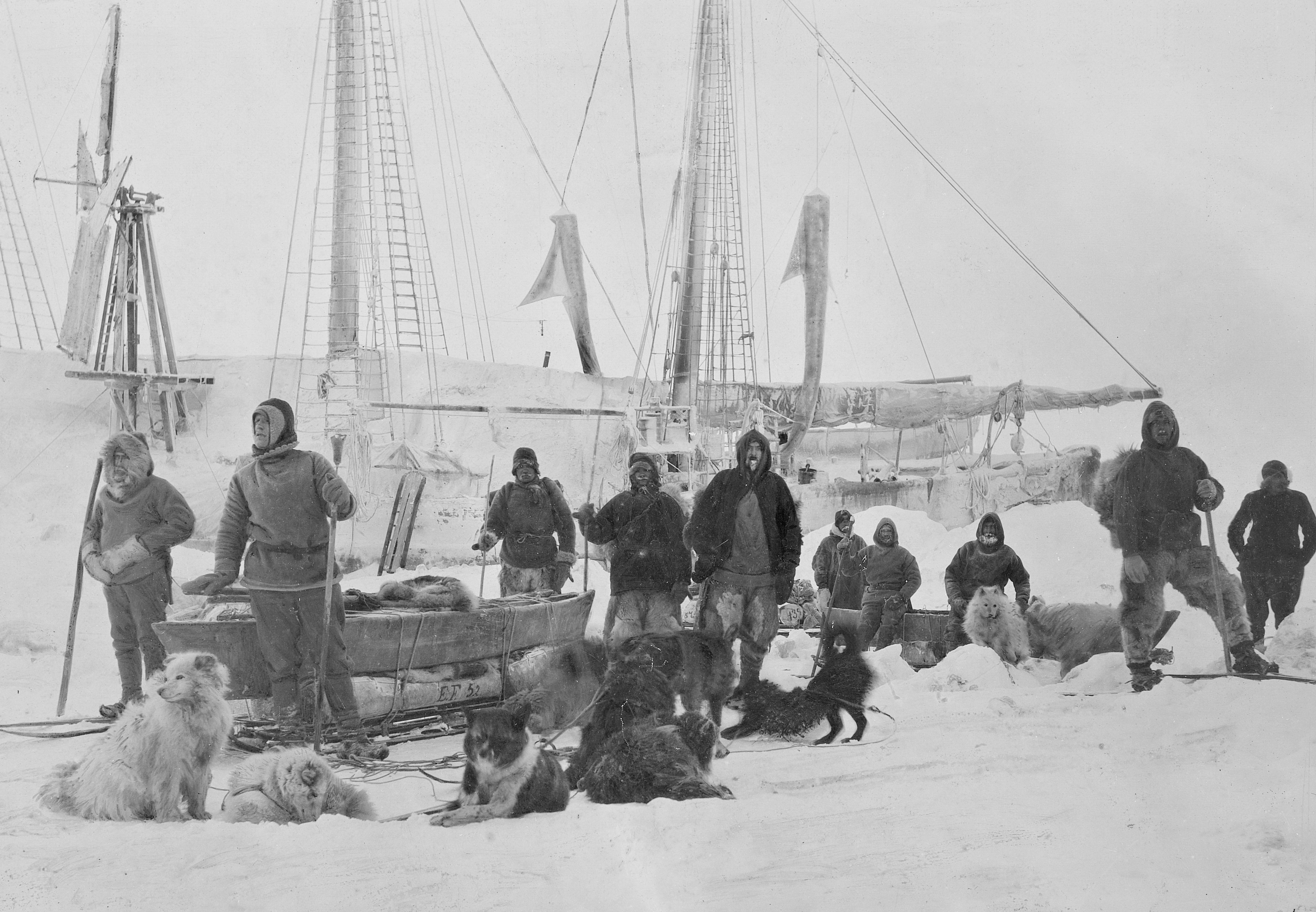
Preparations for Nansen and Johansen's polar trek, 14 March 1895

With the ship's latitude at 84°4′N and after two false starts, Nansen and Johansen began their journey on 14 March 1895. Nansen allowed 50 days to cover the 356 nautical miles (660 km; 410 mi) to the pole, an average daily journey of seven nautical miles (13 km; 8 mi). After a week of travel, a sextant observation indicated they averaged nine nautical miles (17 km; 10 mi) per day, which put them ahead of schedule. However, uneven surfaces made skiing more difficult, and their speeds slowed. They also realised they were marching against a southerly drift, and that distances travelled did not necessarily equate to distance progressed.

On 3 April, Nansen began to doubt whether the pole was attainable. Unless their speed improved, their food would not last them to the pole and back to Franz Josef Land. He confided in his diary: "I have become more and more convinced we ought to turn before time." Four days later, after making camp, he observed the way ahead was "... a veritable chaos of iceblocks stretching as far as the horizon." Nansen recorded their latitude as 86°13′6″N—almost three degrees beyond the previous record—and decided to turn around and head back south.

=== Retreat ===
At first Nansen and Johansen made good progress south, but suffered a serious setback on 13 April, when in his eagerness to break camp, they had forgotten to wind their chronometers, which made it impossible to calculate their longitude and accurately navigate to Franz Josef Land. They restarted the watches based on Nansen's guess they were at 86°E. From then on they were uncertain of their true position. The tracks of an Arctic fox were observed towards the end of April. It was the first trace of a living creature other than their dogs since they left Fram. They soon saw bear tracks and by the end of May saw evidence of nearby seals, gulls and whales.

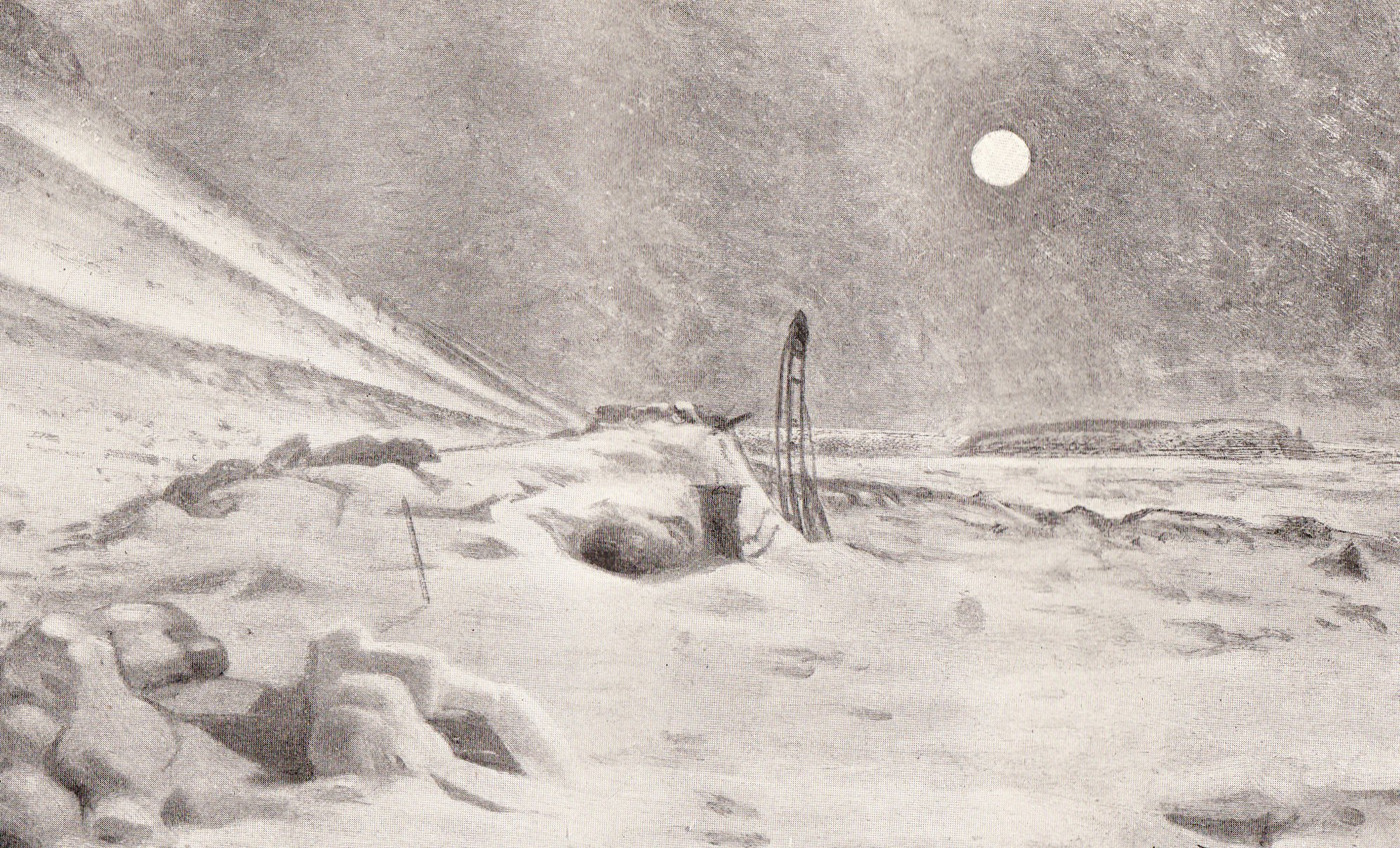
Nansen and Johansen's winter hut of 1895 on Franz Josef Land

On 31 May, Nansen calculated they were only 50 nautical miles (93 km; 58 mi) from Cape Fligely, Franz Josef Land's northernmost point. Travel conditions worsened as increasingly warmer weather caused the ice to break up. On 22 June, the pair decided to rest on a stable ice floe while they repaired their equipment and gathered strength for the next stage of their journey. They remained on the floe for a month.

The day after leaving this camp, Nansen recorded: "At last the marvel has come to pass—land, land, and after we had almost given up our belief in it!" Whether this still-distant land was Franz Josef Land or a new discovery they did not know—they had only a rough sketch map to guide them. (Note: The Franz Josef archipelago had been discovered in 1873 by Julius Payer, and was only partially explored and mapped at this stage.) The edge of the pack ice was reached on 6 August and they shot the last of their dogs—the weakest of which they had killed regularly to feed the others since 24 April. The two kayaks were lashed together, a sail was raised, and they made for the land.

It soon became clear this land was part of an archipelago. As they moved southwards, Nansen tentatively identified a headland as Cape Felder on the western edge of Franz Josef Land. Towards the end of August, as the weather grew colder and travel became increasingly difficult, Nansen decided to camp for the winter. In a sheltered cove, with stones and moss for building materials, the pair erected a hut which was to be their home for the next eight months. With ready supplies of bear, walrus and seal to keep their larder stocked, their principal enemy was not hunger but inactivity. After muted Christmas and New Year celebrations, in slowly improving weather, they began to prepare to leave their refuge, but it was 19 May 1896 before they were able to resume their journey.

=== Rescue and return ===
On 17 June, during a stop for repairs after the kayaks had been attacked by a walrus, Nansen thought he heard a dog barking as well as human voices. He went to investigate, and a few minutes later saw the figure of a man approaching. It was the British explorer Frederick Jackson, who was leading an expedition to Franz Josef Land and was camped at Cape Flora on nearby Northbrook Island. The two were equally astonished by their encounter; after some awkward hesitation Jackson asked: "You are Nansen, aren't you?", and received the reply "Yes, I am Nansen."

Johansen was picked up and the pair were taken to Cape Flora where, during the following weeks, they recuperated from their ordeal. Nansen later wrote that he could "still scarcely grasp" their sudden change of fortune; had it not been for the walrus attack that caused the delay, the two parties might have been unaware of each other's existence.

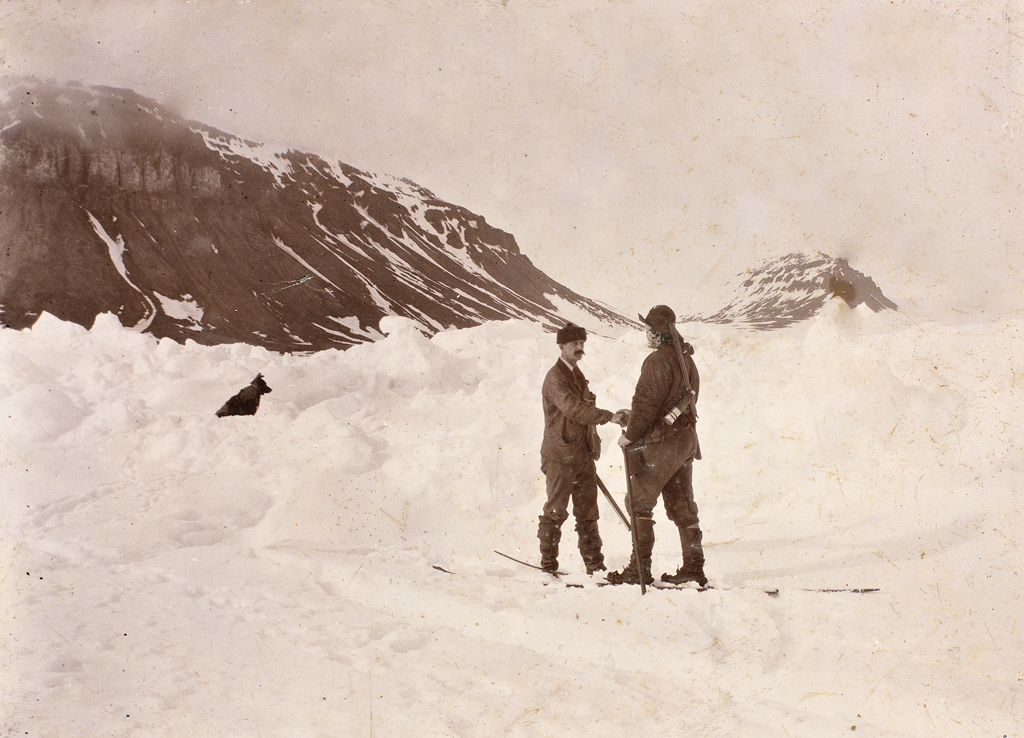
Staged photo of the Nansen–Jackson meeting near Cape Flora, 17 June 1896

On 7 August, Nansen and Johansen boarded Jackson's supply ship Windward, and sailed for Vardø where they arrived on the 13th. They were greeted by Hans Mohn, the originator of the polar drift theory, who was in the town by chance. The world was quickly informed by telegram of Nansen's safe return, but as yet there was no news of Fram.

Taking the weekly mail steamer south, Nansen and Johansen reached Hammerfest on 18 August, where they learned that Fram had been sighted. She had emerged from the ice north and west of Spitsbergen, as Nansen had predicted, and was now on her way to Tromsø. She had not passed over the pole, nor exceeded Nansen's northern mark. Without delay Nansen and Johansen sailed for Tromsø, where they were reunited with their comrades.

The homeward voyage to Christiania was a series of triumphant receptions at every port. On 9 September, Fram was escorted into Christiania's harbour and welcomed by the largest crowds the city had ever seen. The crew were received by King Oscar II, and Nansen, reunited with family, remained at the palace for several days as special guests. Tributes arrived from all over the world; typical was that from the British mountaineer Edward Whymper, who wrote that Nansen had made "almost as great an advance as has been accomplished by all other voyages in the nineteenth century put together".

== National figure ==
=== Scientist and polar oracle ===
Nansen's first task on his return was to write his account of the voyage. This he did remarkably quickly, producing 300,000 words of Norwegian text by November 1896; the English translation, titled Farthest North, was ready in January 1897. The book was an instant success, and secured Nansen's long-term financial future. Nansen included without comment the one significant adverse criticism of his conduct, that of Greely, who had written in Harper's Weekly on Nansen's decision to leave Fram and strike for the pole: "It passes comprehension how Nansen could have thus deviated from the most sacred duty devolving on the commander of a naval expedition."

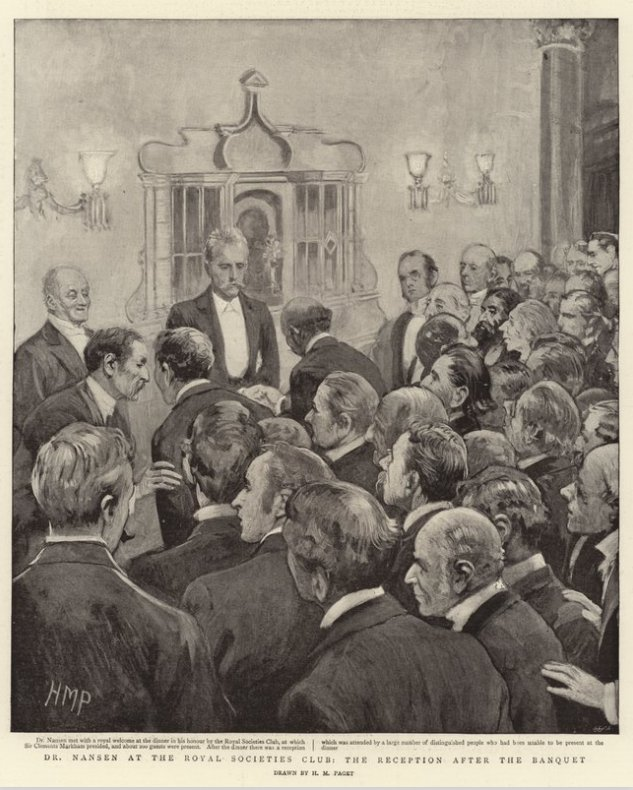
Nansen before the members of the Royal Societies Club in London in 1897 after a banquet held in his honour

During the 20 years following his return from the Arctic, Nansen devoted most of his energies to scientific work. In 1897 he accepted a professorship in zoology at the Royal Frederick University, which gave him a base from which he could tackle the major task of editing the reports of the scientific results of the Fram expedition. This was a much more arduous task than writing the expedition narrative. The results were eventually published in six volumes, and according to a later polar scientist, Robert Rudmose-Brown, "were to Arctic oceanography what the Challenger expedition results had been to the oceanography of other oceans."

In 1900, Nansen became director of the Christiania-based International Laboratory for North Sea Research, and helped found the International Council for the Exploration of the Sea. Through his connection with the latter body, in the summer of 1900 Nansen embarked on his first visit to Arctic waters since the Fram expedition, a cruise to Iceland and Jan Mayen Land on the oceanographic research vessel Michael Sars, named after Eva's father. Shortly after his return he learned that his Farthest North record had been passed, by members of the Duke of the Abruzzi's Italian expedition. They had reached 86°34′N on 24 April 1900, in an attempt to reach the North Pole from Franz Josef Land. Nansen received the news philosophically: "What is the value of having goals for their own sake? They all vanish ... it is merely a question of time."

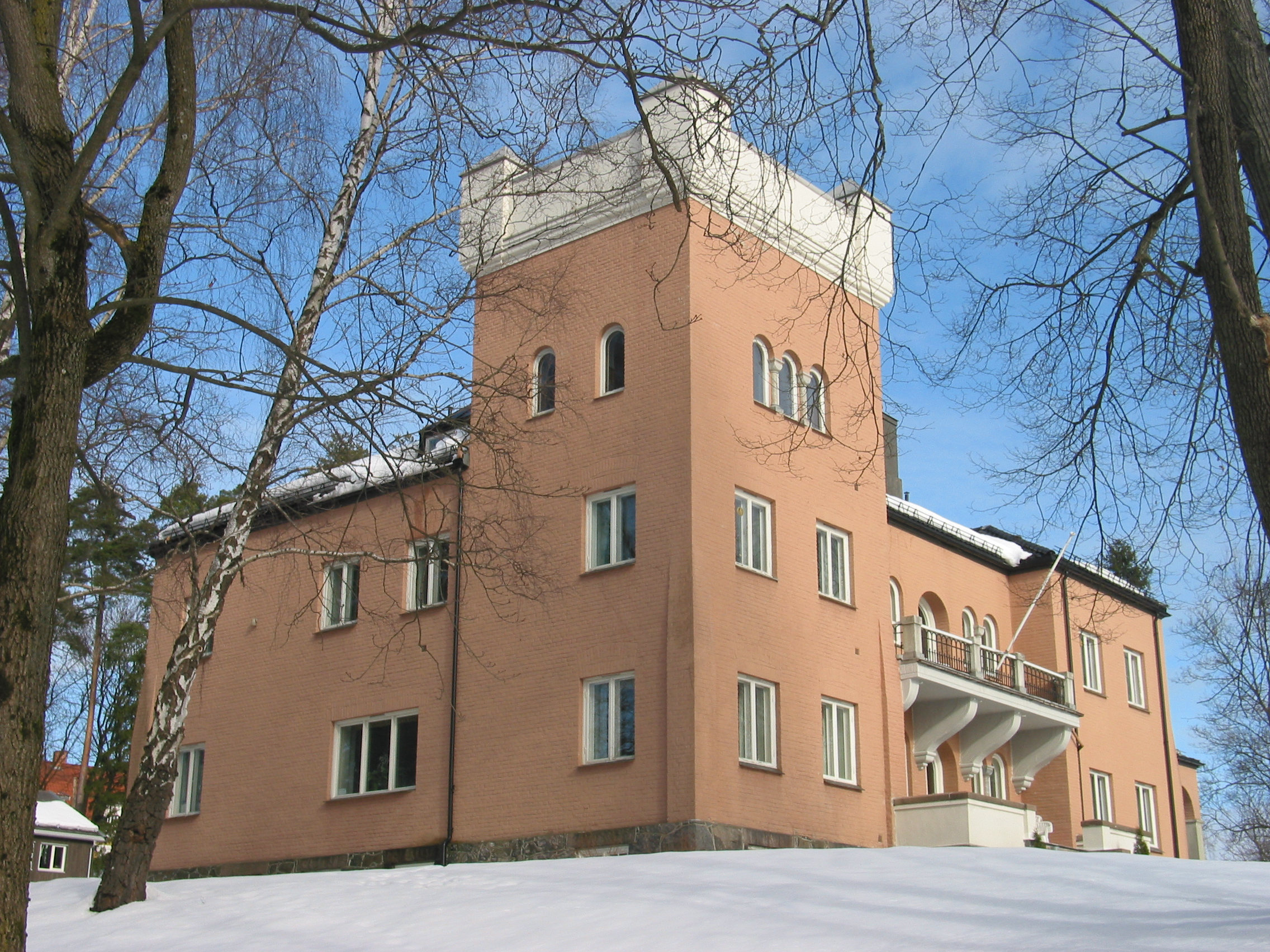
Fridtjof Nansen Institute at Polhøgda

Nansen was now considered an oracle by all would-be explorers of the north and south polar regions. Abruzzi had consulted him, as had the Belgian Adrien de Gerlache, each of whom took expeditions to the Antarctic. Although Nansen refused to meet his own countryman and fellow-explorer Carsten Borchgrevink (whom he considered a fraud), he gave advice to Robert Falcon Scott on polar equipment and transport, prior to the 1901–04 Discovery expedition. At one point Nansen seriously considered leading a South Pole expedition himself, and asked Colin Archer to design two ships. However, these plans remained on the drawing board.

By 1901 Nansen's family had expanded considerably. A daughter, Liv, had been born just before Fram set out; a son, Kåre was born in 1897 followed by a daughter, Irmelin, in 1900 and a second son Odd in 1901. The family home, which Nansen had built in 1891 from the profits of his Greenland expedition book, was now too small. Nansen acquired a plot of land in the Lysaker district and built, substantially to his own design, a large and imposing house which combined some of the characteristics of an English manor house with features from the Italian renaissance.

The house was ready for occupation by April 1902; Nansen called it Polhøgda (in English "polar heights"), and it remained his home for the rest of his life. A fifth and final child, son Asmund, was born at Polhøgda in 1903.

=== Politician and diplomat ===
The union between Norway and Sweden, imposed by the Great Powers in 1814, had been under considerable strain through the 1890s, the chief issue in question being Norway's rights to its own consular service. Nansen, although not by inclination a politician, had spoken out on the issue on several occasions in defence of Norway's interests. As of 1898 Nansen was among the contributors of Ringeren, an anti-Union magazine established by Sigurd Ibsen. It seemed, early in the 20th century that agreement between the two countries might be possible, but hopes were dashed when negotiations broke down in February 1905. The Norwegian government fell, and was replaced by one led by Christian Michelsen, whose programme was one of separation from Sweden.

In February and March Nansen published a series of newspaper articles which placed him firmly in the separatist camp. The new prime minister wanted Nansen in the cabinet, but Nansen had no political ambitions. However, at Michelsen's request he went to Berlin and then to London where, in a letter to The Times, he presented Norway's legal case for a separate consular service to the English-speaking world. On 17 May 1905, Norway's Constitution Day, Nansen addressed a large crowd in Christiania, saying: "Now have all ways of retreat been closed. Now remains only one path, the way forward, perhaps through difficulties and hardships, but forward for our country, to a free Norway". He also wrote a book, Norway and the Union with Sweden, to promote Norway's case abroad.

On 23 May the Storting passed the Consulate Act establishing a separate consular service. King Oscar refused his assent; on 27 May the Norwegian cabinet resigned, but the king would not recognise this step. On 7 June the Storting unilaterally announced that the union with Sweden was dissolved. In a tense situation the Swedish government agreed to Norway's request that the dissolution should be put to a referendum of the Norwegian people. This was held on 13 August 1905 and resulted in an overwhelming vote for independence, at which point King Oscar relinquished the crown of Norway while retaining the Swedish throne. A second referendum, held in November, determined that the new independent state should be a monarchy rather than a republic. In anticipation of this, Michelsen's government had been considering the suitability of various princes as candidates for the Norwegian throne. Faced with King Oscar's refusal to allow anyone from his own House of Bernadotte to accept the crown, the favoured choice was Prince Charles of Denmark. In July 1905 Michelsen sent Nansen to Copenhagen on a secret mission to persuade Charles to accept the Norwegian throne. Nansen was successful; shortly after the second referendum Charles was proclaimed king, taking the name Haakon VII. He and his wife, the British princess Maud, were crowned in the Nidaros Cathedral in Trondheim on 22 June 1906.

In April 1906 Nansen was appointed Norway's first Minister in London. His main task was to work with representatives of the major European powers on an Integrity Treaty which would guarantee Norway's position. Nansen was popular in England, and got on well with King Edward, though he found court functions and diplomatic duties disagreeable; "frivolous and boring" was his description. However, he was able to pursue his geographical and scientific interests through contacts with the Royal Geographical Society and other learned bodies. The Treaty was signed on 2 November 1907, and Nansen considered his task complete. Resisting the pleas of, among others, King Edward that he should remain in London, on 15 November Nansen resigned his post. A few weeks later, still in England as the king's guest at Sandringham, Nansen received word that Eva was seriously ill with pneumonia. On 8 December he set out for home, but before he reached Polhøgda he learned, from a telegram, that Eva had died.

=== Oceanographer and traveller ===
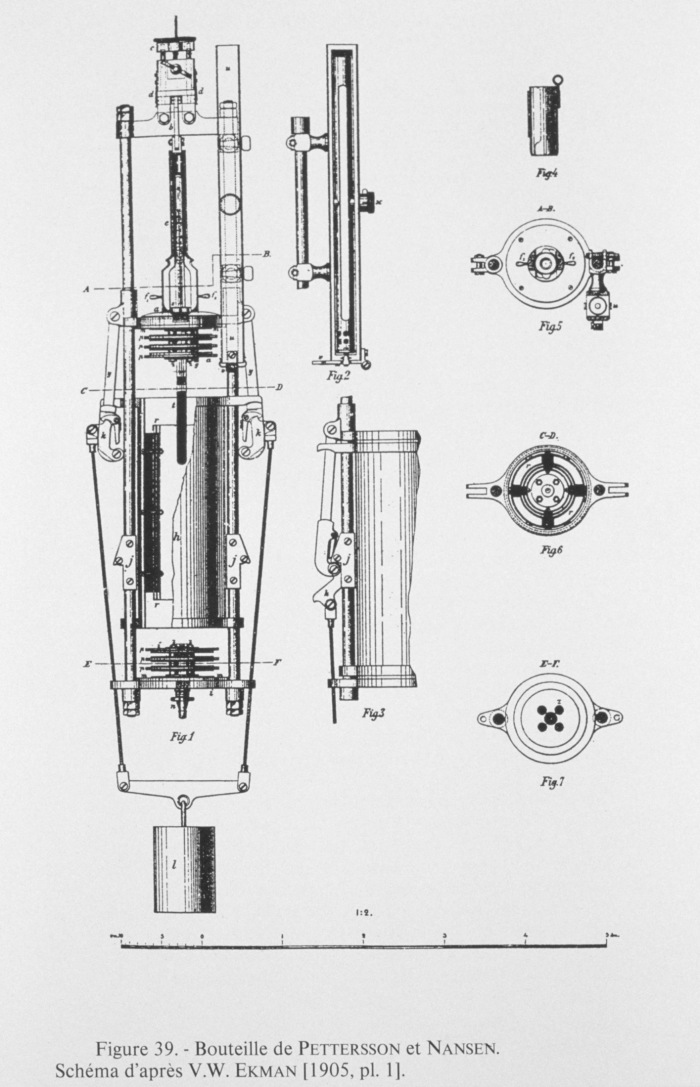
The Nansen bottle was used to sample seawater temperature at specific depths.

After a period of mourning, Nansen returned to London. He had been persuaded by his government to rescind his resignation until after King Edward's state visit to Norway in April 1908. His formal retirement from the diplomatic service was dated 1 May 1908, the same day on which his university professorship was changed from zoology to oceanography. This new designation reflected the general character of Nansen's more recent scientific interests.

In 1905, he had supplied the Swedish physicist Walfrid Ekman with the data which established the principle in oceanography known as the Ekman spiral. Based on Nansen's observations of ocean currents recorded during the Fram expedition, Ekman concluded that the effect of wind on the sea's surface produced currents which "formed something like a spiral staircase, down towards the depths".

In 1909 Nansen combined with Bjørn Helland-Hansen to publish an academic paper, The Norwegian Sea: its Physical Oceanography, based on the Michael Sars voyage of 1900. Nansen had by now retired from polar exploration, the decisive step being his release of Fram to fellow Norwegian Roald Amundsen, who was planning a North Pole expedition. When Amundsen made his controversial change of plan and set out for the South Pole, Nansen stood by him. (Note: Amundsen kept his South Pole intentions secret until Fram was beyond contact. He reached the South Pole on 14 December 1911, five weeks before Robert Falcon Scott, who died with his polar party on the return journey. In public Nansen praised Amundsen; in private, according to biographer Roland Huntford, he was "sick at heart".)

Between 1910 and 1914, Nansen participated in several oceanographic voyages. In 1910, aboard the Norwegian naval vessel Fridtjof, he carried out researches in the northern Atlantic, and in 1912 he took his own yacht, Veslemøy, to Bear Island and Spitsbergen. The main objective of the Veslemøy cruise was the investigation of salinity in the North Polar Basin. One of Nansen's lasting contributions to oceanography was his work designing instruments and equipment; the "Nansen bottle" for taking deep water samples remained in use into the 21st century, in a version updated by Shale Niskin.

At the request of the Royal Geographical Society, Nansen began work on a study of Arctic discoveries, which developed into a two-volume history of the exploration of the northern regions up to the beginning of the 16th century. This was published in 1911 as Nord i Tåkeheimen ("In Northern Mists"). That year he renewed an acquaintance with Kathleen Scott, wife of Robert Falcon Scott, whose Terra Nova Expedition had sailed for Antarctica in 1910.

Biographer Roland Huntford has claimed that Nansen and Kathleen Scott had a brief affair. Louisa Young, in her biography of Lady Scott, rejects the claim. Many women were attracted to Nansen, and he had a reputation as a womaniser. His personal life was troubled around this time; in January 1913 he received news of the suicide of Hjalmar Johansen, who had returned in disgrace from Amundsen's successful South Pole expedition. In March 1913, Nansen's youngest son Asmund died after a long illness.

In the summer of 1913, Nansen travelled to the Kara Sea, by the invitation of Jonas Lied, as part of a delegation investigating a possible trade route between Western Europe and the Siberian interior. The party then took a steamer up the Yenisei River to Krasnoyarsk, and travelled on the Trans-Siberian Railway to Vladivostok before turning for home. Nansen published a report from the trip in Through Siberia. The life and culture of the Russian peoples aroused in Nansen an interest and sympathy he would carry through to his later life. Immediately before the First World War, Nansen joined Helland-Hansen in an oceanographical cruise in eastern Atlantic waters.

=== Statesman and humanitarian ===
==== League of Nations ====
On the outbreak of war in 1914, Norway declared its neutrality, alongside Sweden and Denmark. Nansen was appointed as the president of the Norwegian Union of Defence, but had few official duties, and continued with his professional work as far as circumstances permitted. As the war progressed, the loss of Norway's overseas trade led to acute shortages of food in the country, which became critical in April 1917, when the United States entered the war and placed extra restrictions on international trade. Nansen was dispatched to Washington by the Norwegian government; after months of discussion, he secured food and other supplies in return for the introduction of a rationing system. When his government hesitated over the deal, he signed the agreement on his own initiative.

Within a few months of the war's end in November 1918, a draft agreement had been accepted by the Paris Peace Conference to create a League of Nations, as a means of resolving disputes between nations by peaceful means. The foundation of the League at this time was providential as far as Nansen was concerned, giving him a new outlet for his restless energy. He became president of the Norwegian League of Nations Society, and although the Scandinavian nations with their traditions of neutrality initially held themselves aloof, his advocacy helped to ensure that Norway became a full member of the League in 1920, and he became one of its three delegates to the League's General Assembly.

In April 1920, at the League's request, Nansen began organising the repatriation of around half a million prisoners of war, stranded in various parts of the world. Of these, 300,000 were in Russia which, gripped by revolution and civil war, had little interest in their fate. Nansen was able to report to the Assembly in November 1920 that around 200,000 men had been returned to their homes. "Never in my life", he said, "have I been brought into touch with so formidable an amount of suffering."

Nansen continued this work for a further two years until, in his final report to the Assembly in 1922, he was able to state that 427,886 prisoners had been repatriated to around 30 different countries. In paying tribute to his work, the responsible committee recorded that the story of his efforts "would contain tales of heroic endeavour worthy of those in the accounts of the crossing of Greenland and the great Arctic voyage."

=== Nansen Mission ===
The Nansen Mission is the colloquial term used by inhabitants of former Soviet Socialist Republics to describe the series of humanitarian initiatives undertaken by the International Committee of the Red Cross and headed by Fridtjof Nansen. This international effort included the involvement of the Swiss, Swedish, Dutch, Danish, Norwegian and German branches of the Red Cross, the Swiss and Italian Children's Aids, the Seventh-day Adventist Society, as well as many other organisations. The mobilisation effort began in August 1921 and the first programmes in Russia began soon after, with the signing of an agreement of assistance between Nansen and Georgy Chicherin, which provided aid to mitigate starvation in Russia and Ukraine.

==== Russian famine ====
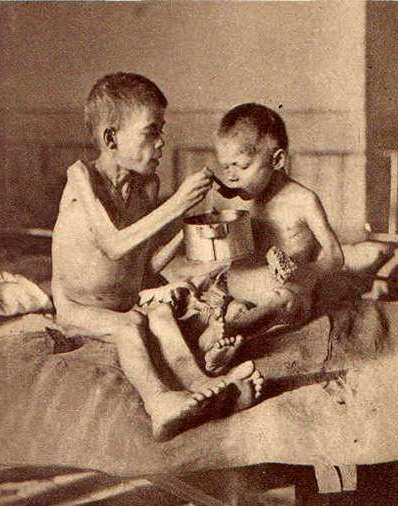
Nansen's photos on postcards were meant to raise awareness about the famine.

Even before this work was complete, Nansen was involved in a further humanitarian effort. On 1 September 1921, prompted by the British delegate Philip Noel-Baker, he accepted the post of the League's High Commissioner for Refugees. His main brief was the resettlement of around two million Russian refugees displaced by the upheavals of the Russian Revolution.

At the same time he tried to tackle the urgent problem of famine in Russia; following a widespread failure of crops around 30 million people were threatened with starvation and death. Despite Nansen's pleas on behalf of the starving, Russia's revolutionary government was feared and distrusted internationally, and the League was reluctant to come to its peoples' aid. Nansen had to rely largely on fundraising from private organisations, and his efforts met with limited success. Later he was to express himself bitterly on the matter:

"There was in various transatlantic countries such an abundance of maize, that the farmers had to burn it as fuel in their railway engines. At the same time, the ships in Europe were idle, for there were no cargoes. Simultaneously there were thousands, nay millions of unemployed. All this, while thirty million people in the Volga region—not far away and easily reached by our ships—were allowed to starve and die. The politicians of the world at large, except in the United States, were trying to find an excuse for doing nothing on the pretext that it was the Russians' own fault – a result of the Bolshevik system."

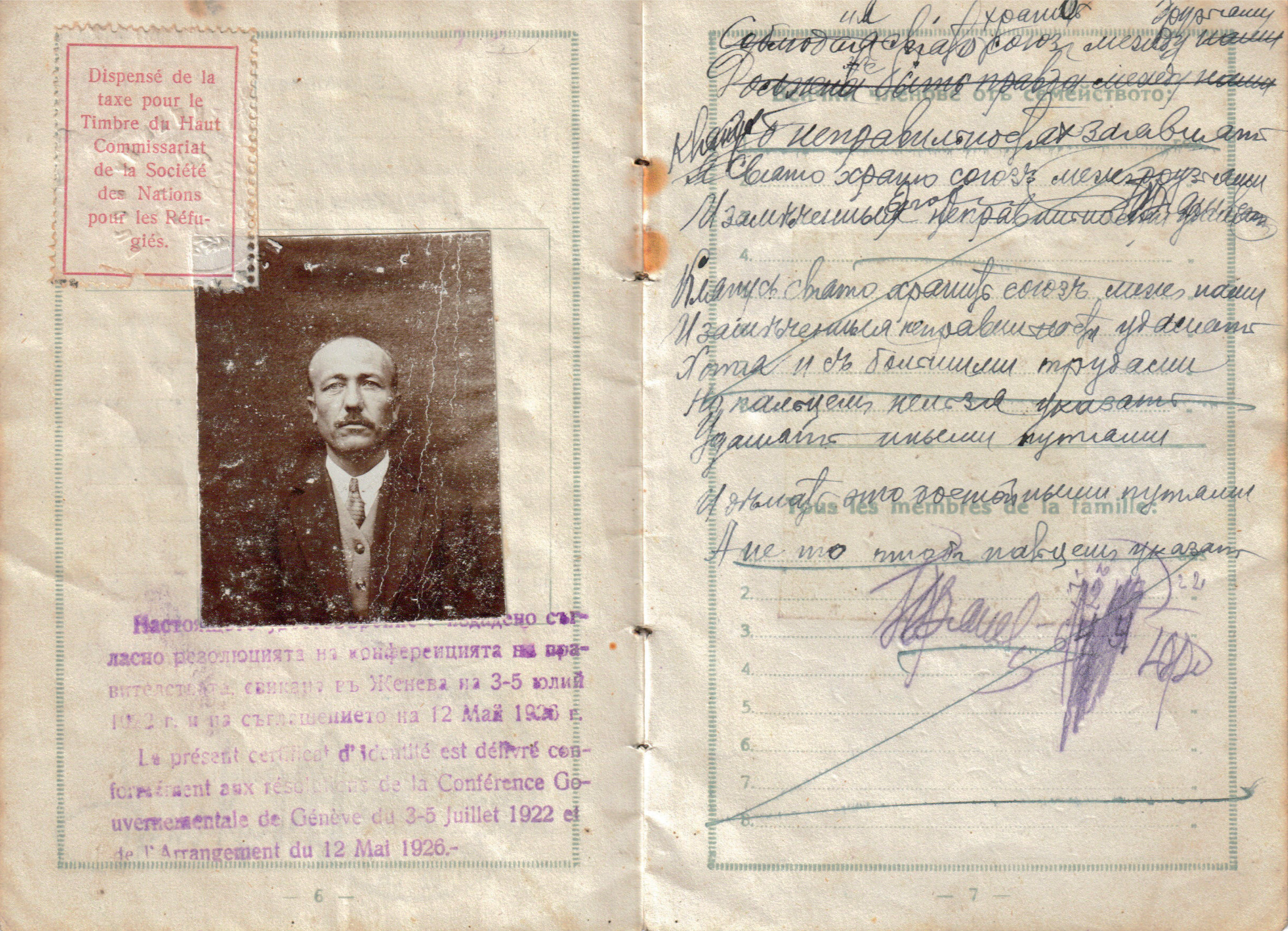
The Nansen passport allowed stateless persons to legally cross borders.

A major problem impeding Nansen's work on behalf of refugees was that most of them lacked documentary proof of identity or nationality. Without legal status in their country of refuge, their lack of papers meant they were unable to go anywhere else. To overcome this, Nansen devised a document that became known as the "Nansen passport", a form of identity for stateless persons that was in time recognised by more than 50 governments, and which allowed refugees to cross borders legally. Although the passport was created initially for refugees from Russia, it was extended to cover other groups.

While attending the Conference of Lausanne in November 1922, Nansen learned that he had been awarded the Nobel Peace Prize for 1922. The citation referred to "his work for the repatriation of the prisoners of war, his work for the Russian refugees, his work to bring succour to the millions of Russians afflicted by famine, and finally his present work for the refugees in Asia Minor and Thrace". Nansen donated the prize money to international relief efforts.

==== Greco-Turkish resettlement ====
After the Greco-Turkish War of 1919–1922, Nansen travelled to Constantinople to negotiate the resettlement of hundreds of thousands of refugees, mainly ethnic Greeks who had fled from Turkey after the defeat of the Greek Army. The impoverished Greek state was unable to take them in, and so Nansen devised a scheme for a population exchange whereby half a million Turks in Greece were returned to Turkey, with full financial compensation, while further loans facilitated the absorption of the refugee Greeks into their homeland. Despite some controversy over the principle of a population exchange, the plan was implemented successfully over a period of several years.

==== Armenian genocide ====
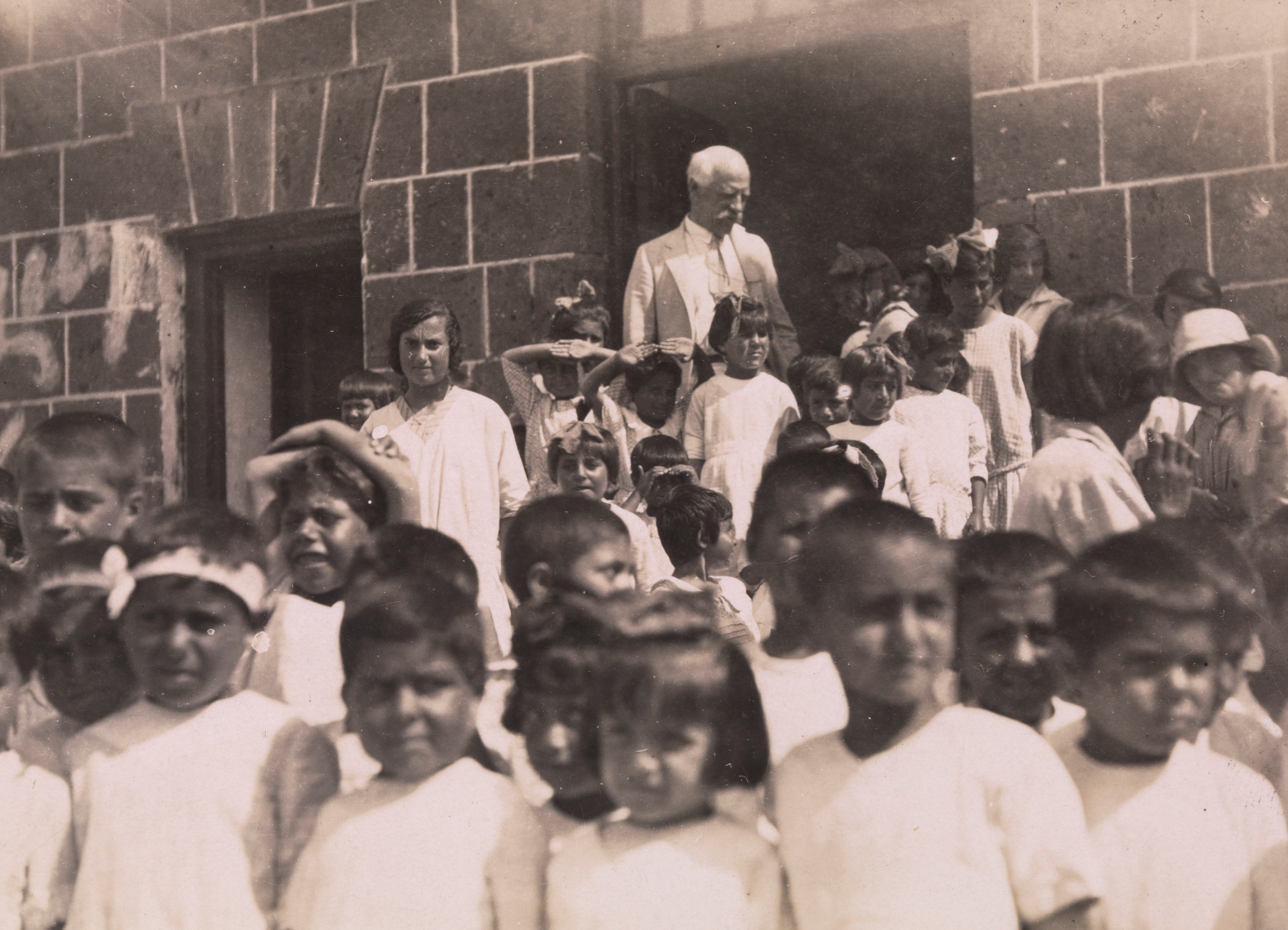
Nansen in front of an Armenian orphanage, 25 June 1925

From 1925 onwards, Nansen devoted much time trying to help Armenian refugees, victims of Armenian genocide at the hands of the Ottoman Empire during the First World War and further ill-treatment thereafter. His goal was the establishment of a national home for these refugees, within the borders of Soviet Armenia. His main assistant in this endeavour was Vidkun Quisling, the future Nazi collaborator and head of a Norwegian puppet government during the Second World War.

After visiting the region, Nansen presented the Assembly with a modest plan for the irrigation of 360 square kilometres (140 sq mi) on which 15,000 refugees could be settled. The plan ultimately failed, because even with Nansen's unremitting advocacy the money to finance the scheme was not forthcoming. Despite this failure, his reputation among the Armenian people remains high.

Nansen wrote Armenia and the Near East (1923) wherein he describes the plight of the Armenians in the wake of losing its independence to the Soviet Union. The book was translated into many languages. After his visit to Armenia, Nansen wrote two additional books: Across Armenia (1927) and Through the Caucasus to the Volga (1930).

Within the League's Assembly, Nansen spoke out on many issues besides those related to refugees. He believed that the Assembly gave the smaller countries such as Norway a "unique opportunity for speaking in the councils of the world." He believed that the extent of the League's success in reducing armaments would be the greatest test of its credibility. He was a signatory to the Slavery Convention of 25 September 1926, which sought to outlaw the use of forced labour. He supported a settlement of the post-war reparations issue and championed Germany's membership of the League, which was granted in September 1926 after intensive preparatory work by Nansen.

== Later life ==
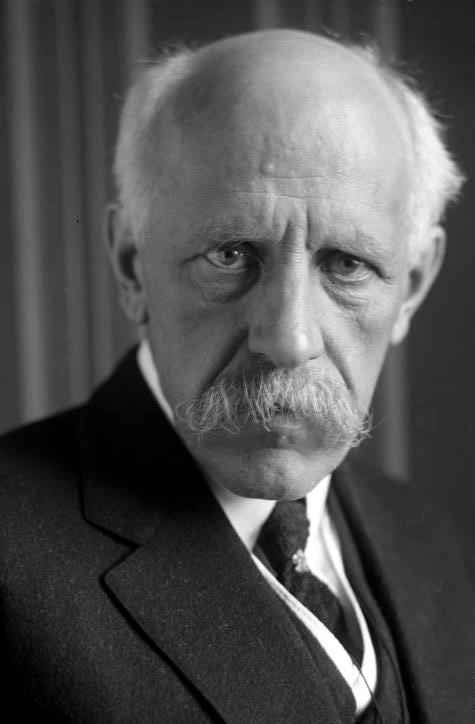
Nansen, photographed toward the end of his life (1930)

On 17 January 1919 Nansen married Sigrun Munthe, a long-time friend with whom he had had a love affair in 1905, while Eva was still alive. The marriage was resented by the Nansen children, and proved unhappy; an acquaintance writing of them in the 1920s said Nansen appeared unbearably miserable and Sigrun steeped in hate.

Nansen's League of Nations commitments through the 1920s meant that he was mostly absent from Norway, and was able to devote little time to scientific work. Nevertheless, he continued to publish occasional papers. He entertained the hope that he might travel to the North Pole by airship, but could not raise sufficient funding. In any event he was forestalled in this ambition by Amundsen, who flew over the pole in Umberto Nobile's airship Norge in May 1926. Two years later Nansen broadcast a memorial oration to Amundsen, who had disappeared in the Arctic while organising a rescue party for Nobile whose airship had crashed during a second polar voyage. Nansen said of Amundsen: "He found an unknown grave under the clear sky of the icy world, with the whirring of the wings of eternity through space."

In 1926 Nansen was elected Rector of the University of St Andrews in Scotland, the first foreigner to hold this largely honorary position. He used the occasion of his inaugural address to review his life and philosophy, and to deliver a call to the youth of the next generation. He ended:

We all have a Land of Beyond to seek in our life—what more can we ask? Our part is to find the trail that leads to it. A long trail, a hard trail, maybe; but the call comes to us, and we have to go. Rooted deep in the nature of every one of us is the spirit of adventure, the call of the wild—vibrating under all our actions, making life deeper and higher and nobler.

Nansen largely avoided involvement in domestic Norwegian politics, but in 1924 he was persuaded by the long-retired former Prime Minister Christian Michelsen to take part in a new anti-communist political grouping, the Fatherland League. There were fears in Norway that should the Marxist-oriented Labour Party gain power it would introduce a revolutionary programme. At the inaugural rally of the League in Oslo (as Christiania had now been renamed), Nansen declared: "To talk of the right of revolution in a society with full civil liberty, universal suffrage, equal treatment for everyone ... [is] idiotic nonsense."

Following continued turmoil between the centre-right parties, there was even an independent petition in 1926 gaining some momentum that proposed for Nansen to head a centre-right national unity government on a balanced budget program, an idea he did not reject. He was the headline speaker at the single largest Fatherland League rally with 15,000 attendees in Tønsberg in 1928. In 1929 he went on his final tour for the League on the ship Stella Polaris, holding speeches from Bergen to Hammerfest.

In between his various duties and responsibilities, Nansen had continued to take skiing holidays when he could. In February 1930, aged 68, he took a short break in the mountains with two old friends, who noted that Nansen was slower than usual and appeared to tire easily. On his return to Oslo he was laid up for several months, with influenza and later phlebitis, and was visited on his sickbed by King Haakon VII. Nansen was an atheist.

== Death and legacy ==
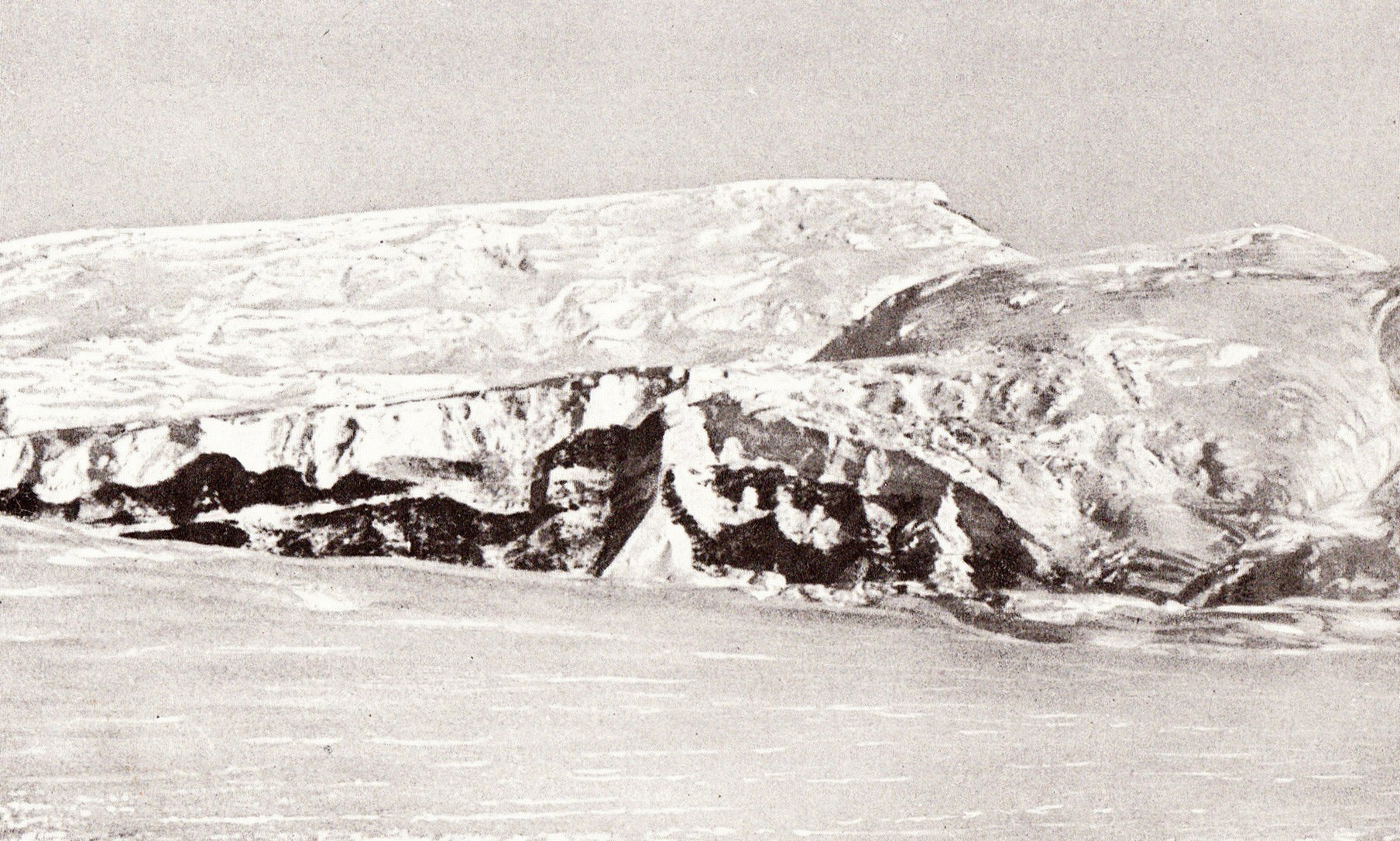
Mount Fridtjof Nansen in Antarctica, named and photographed by Roald Amundsen

Nansen died of a heart attack on 13 May 1930. He was given a non-religious state funeral before cremation, after which his ashes were laid under a tree at Polhøgda. Nansen's daughter Liv recorded that there were no speeches, just music: Schubert's Death and the Maiden, which Eva used to sing.

In his lifetime and thereafter, Nansen received honours and recognition from many countries. Among the many tributes paid to him subsequently was that of Lord Robert Cecil, a fellow League of Nations delegate, who spoke of the range of Nansen's work, done with no regard for his own interests or health: "Every good cause had his support. He was a fearless peacemaker, a friend of justice, an advocate always for the weak and suffering."

Nansen was a pioneer and innovator in many fields. As a young man he embraced the revolution in skiing methods that transformed it from a means of winter travel to a universal sport, and quickly became one of Norway's leading skiers. He was later able to apply this expertise to the problems of polar travel, in both his Greenland and his Fram expeditions.

He invented the "Nansen sledge" with broad, ski-like runners, the "Nansen cooker" to improve the heat efficiency of the standard spirit stoves then in use, and the layer principle in polar clothing, whereby the traditionally heavy, awkward garments were replaced by layers of lightweight material. In science, Nansen is recognised both as one of the founders of modern neurology, and as a significant contributor to early oceanographical science, in particular for his work in establishing the Central Oceanographic Laboratory in Christiania.

Through his work on behalf of the League of Nations, Nansen helped to establish the principle of international responsibility for refugees. Immediately after his death the League set up the Nansen International Office for Refugees, a semi-autonomous body under the League's authority, to continue his work. The Nansen Office faced great difficulties, in part arising from the large numbers of refugees from the European dictatorships during the 1930s. Nevertheless, it secured the agreement of 14 countries (including a reluctant Great Britain) to the Refugee Convention of 1933.

It also helped to repatriate 10,000 Armenians to Yerevan in Soviet Armenia, and to find homes for a further 40,000 in Syria and Lebanon. In 1938, the year in which it was superseded by a wider-ranging body, the Nansen Office was awarded the Nobel Peace Prize. In 1954, the League's successor body, the United Nations, established the Nansen Medal, later named the Nansen Refugee Award, given annually by the United Nations High Commissioner for Refugees to an individual, group or organisation "for outstanding work on behalf of the forcibly displaced".

Numerous geographical features bear his name: the Nansen Basin and the Nansen-Gakkel Ridge in the Arctic Ocean; Mount Nansen in the Yukon region of Canada; Mount Nansen, Mount Fridtjof Nansen and Nansen Island, all in Antarctica; as well as Nansen Island in the Kara Sea, Nansen Land in Greenland and Nansen Island in Franz Josef Land; 853 Nansenia, an asteroid; Nansen crater at the Moon's north pole and Nansen crater on Mars. His Polhøgda mansion is now home to the Fridtjof Nansen Institute, an independent foundation which engages in research on environmental, energy and resource management politics.

A 1968 Norwegian/Soviet biographical film Just a Life: the Story of Fridtjof Nansen was released with Knut Wigert as Nansen.

In the 1948 film Scott of the Antarctic, Nansen was played by Stig Egede-Nissen. In the 1985 television serial The Last Place on Earth, he was portrayed by Max von Sydow. In the 2019 film Amundsen, Trond Espen Seim appeared as Nansen.

The Royal Norwegian Navy launched the first of a series of five Fridtjof Nansen-class frigates in 2004, with HNoMS Fridtjof Nansen as its lead ship. Cruise ship MS Fridtjof Nansen was launched in 2020.

== Orders and decorations ==
- Norway:
  - Knight of the Royal Norwegian Order of Saint Olav, 25 May 1889; Grand Cross, 11 September 1896; with Collar, 7 September 1925
  - Fram Medal, 1896
  - Coronation Medal of King Haakon VII and Queen Maud, 1st Class (Silver), 1906
- Sweden: Vega Medal, 1889
- Austria-Hungary: Grand Cross of the Imperial Austrian Order of Franz Joseph, 1898
- Kingdom of Bavaria: Grand Cross of the Merit Order of Saint Michael
- Denmark:
  - Medal of Merit, in Gold and with Crown, 1897
  - Knight of the Order of the Dannebrog, 24 May 1889
- France:
  - Grand Gold Medal of Exploration and Journeys of Discovery, 1897
  - Commander of the National Order of the Legion of Honour
- Kingdom of Italy:
  - Grand Officer of the Order of Saints Maurice and Lazarus
  - Grand Cross of the Order of the Crown of Italy
- Kingdom of Prussia:
  - Carl-Ritter Medal (Silver), 1889
  - 1878 Alexander von Humboldt Medal (Gold), 1897
- Russian Empire:
  - Constantine Medal, 1907
  - Knight of the Imperial Order of Saint Stanislaus, 1st Class
- United Kingdom:
  - Patron's Medal, 1891
  - Honorary Knight Grand Cross of the Royal Victorian Order, 13 November 1906
- United States: Cullum Geographical Medal, 1897

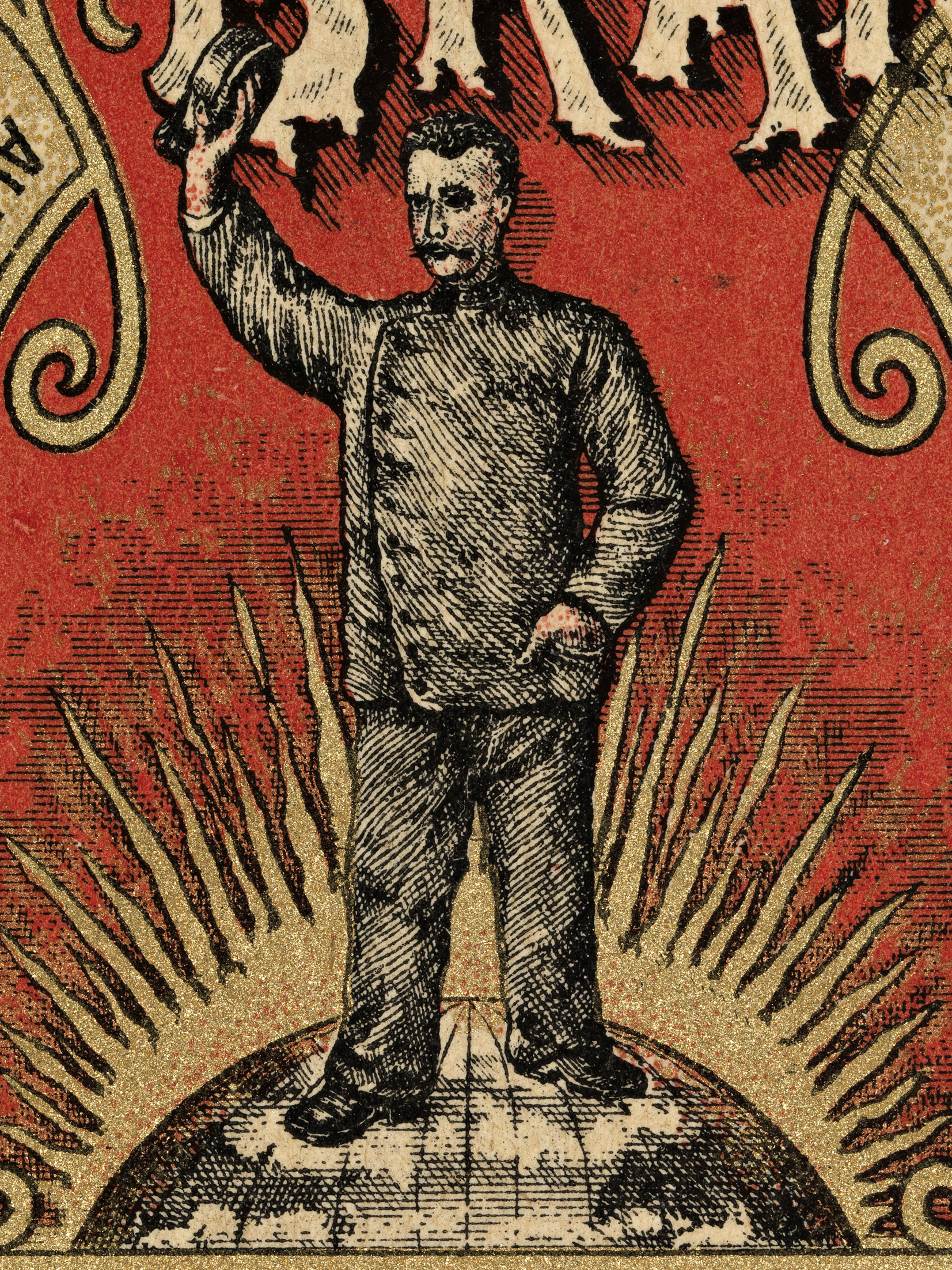
1896 Fridtjof Nansen in lithograph art from canned sardines label

== Works ==
- Paa ski over Grønland. En skildring af Den norske Grønlands-ekspedition 1888–89. Aschehoug, Kristiania 1890. Tr. as The First Crossing of Greenland, 1890. (Reviewed in The Scientific Results of Dr. Nansen’s Expedition by James Geikie The Scottish Geographical Magazine, 1891).
- Eskimoliv. Aschehoug, Kristiania 1891. Tr. as Eskimo Life, (London: Longmans, Green & Co., 1893).
- Fram over Polhavet. Den norske polarfærd 1893–1896. Aschehoug, Kristiania 1897. Tr. as Farthest North, 1897.
- The Norwegian North Polar Expedition, 1893–1896; Scientific Results (6 volumes, 1901).
- Norge og foreningen med Sverige. Jacob Dybwads Forlag, Kristiania 1905. Tr. as Norway and the Union With Sweden, 1905.
- Northern Waters: Captain Roald Amundsen's Oceanographic Observations in the Arctic Seas in 1901. Jacob Dybwads Forlag, Kristiania, 1906.
- Nord i tåkeheimen. Utforskningen av jordens nordlige strøk i tidlige tider. Jacob Dybwads Forlag, Kristiania 1911. Tr. as In Northern Mists: Arctic Exploration in Early Times, 1911.
- Gjennem Sibirien. Jacob Dybwads forlag, Kristiania, 1914. Tr. as Through Siberia the Land of the Future, 1914.
- Frilufts-liv. Jacob Dybwads Forlag, Kristiania, 1916.
- En ferd til Spitsbergen. Jacob Dybwads Forlag, Kristiania, 1920.
- Rusland og freden. Jacob Dybwads Forlag, Kristiania, 1923.
- Blant sel og bjørn. Min første Ishavs-ferd. Jacob Dybwads Forlag, Kristiania, 1924.
- Gjennem Armenia. Jacob Dybwads Forlag, Oslo, 1927.
- Gjennem Kaukasus til Volga. Jacob Dybwads Forlag, Oslo, 1929. Tr. as Through The Caucasus To The Volga, 1931.

English translations

- Through Siberia, the Land of the Future. London: William Heinemann. 1914.
- Armenia and the Near East. Publisher: J.C. & A.L. Fawcett, Inc., New York, 1928.

== See also ==
- Bibliography of the Russian Revolution and Civil War
- Outline of the Russian Revolution and Civil War
- Index of articles related to the Russian Revolution and Civil War
- Arctic exploration
- List of polar explorers
- Nansen Ski Club
- Nansen Ski Jump
- Fridtjof Nansen Prize for Outstanding Research
- Fridtjof Nansen Peninsula

== Notes ==
Academic offices
Preceded by Rudyard Kipling	Rector of the University of St Andrews; 1928–1931	Succeeded by Sir Wilfred Grenfell
