= Steinkjerelva =

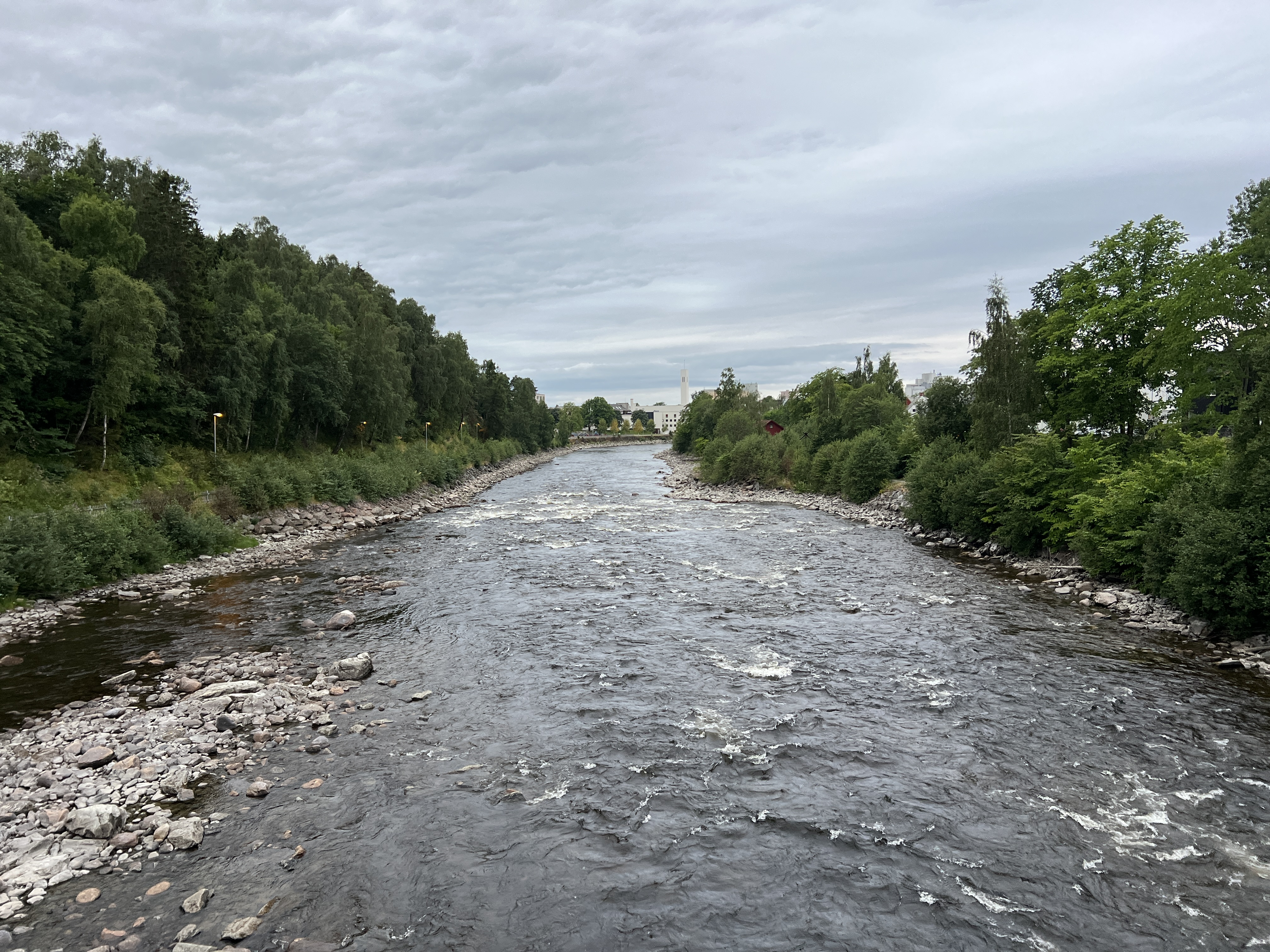
- Interactive map of the river

Location
- Country: Norway
- County: Trøndelag
- Municipality: Steinkjer Municipality

Physical characteristics
- Source: Confluence of the rivers Byelva and Ogna
  - location: Steinkjer, Norway
  - coordinates: 64.02258°N 11.50307°E
  - elevation: 10 metres (33 ft)
- Mouth: Beitstadfjorden
  - location: Steinkjer, Norway
  - coordinates: 64.01233°N 11.4825°E
  - elevation: 0 metres (0 ft)
- Length: 2.2 km (1.4 mi)
- Basin size: 2,143 km^{2} (827 sq mi)

Basin features
- River system: Snåsavatnet
- Bridges: Sneppen Bridge

Steinkjerelva is a 2.2-kilometer (1.4 mi) long river in the town of Steinkjer in Steinkjer Municipality in Trøndelag county, Norway. It forms at the confluence between the rivers Byaelva and Ogna at Guldbergaunet and flows through the town of Steinkjer before flowing into Beitstadfjorden, the inner part of the Trondheimsfjord. The river is crossed by four bridges, including one for the Nordland Line and the Sneppen Bridge which is part of the European route E6 highway. The river drains the entire Snåsavatnet watershed, which covers an area of 2,143 square kilometers (827 sq mi).

== See also ==
- List of rivers in Norway
