= Kristian Kristiansen (explorer) =

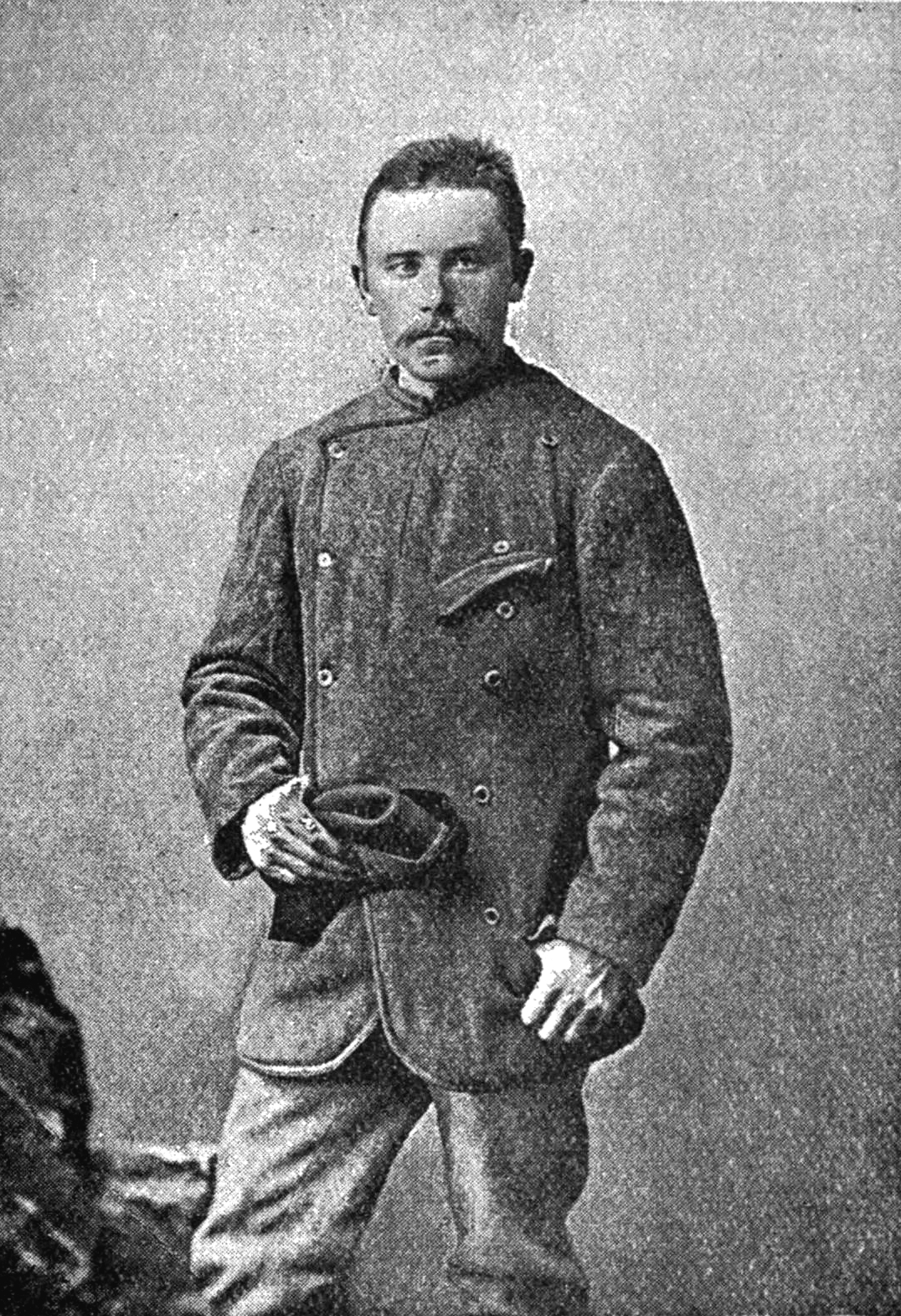
- Kristian Kristiansen (1890)
- Born: 16 February 1865; Steinkjer, Norway
- Died: 30 June 1943 (aged 78); Steinkjer, Norway
- Known for: Greenland expedition 1888

Kristian Kristiansen (16 February 1865 - 30 June 1943) was a Norwegian explorer who participated in the Greenland expedition of 1888 arranged by Fridtjof Nansen. This was the first documented crossing of Greenland.

== Biography ==
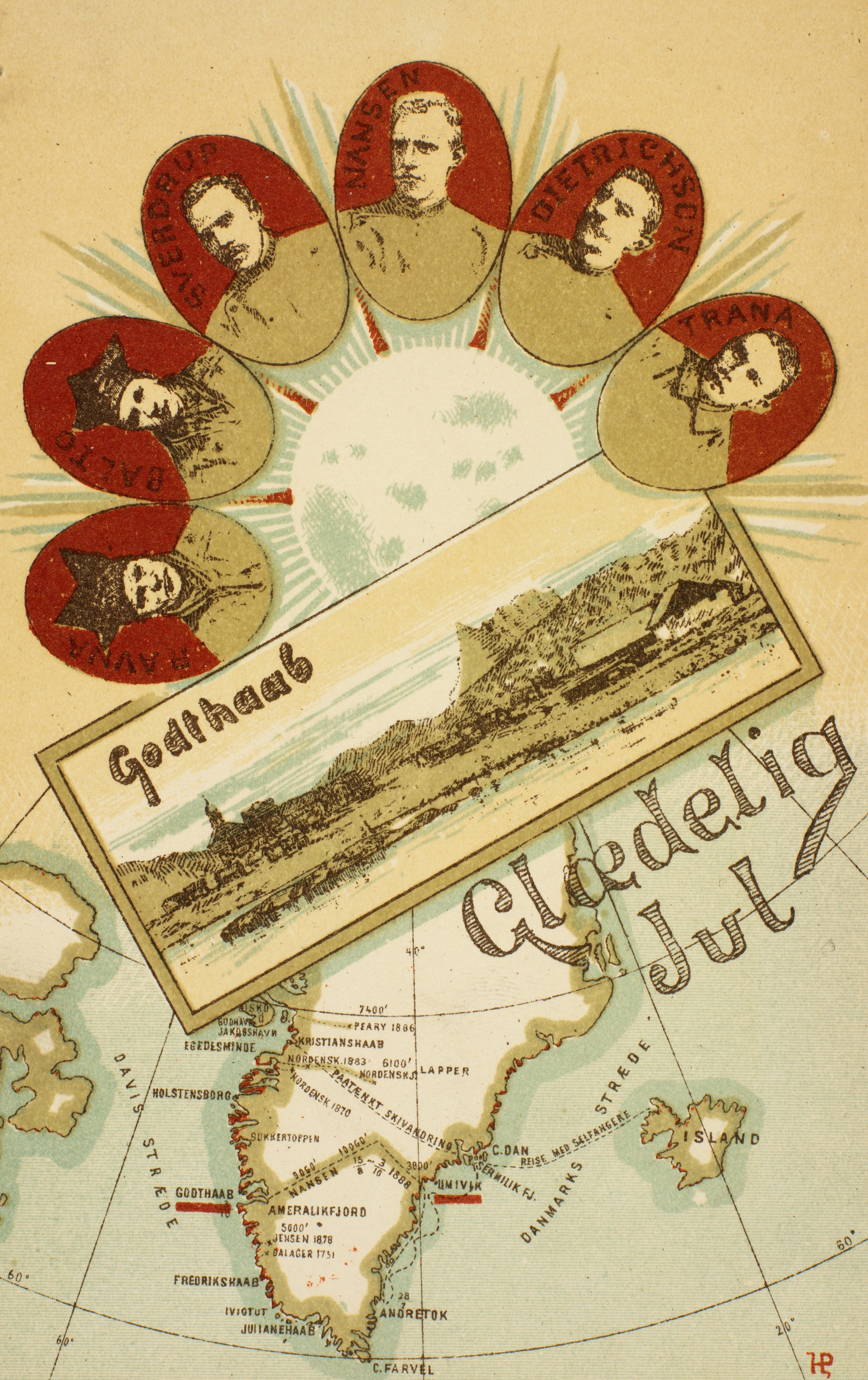
Portraits of the members of the Greenland Expedition: Ole Nielsen Ravna, Samuel Balto, Otto Sverdrup, Fridtjof Nansen, Oluf Christian Dietrichson and Kristian Kristiansen

Kristian Kristiansen was born on the Trana farm in the parish of Ogndal in the present-day Steinkjer Municipality in Trøndelag, Norway. He first became acquainted with Otto Sverdrup after Sverdrup's father Ulrik bought the Trana farm in 1874. Kristiansen achieved notoriety as a cross-country skier when he, as a 13-year-old, came second in a competition for 16-year-olds.

In 1888 both Otto Sverdrup and Kristian Kristiansen were selected by Fridtjof Nansen to attend the expedition across Greenland. Nansen took him on the recommendation of Sverdrup. The other participants were Oluf Christian Dietrichson, Samuel Balto and Ole Nilsen Ravna.

Returning to Norway in 1889 was a tribute journey. Kristiansen received medals of merit from Norway, Sweden and Denmark. During the remainder of his life, Kristiansen lived and worked principally at Sneppen in the city center of Steinkjer. He spent most of his career employed by the steamship company, Indherreds Aktie-Dampskibsselskab, which was headquartered in Steinkjer.
