= Ole Nilsen Ravna =

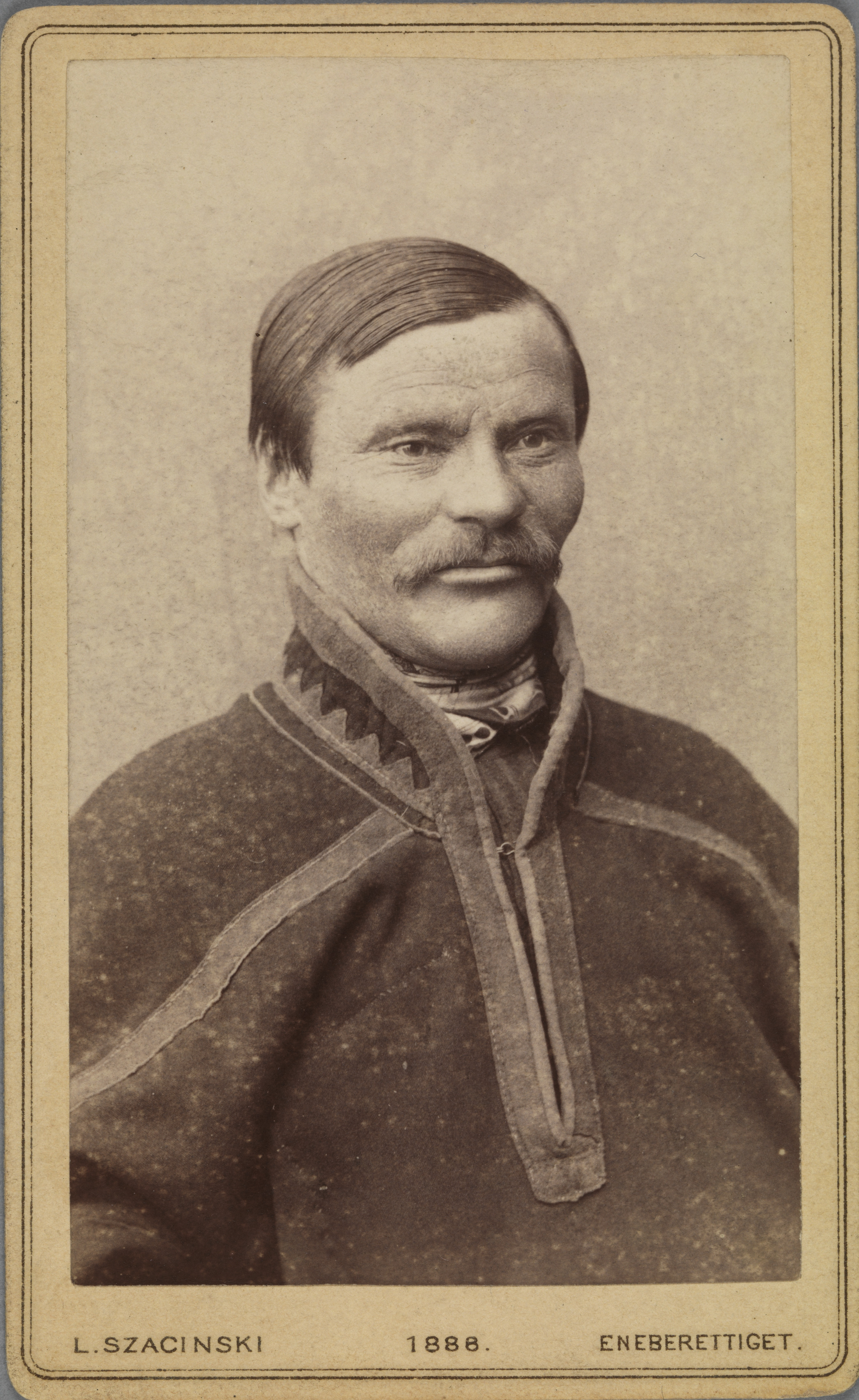
- Born: 31 October 1841; Karasjok, Norway
- Died: 11 December 1906 (aged 65); Porsanger, Norway.
- Spouse: Marit Andersdatter Jumpanen
- Children: 5
- Relatives: Anders Olsen Ravna (son); Berit Olsdatter Somby (daughter); Nils Olsen Ravna (son); Per Olsen Ravna (son); Kirsten Olsdatter Ravna (daughter)

Ole Nilsen Ravna (31 October 1841 - 11 August 1906) was a Northern Saami adventurer, explorer and reindeer herder. He skied with Fridtjof Nansen across Greenland in 1888–89.

== Biography ==
Ole Nilsen Ravna was born on October 31, 1841, in Karasjok Municipality in Finnmark county, Norway. Reindeer herding was typical work for Saami, Ole Ravna had his own herd of reindeers.

When Ravna was forty-six years old, he became a member of the Greenland expedition (1888-1889). The head of expedition, Fridtjof Nansen, was displeased with him, because Ravna had a family and motion sickness. For the last reason, Ole and his compatriot Samuel Balto had been reading the New Testament during storms.

The members of the expedition had a long way to go. They were faced with a harsh climate, but Ravna and Balto felt good. Finally, six members of the expedition passed over the Greenland ice sheet and came to the Nuuk. But when they arrived, all the ships had sailed away. For this reason, expedition stayed there for the winter. They were able to continue their journey on 15 April 1889. The explorers arrived in Copenhagen on 21 May. Finally, the expedition came back to the Oslo nine days later. Ole Ravna was awarded a silver medal for his membership in this expedition.

In 1905, the sixty-four-year-old Ole Ravna went with his compatriot Isak Klemetsen and Knud Rasmussen to the Greenland again. They wanted to develop reindeer herding there.

Ole Ravna died on 11 August 1906 in Porsanger Municipality in Norway. He was buried in the Lakselv cemetery. A monument in memory of Ravna and Balto was put in Karasjok in 2011.

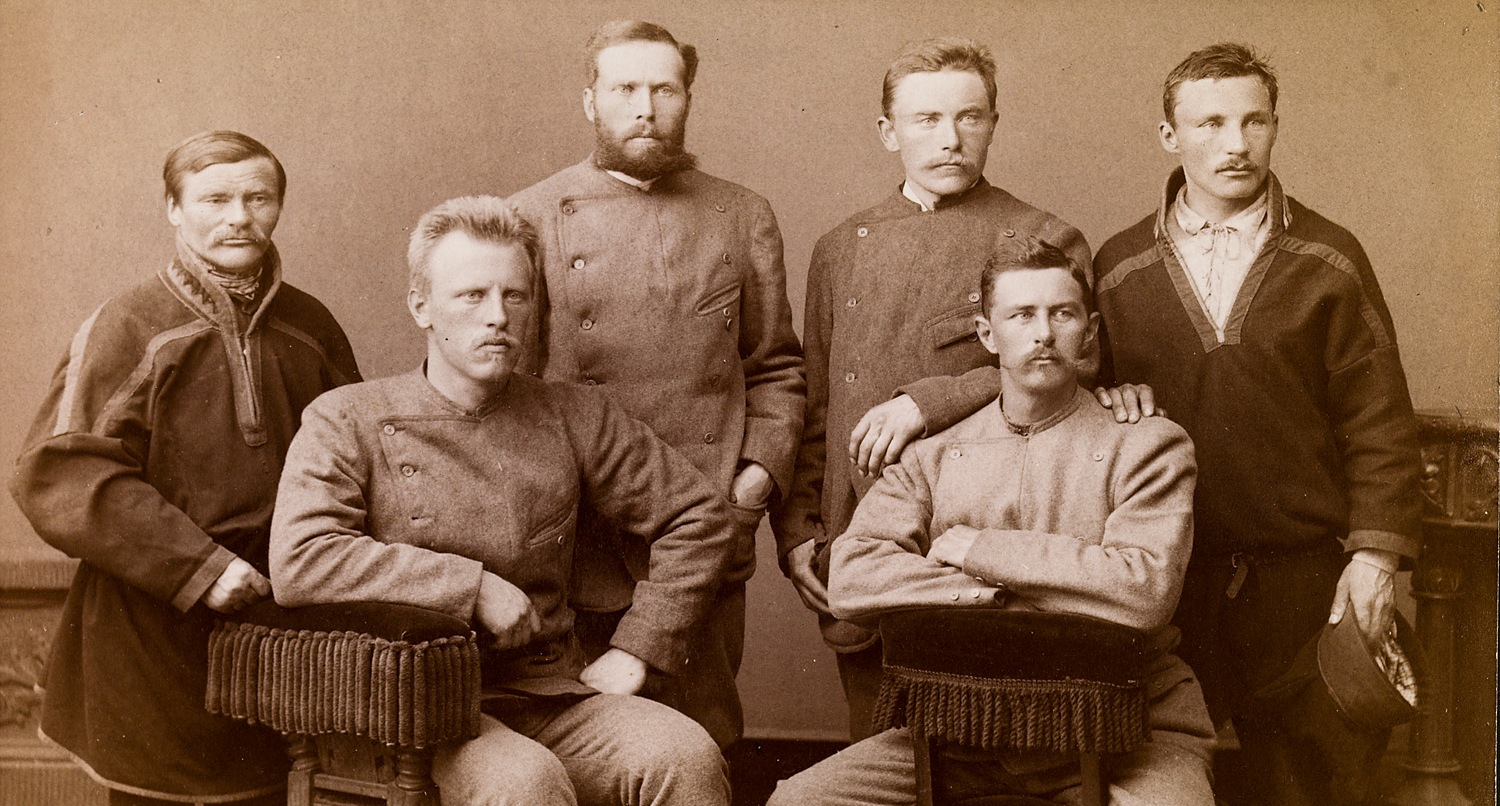

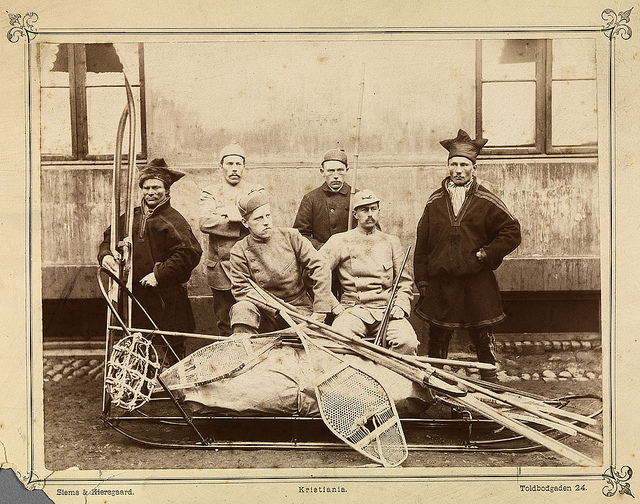

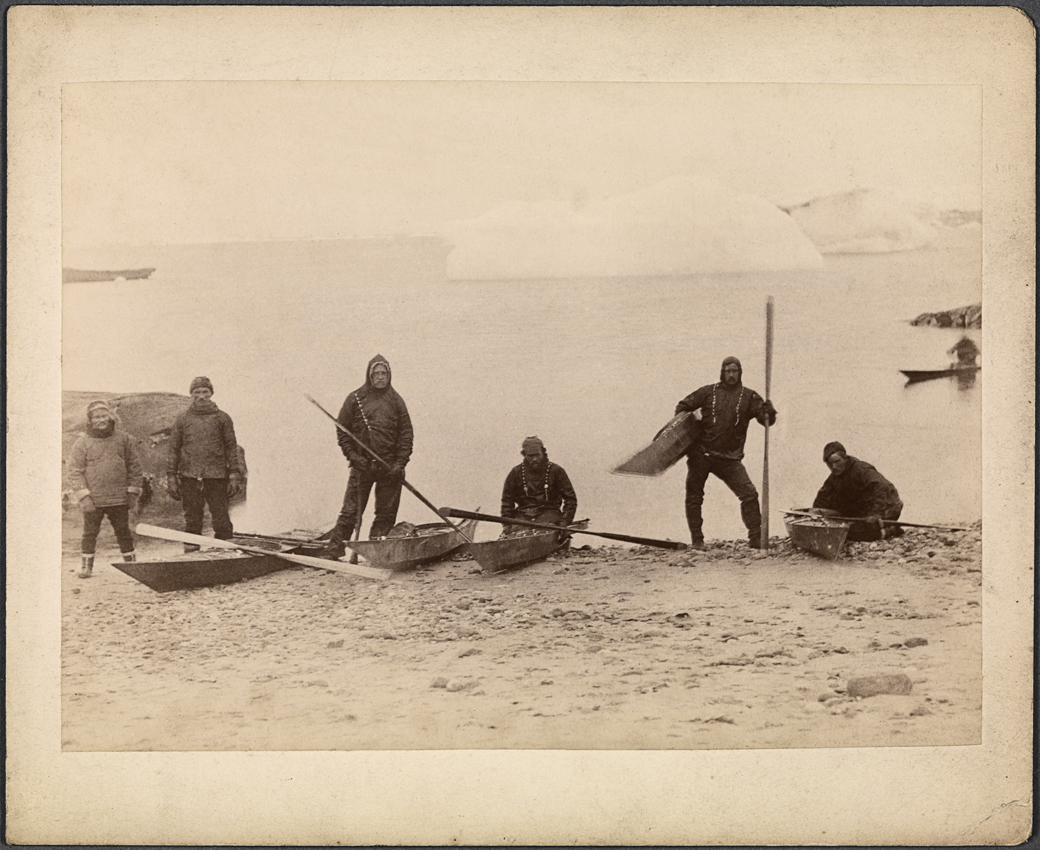

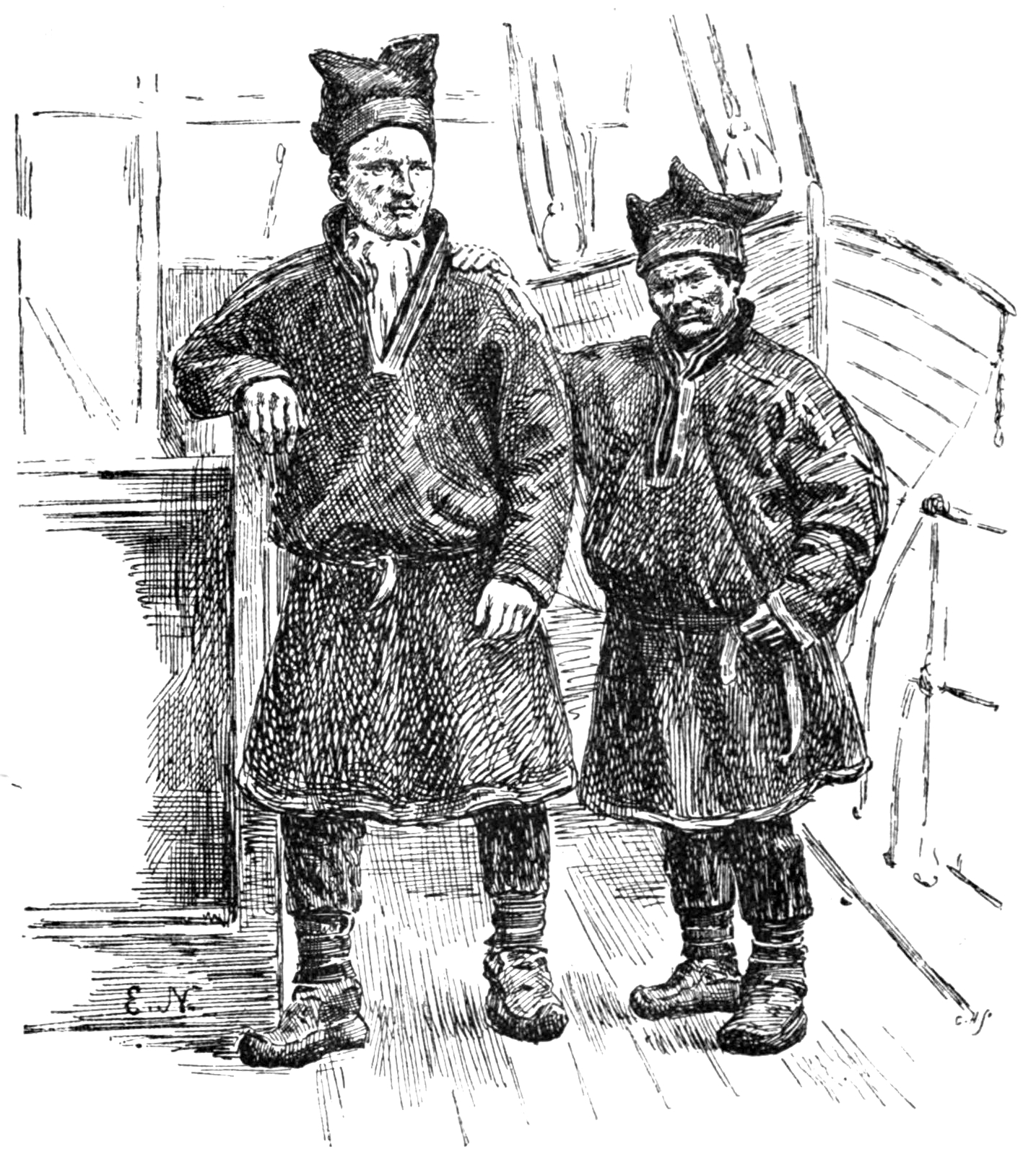
Ole Ravna with his compatriot Samuel Balto

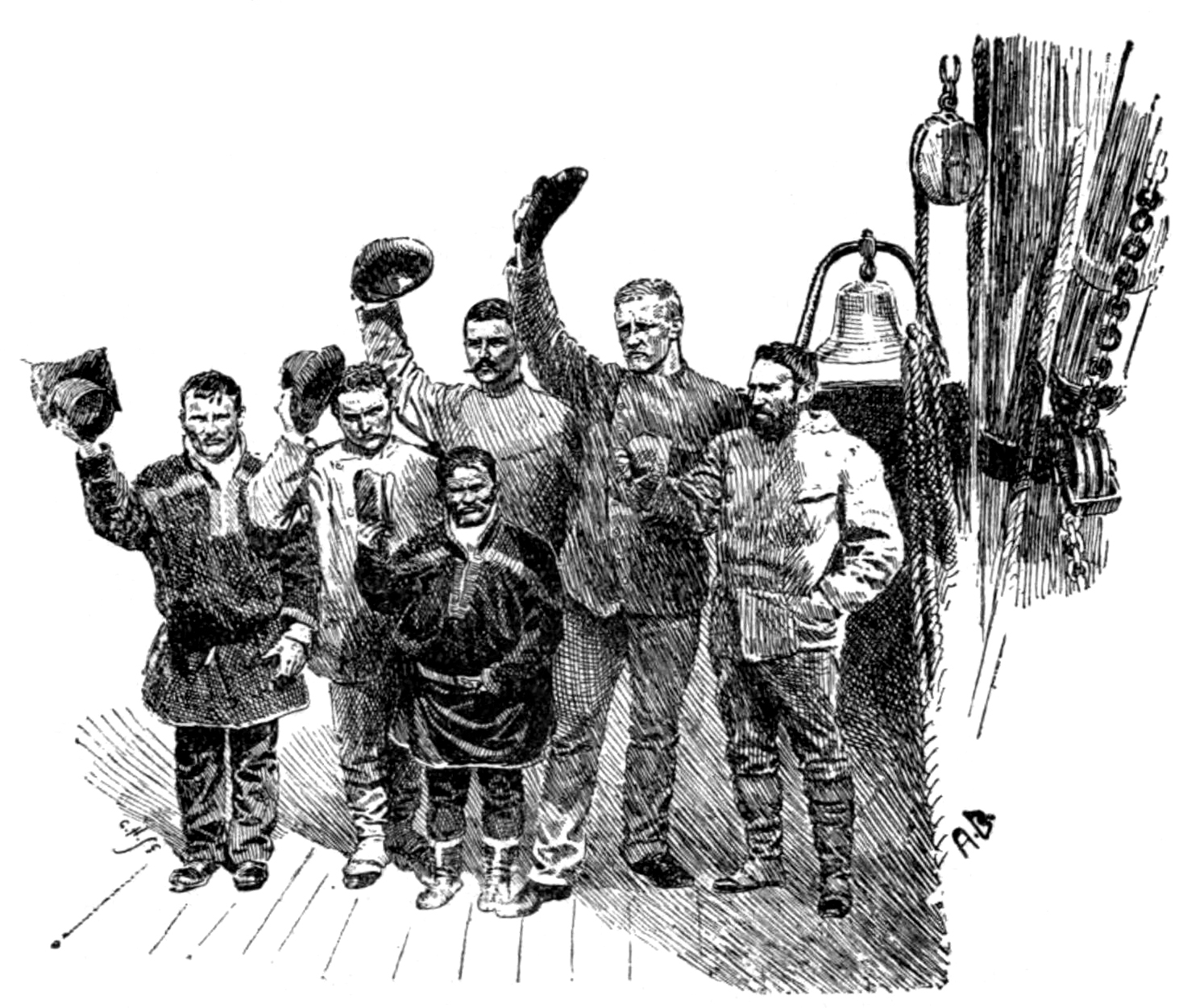
