= Sneppen Bridge =

Sneppen Bridge Sneppenbrua
- Coordinates: 64°01′01″N 11°29′23″E
- Carries: E6
- Crosses: Steinkjerelva river
- Locale: Steinkjer, Norway

Characteristics
- Material: Concrete
- Total length: 152.5 metres (500 ft)
- No. of spans: 5
- Piers in water: 6

History
- Inaugurated: 5 Aug 1987

The Sneppen Bridge (Norwegian: Sneppenbrua) is a bridge that crosses the river Steinkjerelva in the town of Steinkjer in Steinkjer Municipality in Trøndelag county, Norway. The 152.5-metre (500 ft) long concrete bridge was completed in 1987 and carries the European route E6 highway. The bridge was officially opened on 5 August 1987 by the mayor Erik Bartnes.

== See also ==
- List of bridges in Norway
- List of bridges in Norway by length
- List of bridges
- List of bridges by length
