= Niskin =

Niskin is a surname. Notable people with the surname include:

- Borghild Niskin (1924–2013), Norwegian alpine skier
- Shale Niskin (1926–1988), American inventor

== See also ==
- Niskin bottle, invented by Shale Niskin
