= Kai Island deepwater dragonet =

Scientific classification
- Domain: Eukaryota
- Kingdom: Animalia
- Phylum: Chordata
- Class: Actinopterygii
- Order: Callionymiformes
- Family: Callionymidae
- Genus: Bathycallionymus; Nakabo, 1982
- Species: B. kaianus

Binomial name
- Bathycallionymus kaianus (Günther, 1880)

Synonyms
- Callionymus kaianus Günther, 1880

Species of fish

The Kai Island deepwater dragonet (Bathycallionymus kaianus) is a species of dragonet native to the Indian Ocean and the western Pacific Ocean, from Zanzibar and the coast of East Africa to the western Pacific Ocean including southern Japan, the East China Sea and the Banda Sea. It is the only species in the monotypic genus Bathycallionymus. This species was formally described in 1880 as Callionymus kaianus by the German-born British zoologist Albert Günther with from a type collected off Kai Island in the Banda Sea during the Challenger expedition of 1872–1876. Some authorities still place this fish in the genus Callionymus.
