= Miller–Casella thermometer =

Thermometer used in the 19th Century

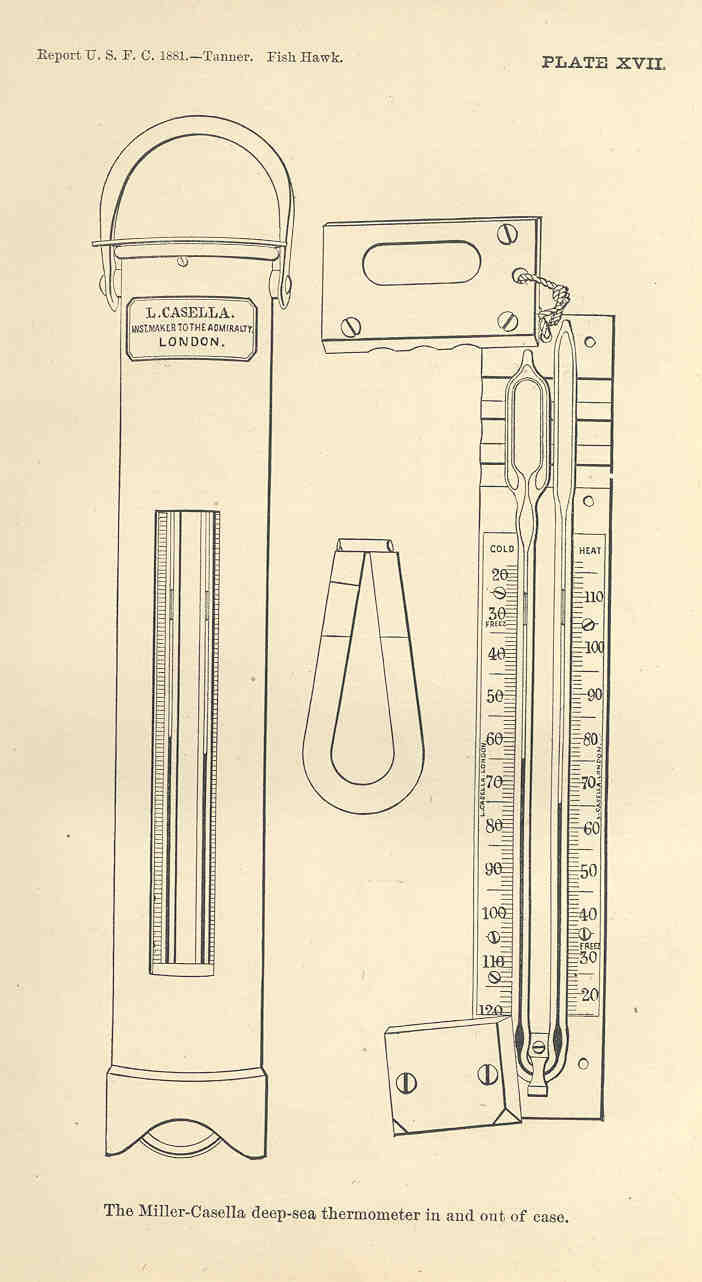
Illustration of a Miller–Casella thermometer and its case

The Miller–Casella thermometer was a Six's thermometer with a double bulb used extensively by the Challenger expedition during the late nineteenth century. The thermomemeter was used for water temperature readings along 360 different research stations around the world's oceans.

The thermometer, about nine inches (23 cm) in length, was enclosed in a copper case and filled with a solution of creosote in spirit. A U-shaped mercury tube recorded maximum and minimum temperature as the thermometer was lowered and raised into the ocean. This design assumed accurate measurements could be taken as long as the water closer to the surface of the ocean was always warmer than that below.

Scientists aboard HMS Challenger later questioned this assumption and made temperature measurements with reversing thermometers instead, which wouldn't require the coldest water to be at the ocean's bottom.
