= Gabriel Wharton =

Gabriel Wharton may refer to:

- Gabriel C. Wharton (1824–1906), American civil engineer and soldier
- Gabriel Caldwell Wharton (1839–1887), Union Army officer

== See also ==
- Gabriel Warton Lee (1880–1928), British geologist and palaeontologist
