= Rosette sampler =

Device for deep-water water sampling

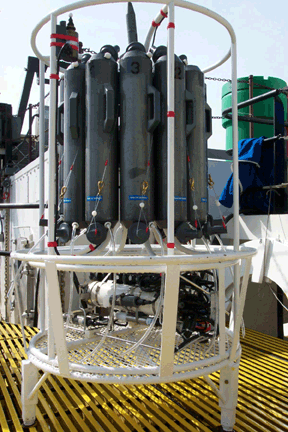
A rosette sampler

Side and top views with (grey) Niskin bottles and (blue) CTD-logger

A rosette sampler (also known as a CTD-rosette or carousel) is a device used for water sampling in deep water. Rosette samplers are used in the ocean and large inland water bodies such as the North American Great Lakes in order to investigate quality. Rosette samplers are a key piece of equipment in oceanography and have been used to collect information over many years in repeat hydrographic surveys.

== Description ==
A rosette sampler is made of an assembly of 12 to 36 sampling bottles. Each bottle is a volume that range from a minimum value of 1.2 L to a maximum value of 30 L. The bottles are clustered around a cylinder situated in the center of the assembly, where there is a sensing system called Sea-Bird or CTD, that stands for "Conductivity, Temperature and Depth", although other variables can be measured by modern CTDs (e.g. water turbidity, dissolved oxygen concentration, chlorophyll concentration and pH).

The apparatus is attached to a wire rope. A winch on board of the boat unrolls the rope during descent and rolls up it during the ascent (i.e. at the end of the samples collection). During operations in the ocean, a rosette sampler can approach the seabed at a distance from 1 to 5 m, depending on the particular sea conditions.

The opening of each sampling bottle can be automatic (by reaching a certain depth) or manual (by operator, remotely).

== Applications ==
Water sampling is used in general for chemical analysis and ecotoxicological assessment.

A rosette sampler is preferred to Winchester sampler for collection of water samples at depths greater than 50 m.

CTD-rosette samplers
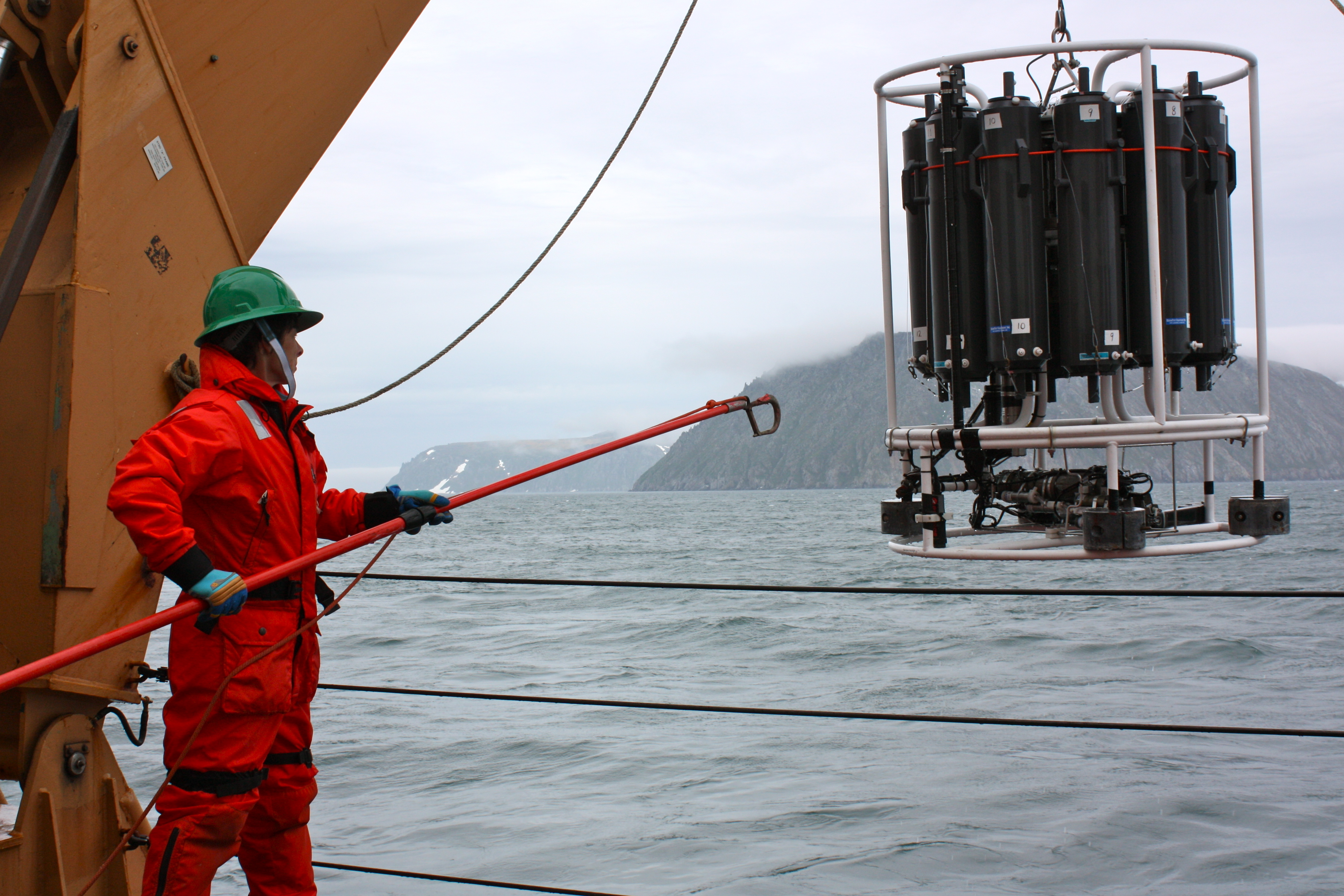
A teacher retrieves a CTD-rosette from the waters of the Bering Strait on the ICESCAPE mission in June 2011.

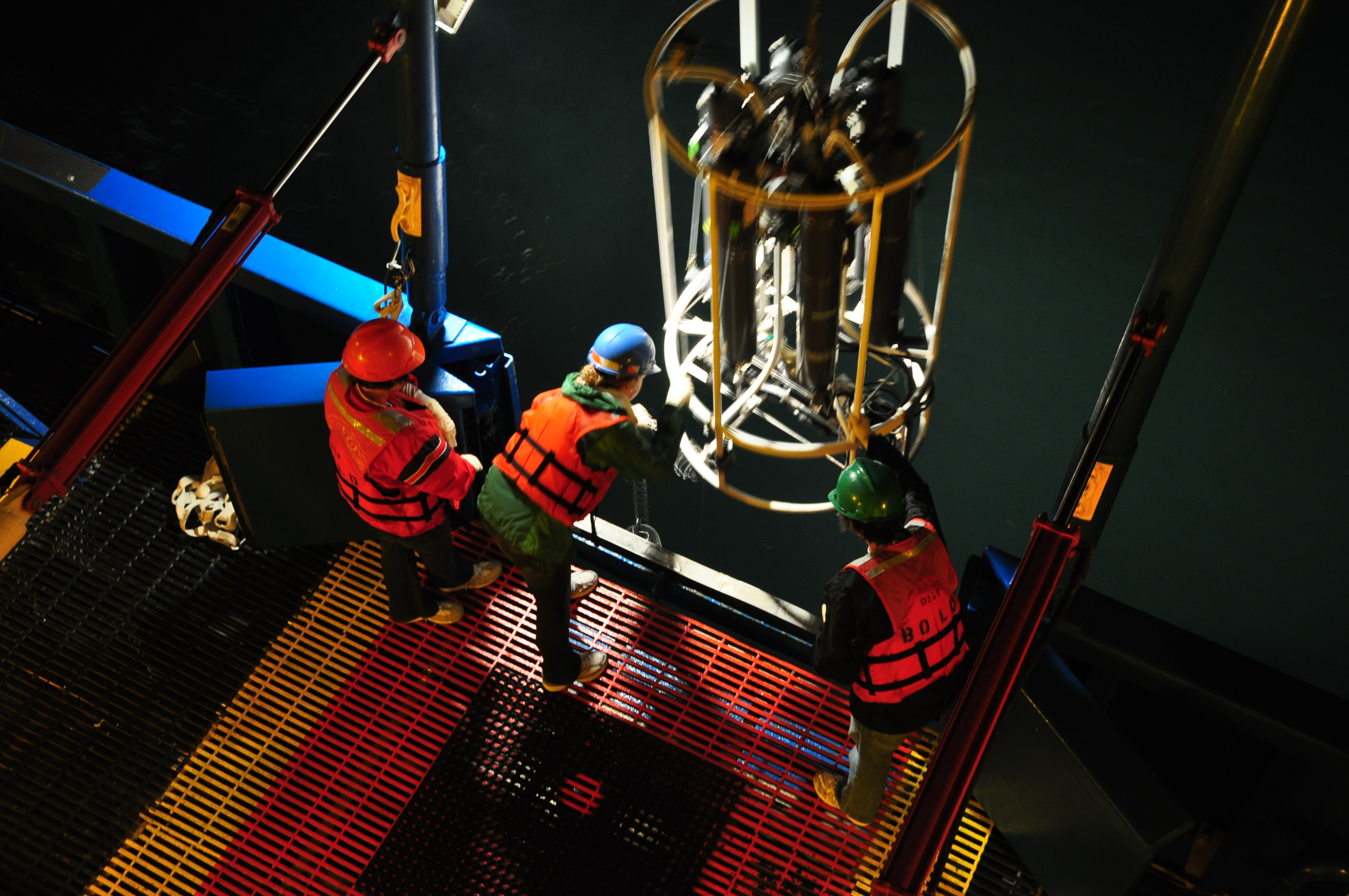
Researchers deploy a CTD-rosette at night.

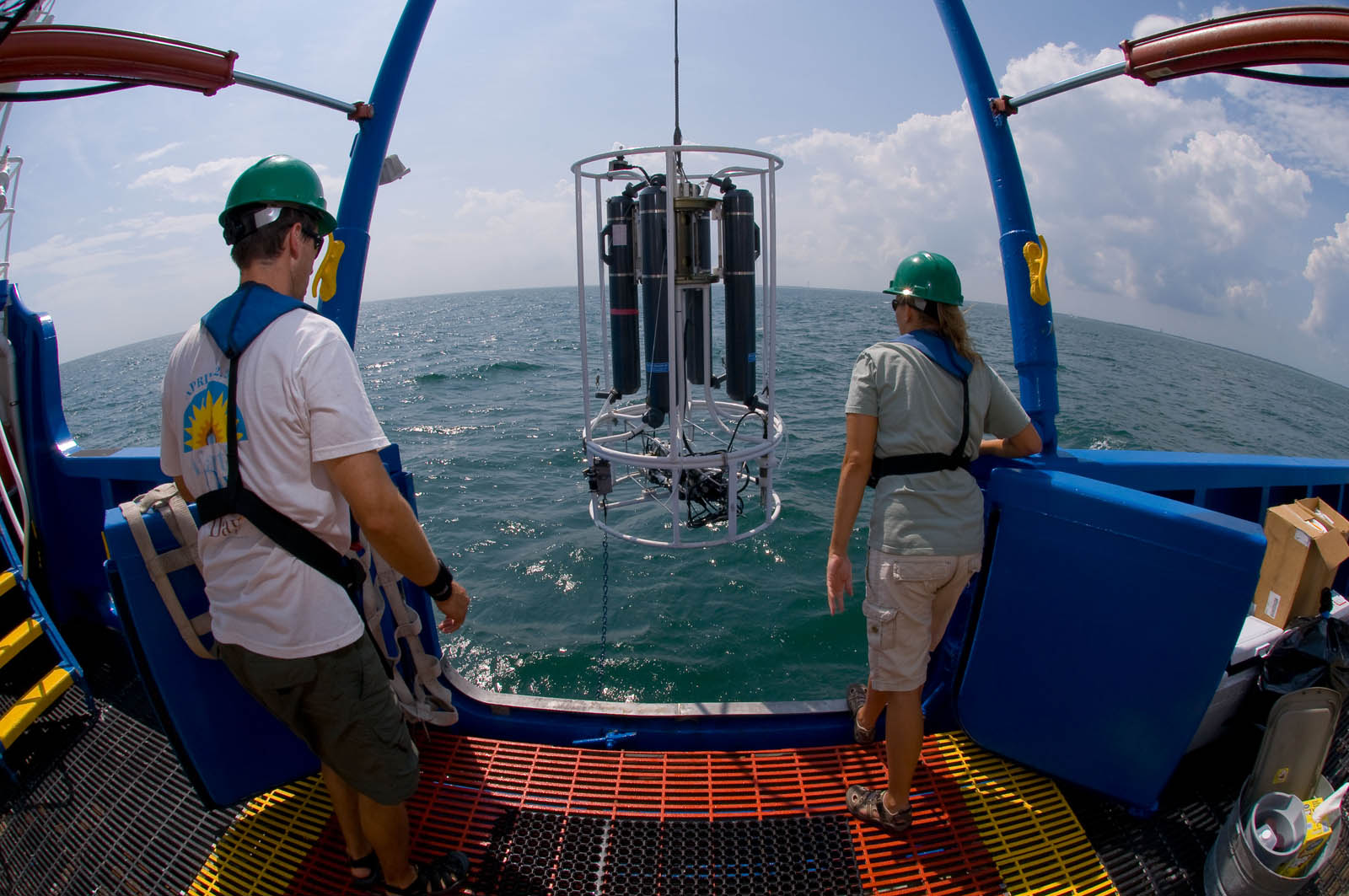
Researchers watch while a CTD-rosette is lowered into the water from EPA's Bold research vessel.

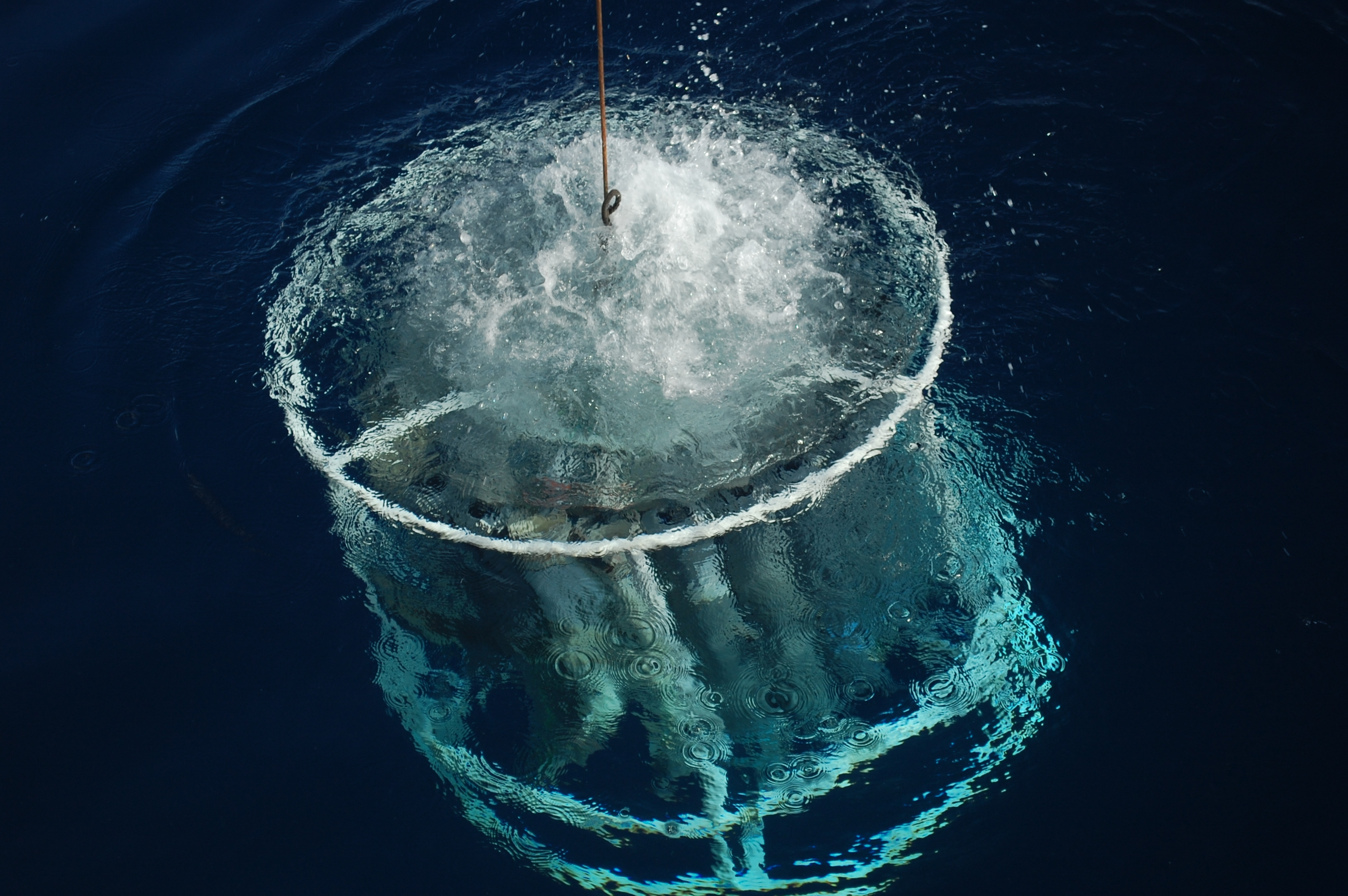
A CTD-rosette is lowered to just under the water surface from NOAA Ship PISCES.

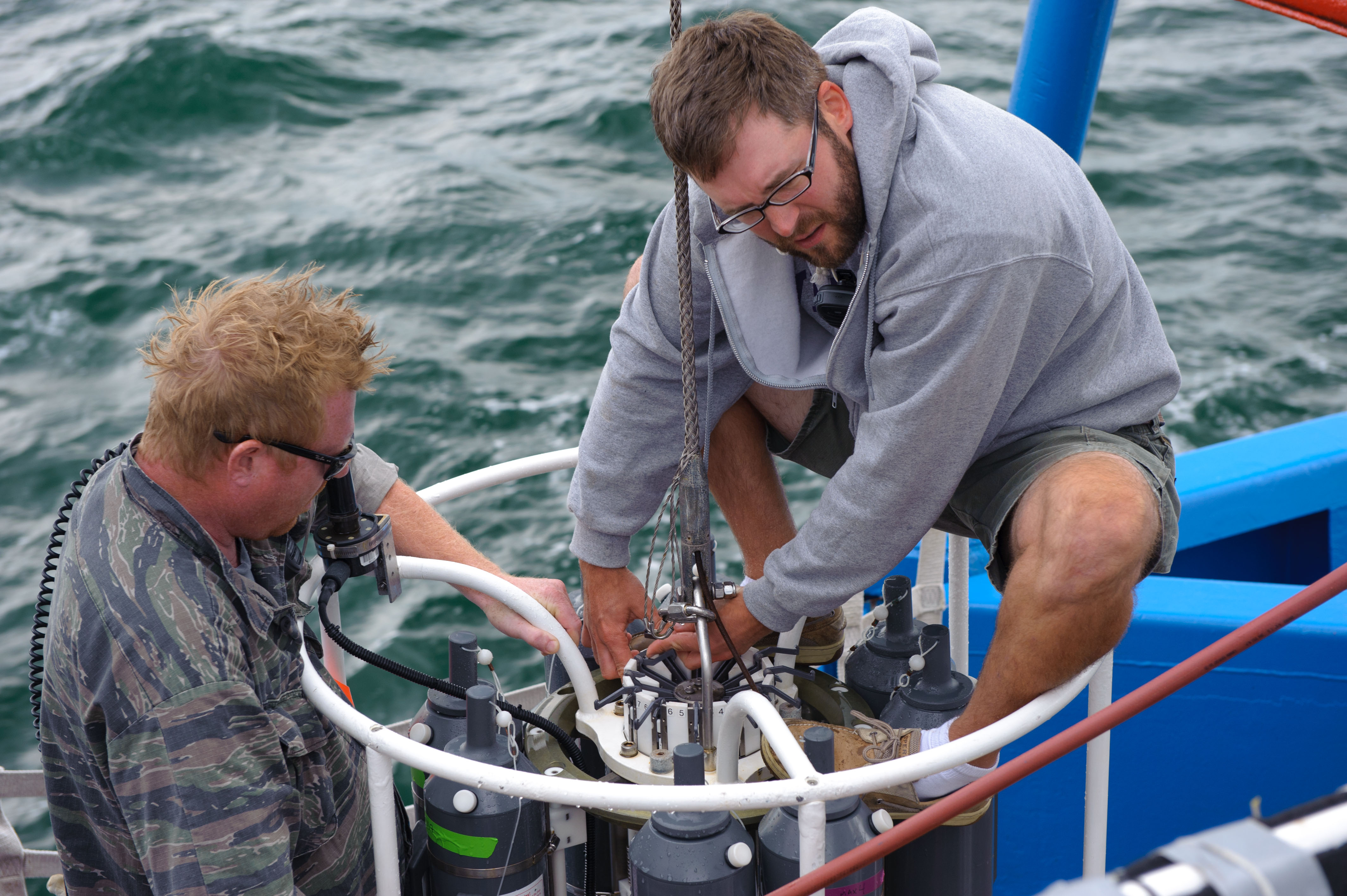
Technicians prepare a CTD-rosette for sampling by pulling back and securing the cables that hold the Niskin bottles in their open positions. When the rosette is in the water, someone on the ship will remotely trigger sampling, and the circular cable holder at the top of the rosette will release cables, closing the bottles one by one at specific water depths.

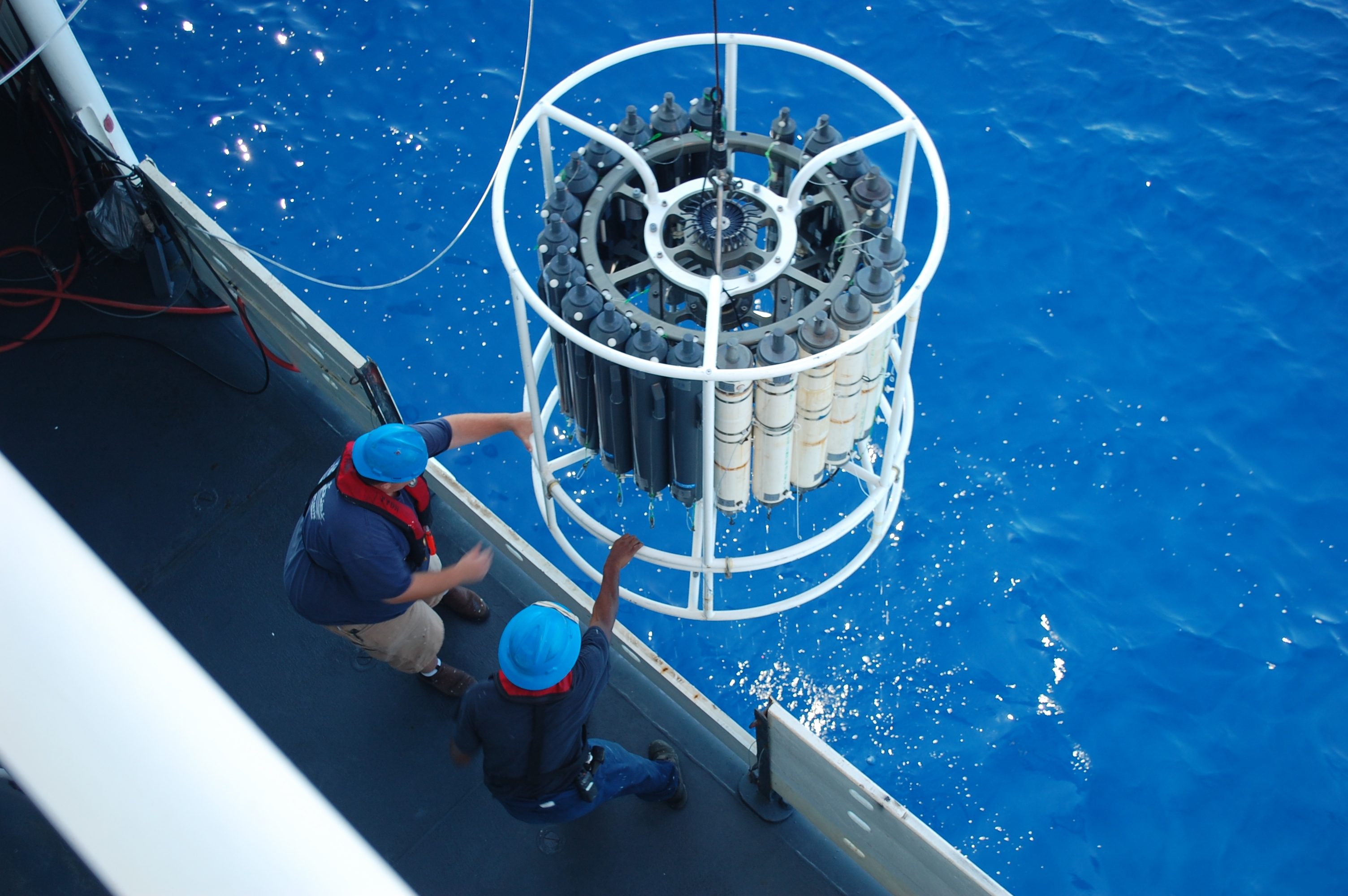
Crew of the NOAA Ship PISCES recover a large CTD-rosette.

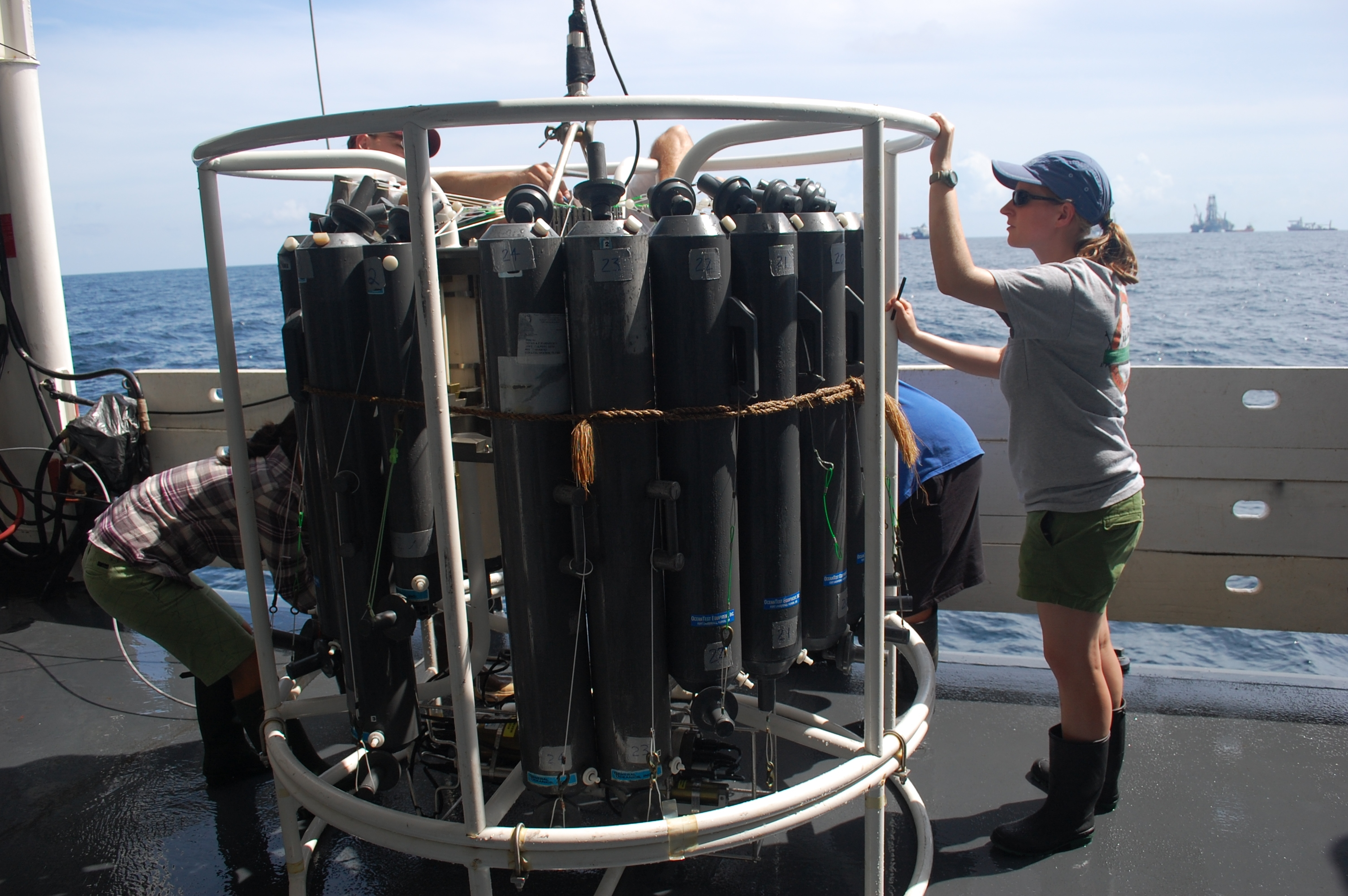
Researchers prepare a CTD-rosette for taking measurements and water samples at the Deep Water Horizon oil spill site.

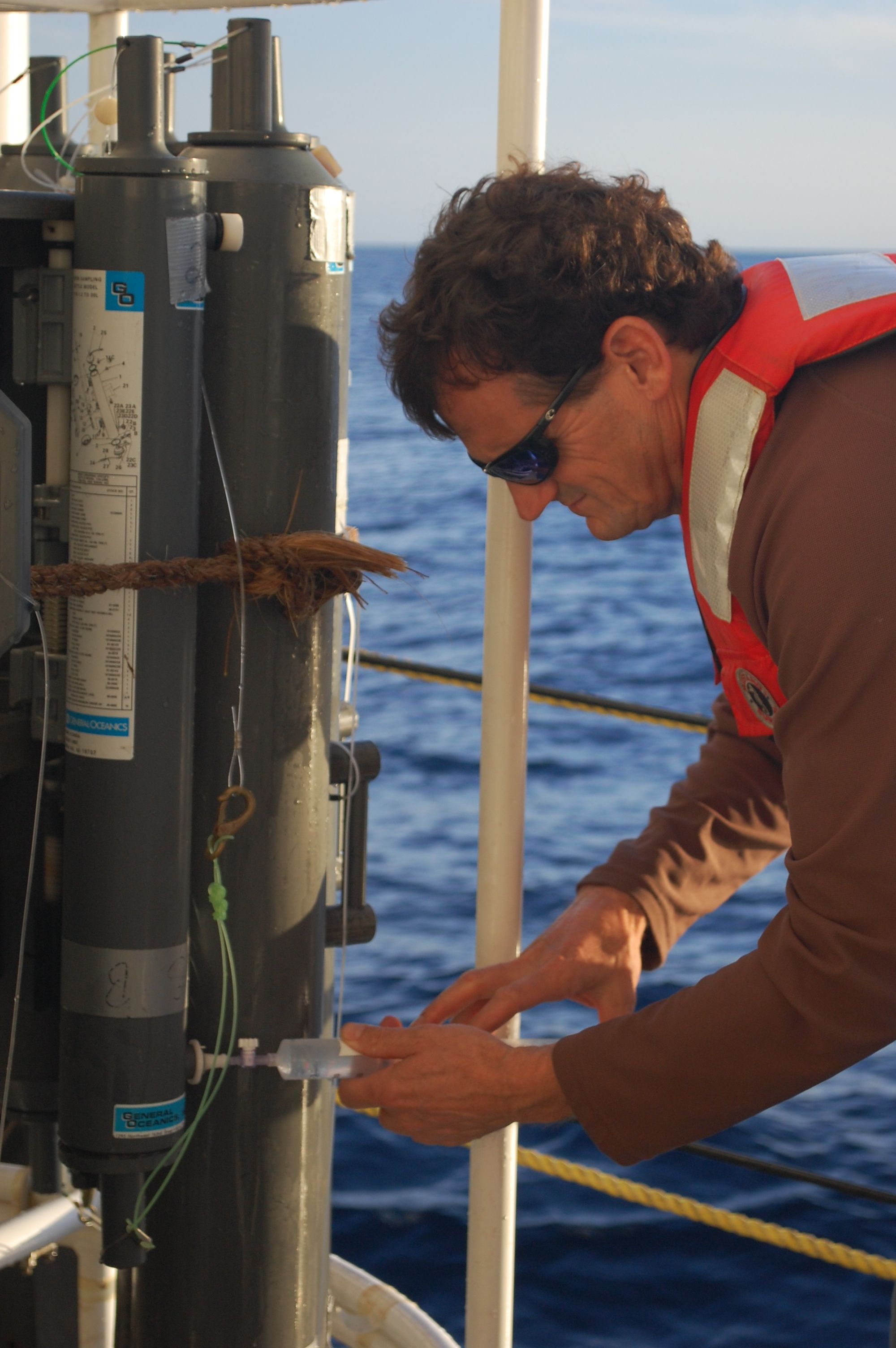
A scientist collects water from a Niskin bottles directly into a syringe type filtration container on NOAA Ship PISCES.

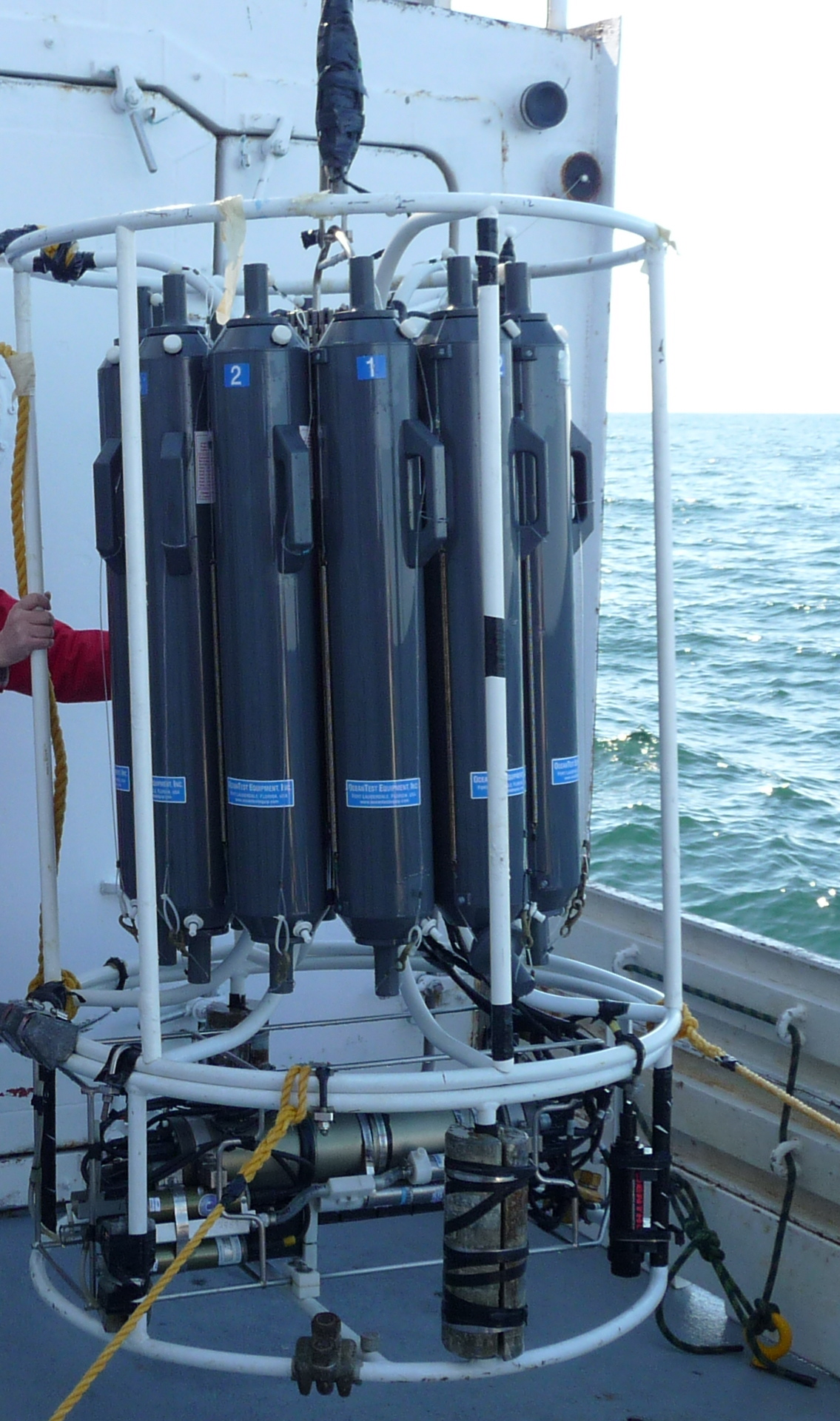
A CTD-rosette is ready for deployment. The top section holds the Niskin bottless while the bottom section holds the CTD instrument and other electronic sensors (such as a fluorometer to measure chlorophyll fluorescence and a transmissometer to measure turbidity).

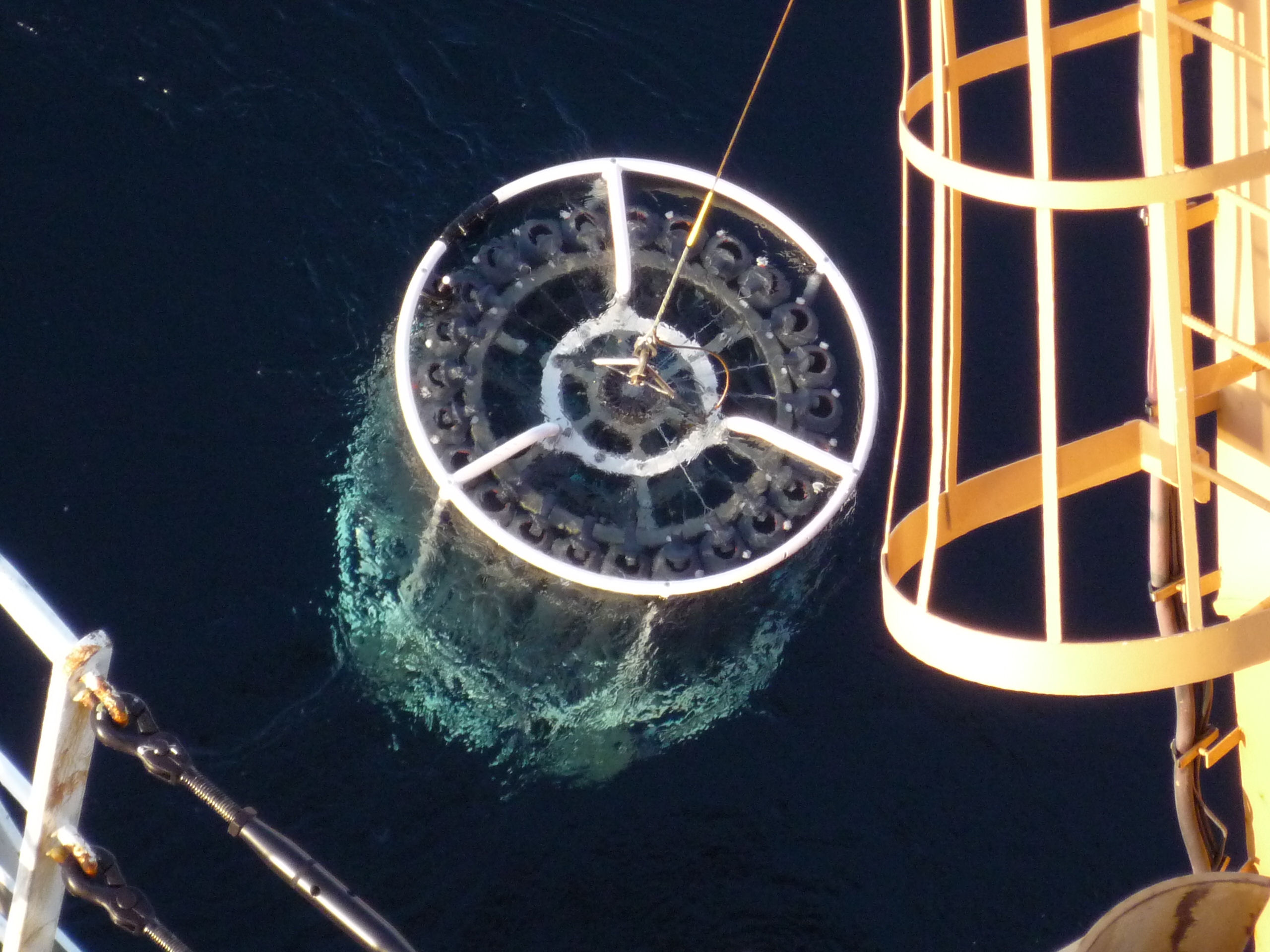
A CTD-rosette comes up out of the water just before it gets recovered and brought on deck of the ship.

== Bibliography ==
- U.S. Environmental Protection Agency, "Field Sampling Using the Rosette Sampler"
