= Reversing thermometer =

Thermometer that records temperature

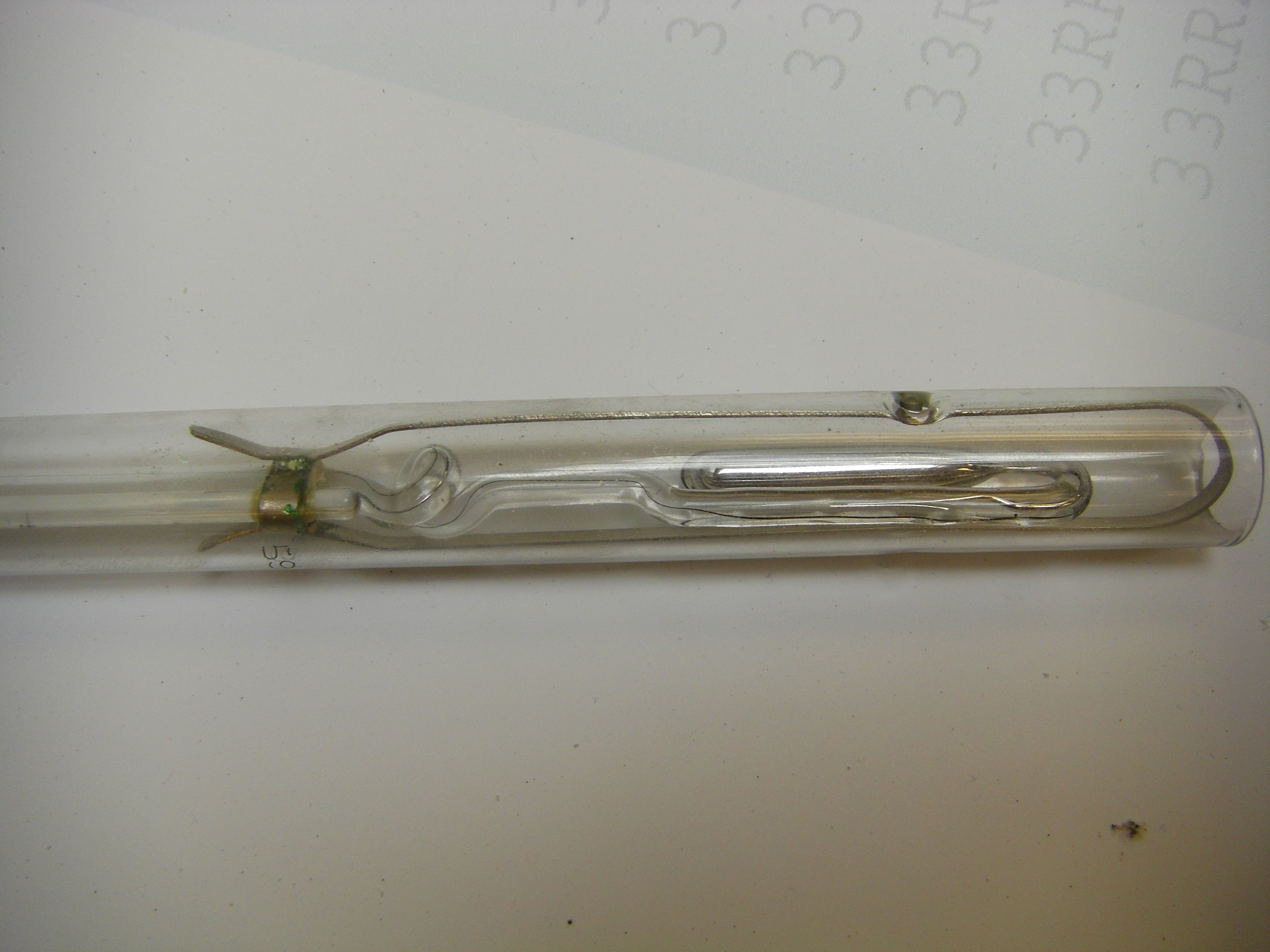
Unprotected reversing thermometer

A reversing thermometer is a mercury-in-glass thermometer which, unlike most conventional mercury thermometers, has the unique ability to record a temperature for later viewing. When inverted, these thermometers capture and display the current temperature until they are returned to their upright position.

In oceanography, some varieties are referred to as deep sea reversing thermometers (DSRTs). From around 1900 to 1970, reversing thermometers were the primary instruments oceanographers relied on to measure water temperatures beneath the ocean's surface. DSRTs were slowly replaced by bathythermographs and CTDs.

== History ==
Modified versions of Six's thermometer were used prior to the DSRT, which used alcohol, mercury, and human hair tied to indices to record temperature. However, Six's thermometer could only record the coldest temperature and was described by Professor Wyville Thomson as a 'minimum' thermometer. The inaccuracy, tediousness, and uncertainty of measurement in Six's thermometer led to a desire for a more reliable oceanographic instrument.

Development was spurred around 1857 by Joseph Warren Zambra and Henry Negretti in response to Admiral FitzRoy's description of problems with conventional thermometers in oceanic settings. The first description in scientific literature of DSRTs emerged in 1874, though the method of "reversing" was used on the Challenger expedition.

== Construction and application ==
A reversing thermometer is a bundle that consists of two individual thermometers: the main, where mercury flows and is trapped, and the auxiliary, which is not trapped and serves as a measure of ambient conditions when the reading is made.

The main thermometer consists of a conventional, large-reservoir bulb connected to a capillary in which a constriction is placed so that upon reversal the mercury column breaks off in a reproducible manner. This break off point is sometimes referred to as the thermometer appendix. The mercury runs down into a smaller bulb at the other end of the capillary, which is graduated to read temperature. A 360° turn (the thermometer loop) in a locally widened portion of the capillary serves as a trap to prevent further addition of mercury if the thermometer is warmed and the mercury expands past the break-off point.

Reversing thermometers also come in two varieties: protected and unprotected. Protected DSRTs are completely enclosed in glass, reducing or nullifying the effect of pressure on the instrument. Protected DSRTs also have a mercury bath surrounding the reservoir, acting to conduct external temperature to the reservoir. Unprotected DSRTs on the other hand have an open glass shell, allowing seawater to compress the mercury column. When used together, the effect of compression can be used to calculate the depth where they were reversed.

=== In oceanography ===
The remote-reading potentialities of reversing thermometers make them particularly suitable for use in measuring subsea temperature as a function of pressure (supplementing bucket thermometers for surface temperature and sling pychrometer thermometers for humidity). In this application, both protected thermometers and unprotected thermometers are used, each of which is provided with an auxiliary thermometer.

Reversing thermometers are generally used with Nansen bottles to record temperature when a sample is taken. They are usually read to 0.01 °C, and after the proper corrections have been applied, their readings are considered reliable to 0.02 °C.

== Problems ==
Reversing thermometers are known to have a number of problems, especially in ocean applications. First, the instrument is almost entirely glass and chips or gauges on the thermometer shell could become a point of implosion at higher pressures. Mercury columns may also separate - making it hard to measure the exact volume responsible for thermal expansion. Thermometers may also break off at a point other than the break point, a common cause of a thermometer falling through (when mercury continues to flow into a thermometer after breaking). The opposite, when mercury does not flow into the chamber, is commonly referred to as being stuck.
