= John James Wild =

Swiss linguist, oceanographer and natural history illustrator and lithographer (1824-1900)

John James Wild FRGS
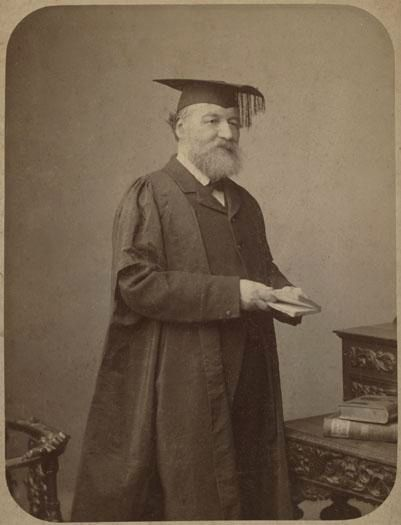
- Wild as examiner at the University of Melbourne
- Born: Jean Jacques Wild; 1824; Zürich, Switzerland
- Died: 3 June 1900 (aged 75–76); St Kilda, Victoria, Australia

John James Wild FRGS (born Jean Jacques Wild; 1824 – 3 June 1900) was a Swiss linguist, oceanographer and a natural history illustrator and lithographer, whose images were noted for their precision and clarity. He participated in the Challenger expedition of 1872–76. In 1881 he emigrated to the Colony of Victoria, where he contributed to Frederick McCoy's Prodromus of the Zoology of Victoria.

== Biography ==
Wild was born in Zurich, Switzerland, in 1824.

Wild met his wife, Elizabeth Ellen Mullen, while teaching languages in Belfast, Ireland.

Wild joined the 1872–1876 Challenger expedition as official artist and secretary. This expedition, carried out by the Royal Society, spent four years surveying the oceans. Equipped with a dark room aboard HMS Challenger, photographers were able to develop and print images soon after they were taken. This expedition is thought to have been the first to make use of photography as well as the services of an artist. Wild's contribution to the expedition's reports was Thalassa, An Essay on the Depth, Temperature and Currents of the Ocean, and for which he received an honorary doctorate from the University of Zürich. He also wrote and illustrated a book on the expedition, At Anchor, a Narrative of Experiences Afloat and Ashore During the Voyage of H.M.S. "Challenger" from 1872 to 1876.

Wild emigrated to Melbourne, Australia, in 1881. Having been turned down repeatedly by New Zealand in his quest for work, he managed to eke out a living in Melbourne by giving lectures in modern languages and literature at Trinity College, supplemented by acting as matriculation examiner in French and German, and moonlighting as secretary and artist.

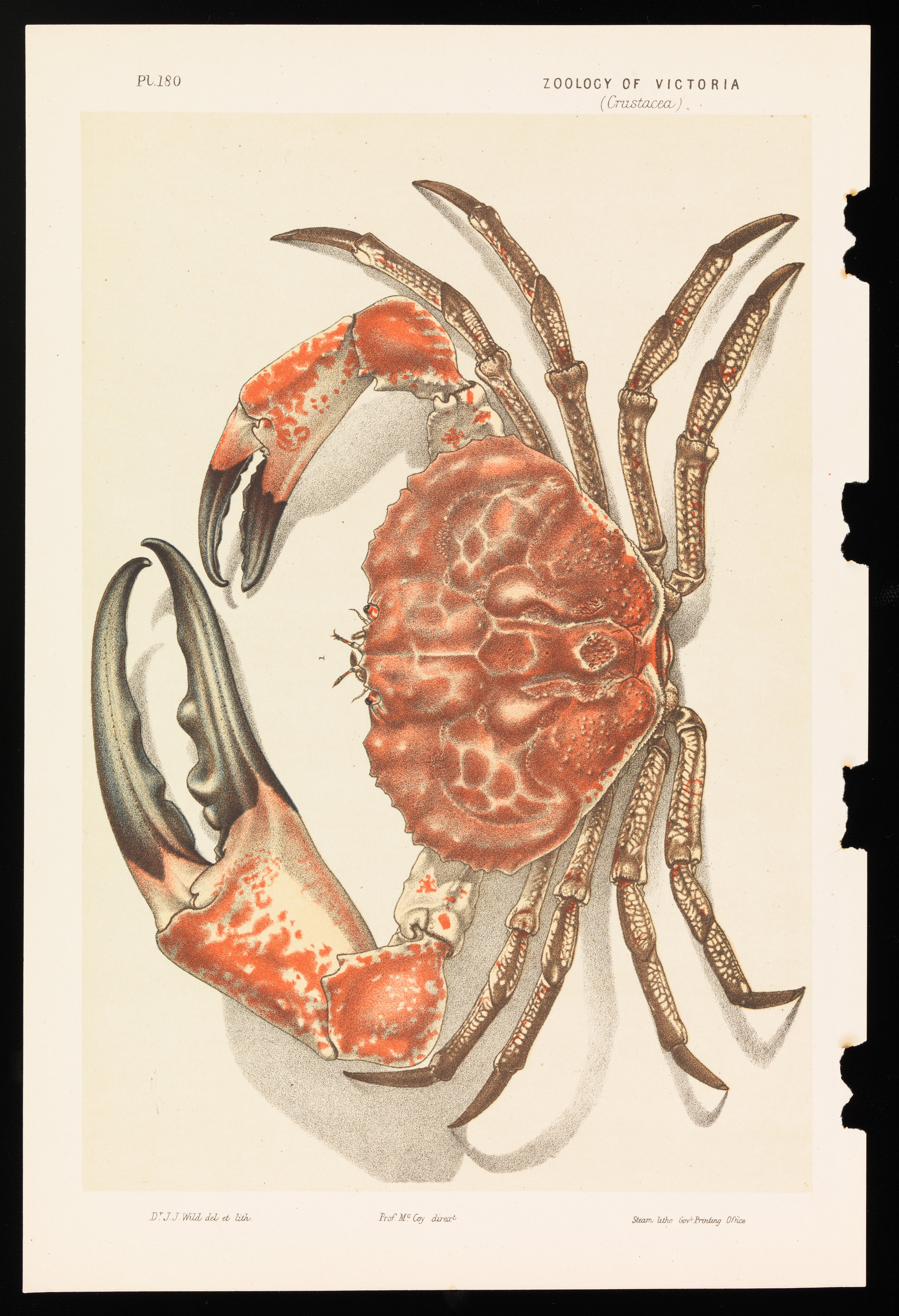
Pseudocarcinus gigas, illustrated by Wild c. 1889

As he had with Frederick Schoenfeld and Arthur Bartholomew, Frederick McCoy quickly appreciated Wild's potential to contribute to his Prodromus of the Zoology of Victoria, and Wild's most important Australian legacy was this work he carried out for McCoy. His skill in producing accurate images was also noticed by Walter Baldwin Spencer, Professor of Biology at Melbourne University, who became Director of the National Museum, and who commissioned Wild to illustrate the Giant Gippsland Earthworm for the Philosophical Society in 1888. In the same year Wild delivered the inaugural lecture on Anthropology at the Australasian Association for the Advancement of Science in Sydney.

He died in 1900 in the Melbourne suburb of St Kilda.

Two geographic features are named for him; Wild Islet in the D'Entrecasteaux Islands, and Wild Knoll in Antarctica's Ellsworth Mountains.

== Selected works ==
- Wild, John James (1877). Thalassa: An Essay on the Depth, Temperature, and Currents of the Ocean. London: Marcus Ward & Company. doi:10.5962/bhl.title.12972. OCLC 8501801.
- —— (1878). At Anchor, a Narrative of Experiences Afloat and Ashore During the Voyage of H.M.S. "Challenger" from 1872 to 1876. London: Marcus Ward & Company. doi:10.5962/bhl.title.149586. OCLC 4977223.
