= Challenger expedition =

Oceanographic research expedition (1872–1876)

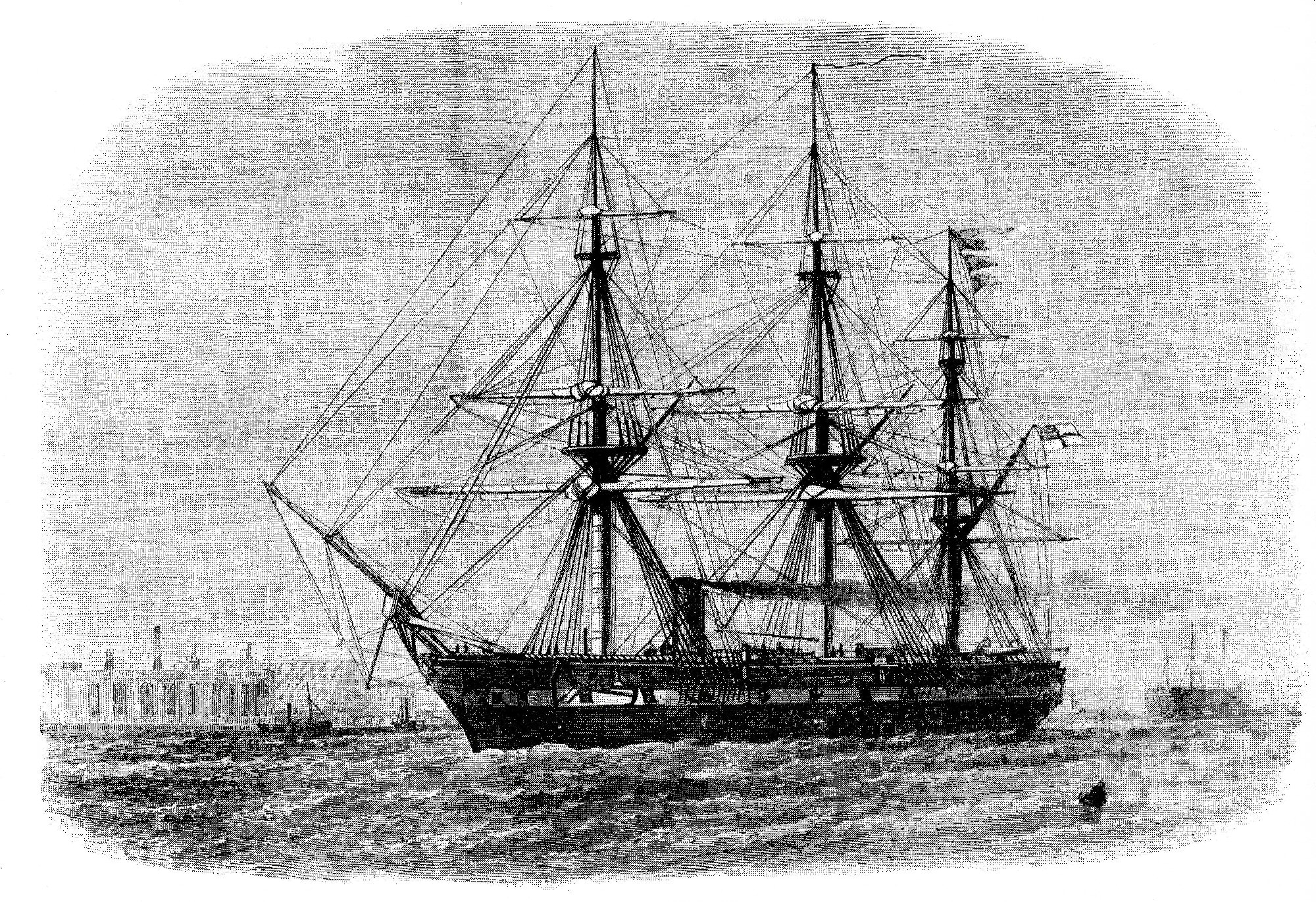
- HMS Challenger refitted at Sheerness in 1872, The Illustrated London News
- Sponsor: Royal Society of London, Royal Navy
- Country: United Kingdom
- Leader: Captain George Nares
- Start: Portsmouth, England; 21 December 1872
- End: Spithead, England; 24 May 1876
- Ships: HMS Challenger
- Crew: 237 (21 officers, 216 crew)
- Survivors: 144

Route
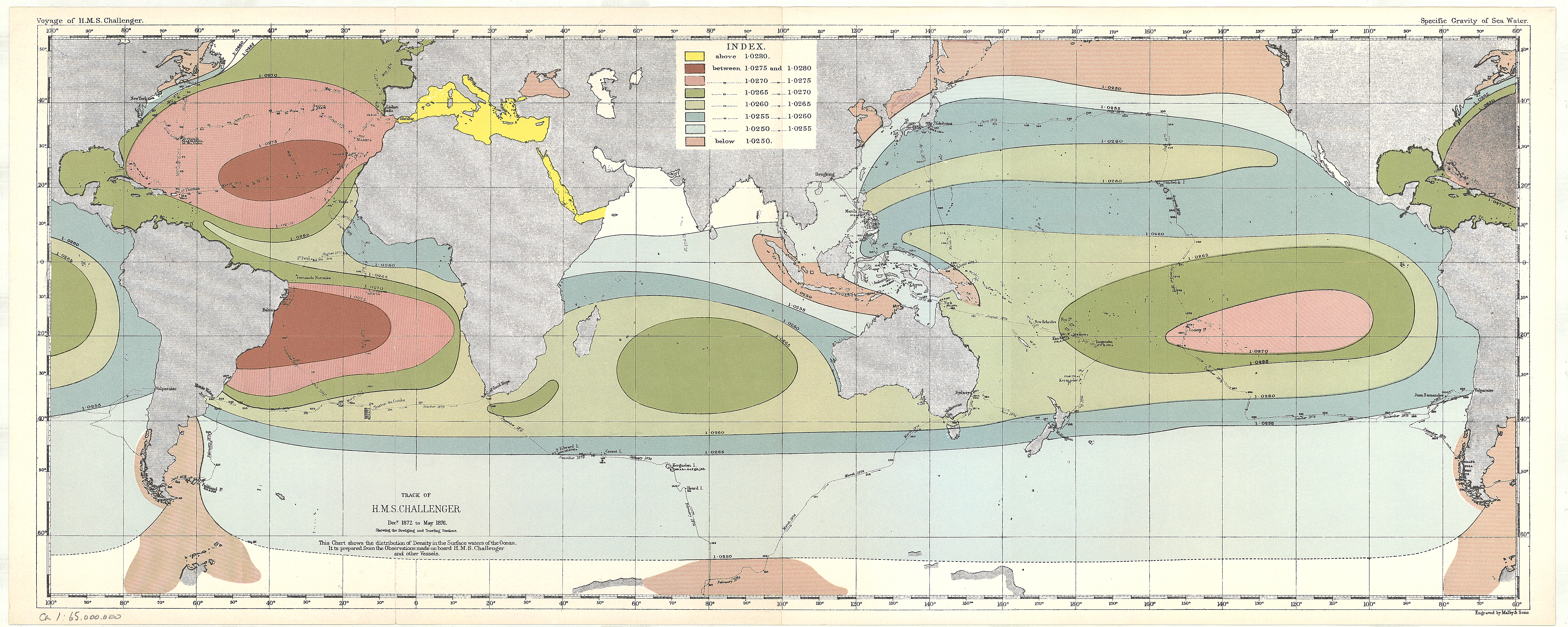
- Track of HMS Challenger from December 1872 until May 1876. The colour contours represent ocean surface density.

The Challenger expedition of 1872–1876 was a scientific programme that made many discoveries to lay the foundation of oceanography. The expedition was named after the naval vessel that undertook the trip, HMS Challenger.

The expedition, initiated by William Benjamin Carpenter, was placed under the scientific supervision of Sir Charles Wyville Thomson—of the University of Edinburgh and Merchiston Castle School—assisted by five other scientists, including Sir John Murray, a secretary-artist and a photographer. The Royal Society of London obtained the use of Challenger from the Royal Navy and in 1872 modified the ship for scientific tasks at Sheerness, equipping it with separate laboratories for natural history and chemistry. The expedition, led by Captain George Nares, sailed from Portsmouth, England, on 21 December 1872. Other naval officers included Commander John Maclear.

Under the scientific supervision of Thomson himself, the ship travelled approximately 68,890 nautical miles (79,280 miles; 127,580 kilometres) surveying and exploring. The result was the Report of the Scientific Results of the Exploring Voyage of H.M.S. Challenger during the years 1873–76 which, among many other discoveries, catalogued over 4,000 previously unknown species. John Murray, who supervised the publication, described the report as "the greatest advance in the knowledge of our planet since the celebrated discoveries of the fifteenth and sixteenth centuries". Challenger sailed close to Antarctica, but not within sight of it. However, it was the first scientific expedition to take pictures of icebergs.

The expedition, which circumnavigated the Earth, collected data by lowering sounding lines to the bottom of the ocean floor to measure its depth and collect sediment samples, by collecting marine organisms by means of dredges lowered to the ocean floor and trawls lowered into the water at different depths, by measuring temperature at various depths and by collecting samples of seawater at standard depths for chemical analysis. They collected plankton samples and recorded the speed and direction of ocean surface currents. Samples were preserved in brine or alcohol, or dried, then brought to Europe and distributed to various experts to analyse.

== Preparations ==
To enable it to probe the depths, 15 of Challenger's 17 guns were removed and its spars reduced to make more space available. Laboratories, extra cabins and a special dredging platform were installed. Challenger used mainly sail power during the expedition; the steam engine was used only for dragging the dredge, station-keeping while taking soundings, and entering and leaving ports. It was loaded with specimen jars, filled with alcohol for preservation of samples, microscopes and chemical apparatus, trawls and dredges, thermometers, barometers, water sampling bottles, sounding leads, devices to collect sediment from the sea bed and great lengths of rope with which to suspend the equipment into the ocean depths.

Because of the novelty of the expedition, some of the equipment was invented or specially modified for the occasion. It carried 181 miles (291 km) of Italian hemp rope for sounding.

== Expedition ==
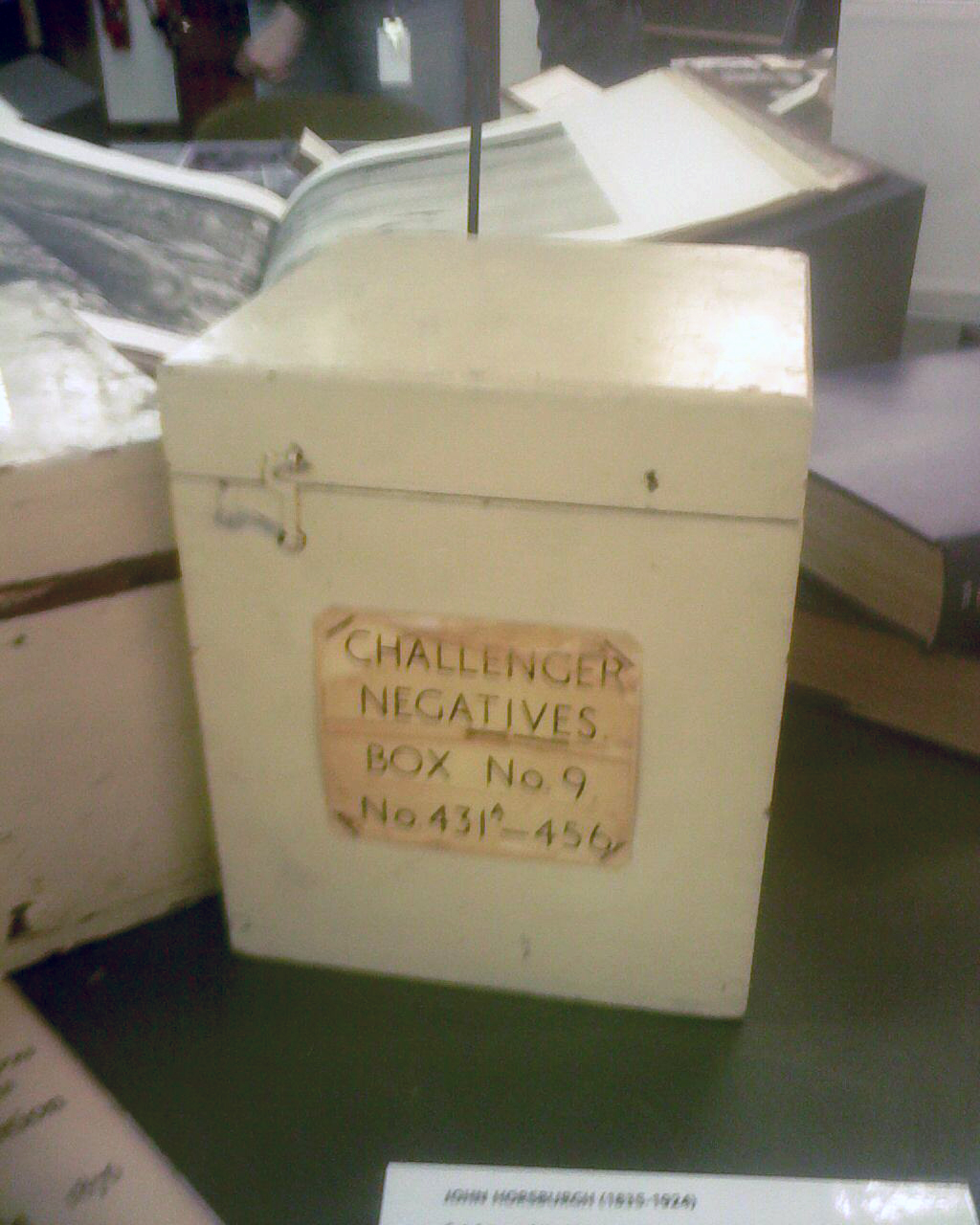
One of the original boxes containing the photographic negatives brought back from the expedition

On its landmark journey circumnavigating the globe, 492 deep sea soundings, 133 bottom dredges, 151 open water trawls and 263 serial water temperature observations were taken. About 4,700 new species of marine life were discovered.

The scientific work was conducted by Wyville Thomson, John Murray, John Young Buchanan, Henry Nottidge Moseley and Rudolf von Willemoes-Suhm. Frank Evers Bed was appointed prosector. The official expedition artist was John James Wild. As well as Nares and Maclear, others that were part of the naval crew included Pelham Aldrich, George Granville Campbell and Andrew Francis Balfour (one of the sons of Scottish botanist John Hutton Balfour). Also among the officers was Thomas Henry Tizard, who had carried out important hydrographic observations on previous voyages. Though he was not among the civilian scientific staff, Tizard would later help write the official account of the expedition, and also become a Fellow of the Royal Society.

The original ship's complement included 21 officers and around 216 crew members. By the end of the voyage, this had been reduced to 144 due to deaths, desertions, personnel being left ashore due to illness, and planned departures.

Challenger reached Hong Kong in December 1874, at which point Nares and Aldrich left the ship to take part in the British Arctic Expedition. The new captain was Frank Tourle Thomson. The second-in-command, and the most senior officer present throughout the entire expedition, was Commander John Maclear. Willemoes-Suhm died and was buried at sea on the voyage to Tahiti. Lords Campbell and Balfour left the ship in Valparaíso, Chile, after being promoted.

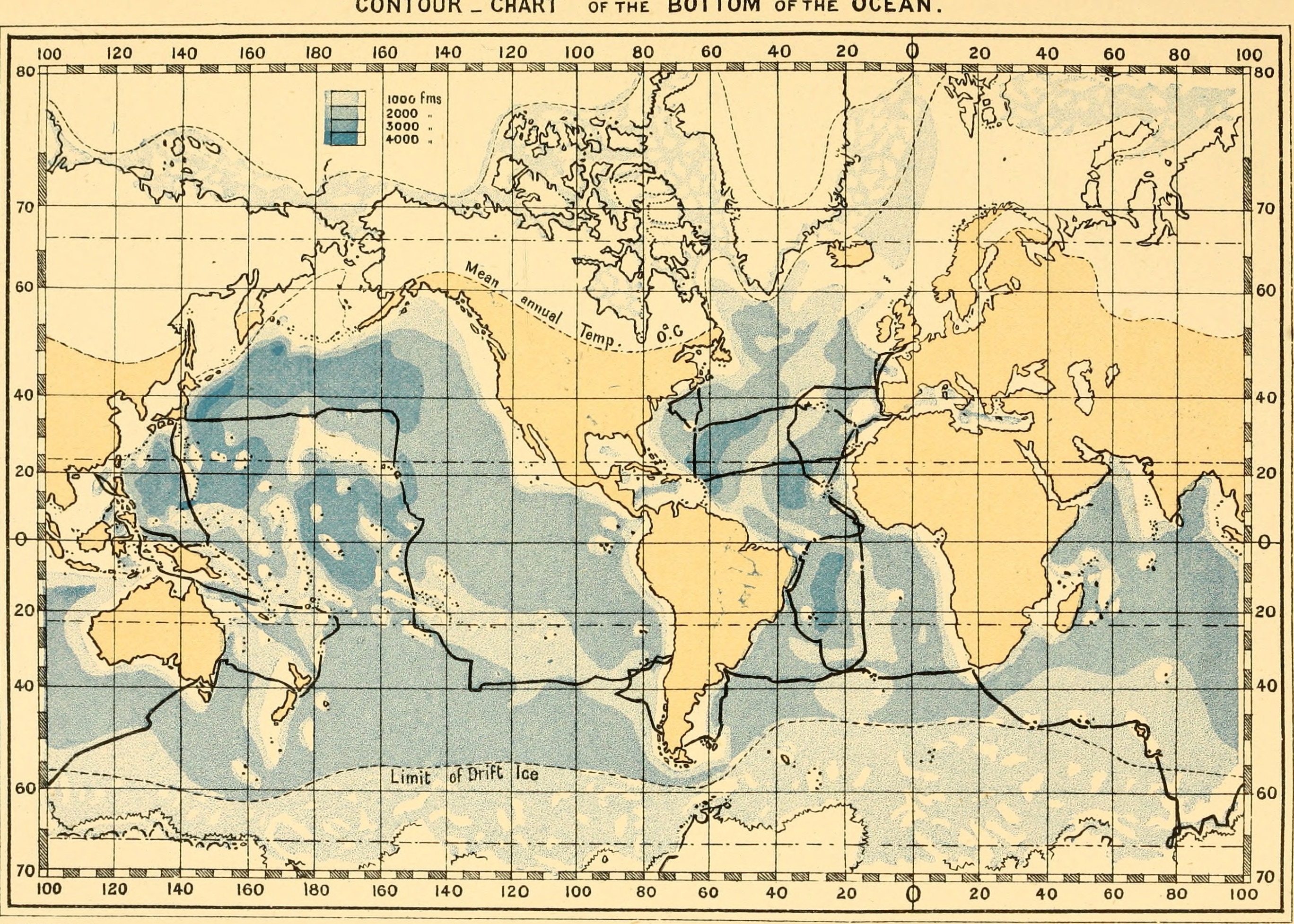
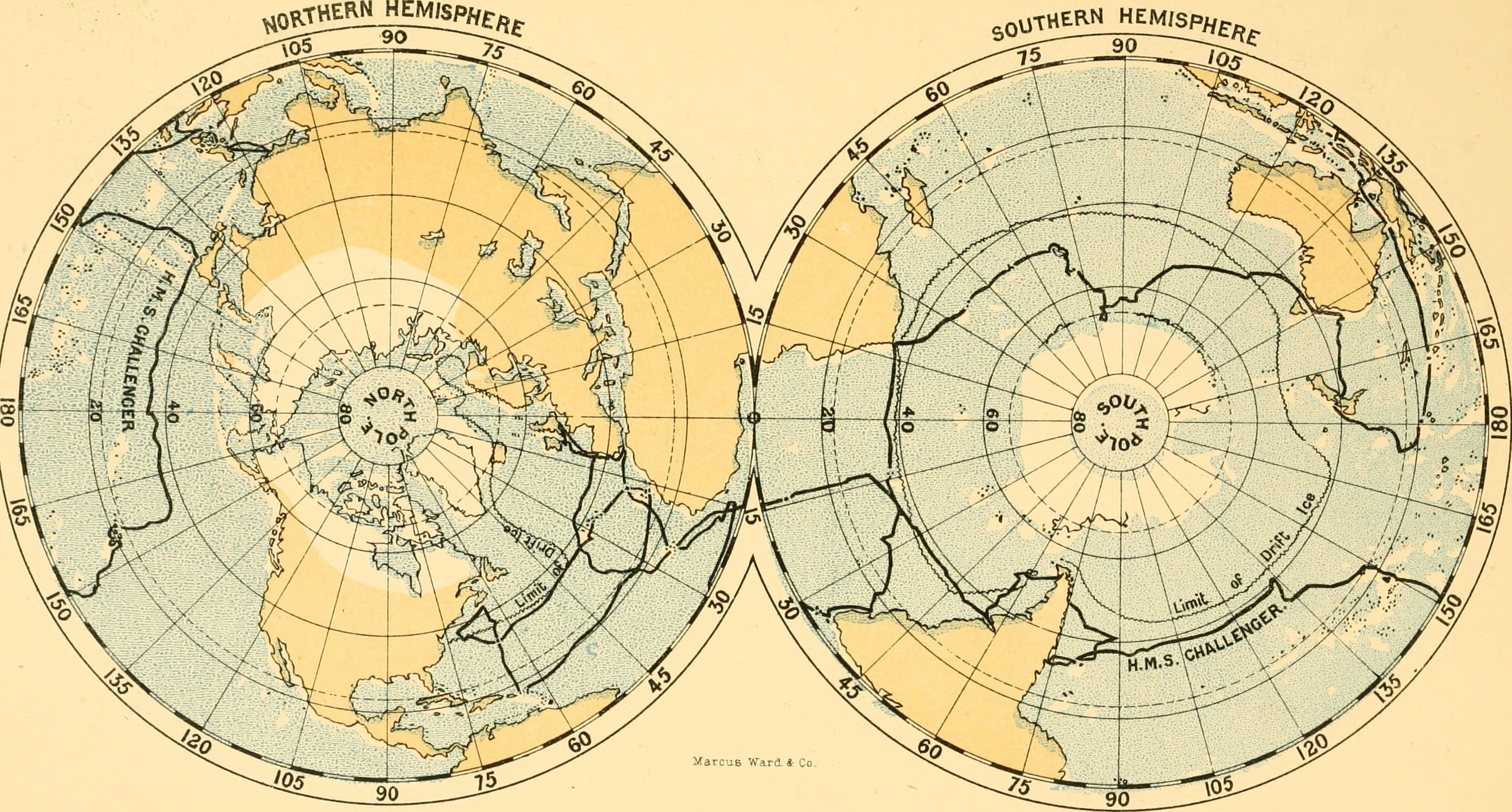
Maps of Challenger's route

The first leg of the expedition took the ship from Portsmouth (December 1872) south to Lisbon (January 1873) and then on to Gibraltar. The next stops were Madeira and the Canary Islands (both February 1873). The period from February to July 1873 was spent crossing the Atlantic westwards from the Canary Islands to the Virgin Islands, then heading north to the North Atlantic archipelago and Imperial fortress colony of Bermuda (home base of the North America and West Indies Station), east to the Azores, back to Madeira, and then south to the Cape Verde Islands. During this period, there was a detour in April and May 1873, sailing from Bermuda north to Halifax and back, crossing the Gulf Stream twice with the reverse journey crossing further to the east.

After leaving the Cape Verde Islands in August 1873, the expedition initially sailed south-east and then headed west to reach St Paul's Rocks. From here, the route went south across the equator to Fernando de Noronha during September 1873, and onwards that same month to Bahia (now called Salvador) in Brazil. The period from September to October 1873 was spent crossing the Atlantic from Bahia to the Cape of Good Hope, touching at Tristan da Cunha on the way.

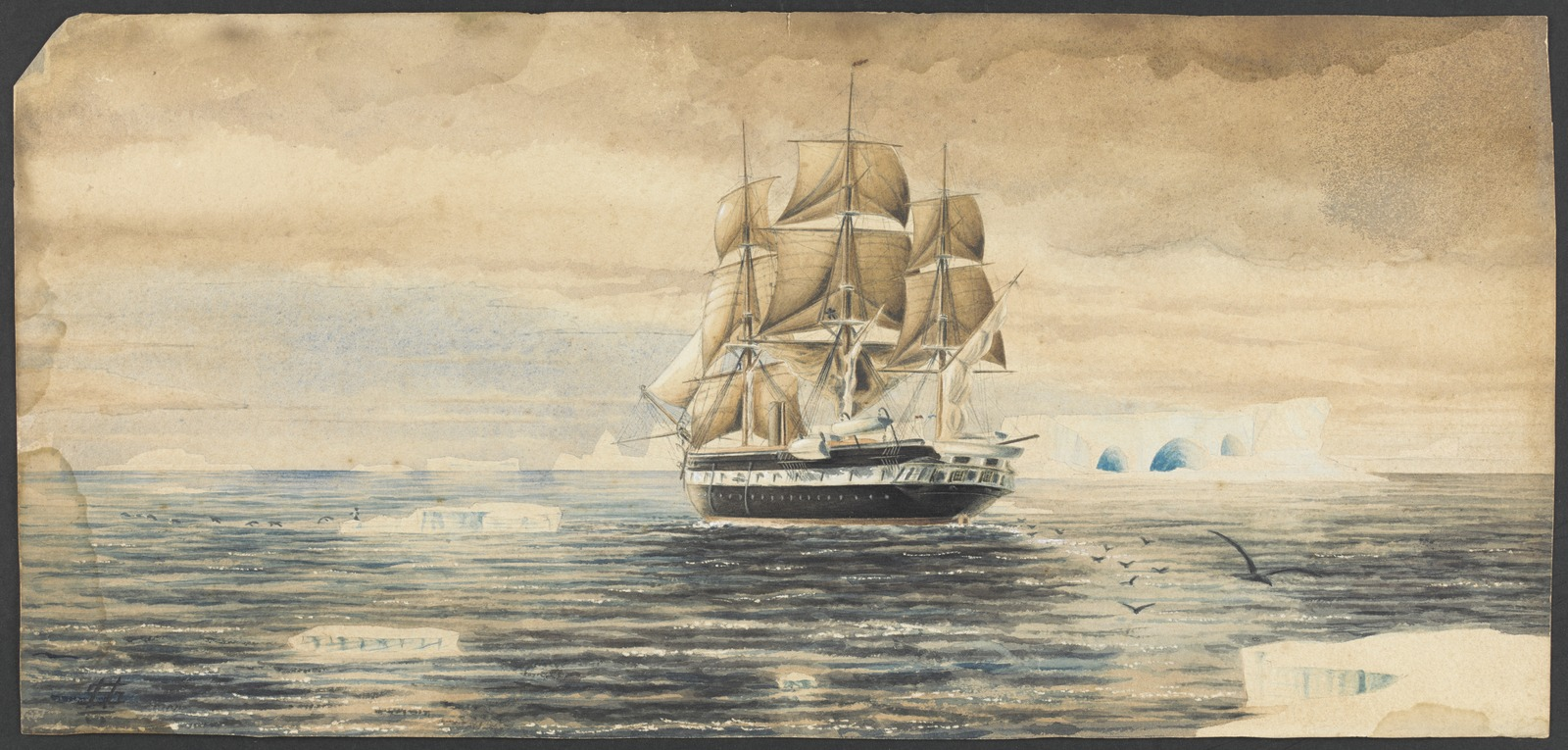
HMS Challenger in the Southern Ocean, drawn by crewman Sub-lieutenant Herbert Swire

December 1873 to February 1874 was spent sailing on a roughly south-eastern track from the Cape of Good Hope to the parallel of 60 degrees south. The islands visited during this period were the Prince Edward Islands, the Crozet Islands, the Kerguelen Islands and Heard Island. February 1874 was spent travelling south and then generally eastwards in the vicinity of the Antarctic Circle, with sightings of icebergs, pack ice and whales. The route then took the ship north-eastward and away from the ice regions in March 1874, with the expedition reaching Melbourne in Australia later that month. The journey eastward along the coast from Melbourne to Sydney took place in April 1874, passing by Wilsons Promontory and Cape Howe.

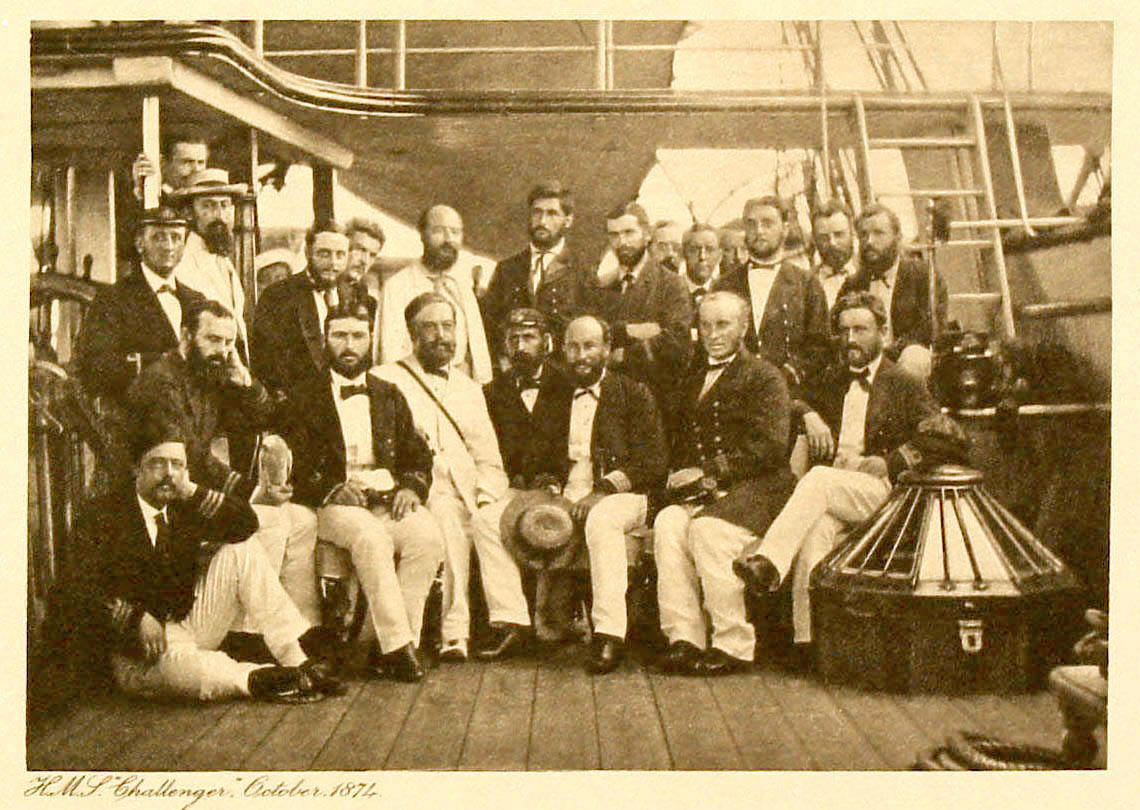
Expedition crew in 1874

When the voyage resumed in June 1874, the route went east from Sydney to Wellington in New Zealand, followed by a large loop north into the Pacific calling at Tonga and Fiji, and then back westward to Cape York in Australia by the end of August. The ship arrived in New Zealand in late June and left in early July. Before reaching Wellington (on New Zealand's North Island), brief stops were made at Port Hardy (on d'Urville Island) and Queen Charlotte Sound and Challenger passed through the Cook Strait to reach Wellington.

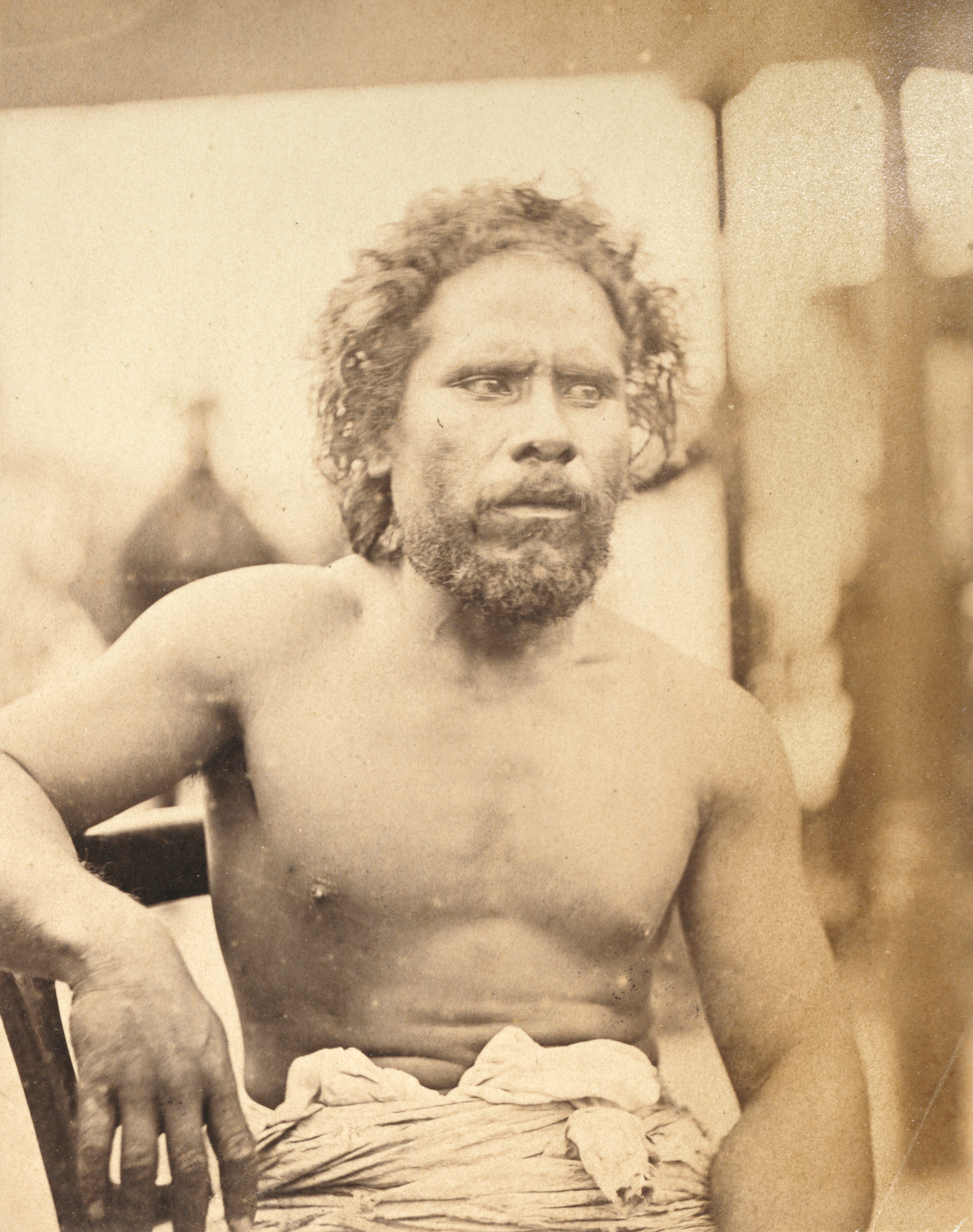
Amatabaulay, a Tongan pilot taken on board by the expedition in July 1874

The route from Wellington to Tonga went along the east coast of New Zealand's North Island, and then north and east into the open Pacific, passing by the Kermadec Islands en route to Tongatabu, the main island of the Tonga archipelago (then known as the Friendly Islands). The waters around the Fijian islands, a short distance to the north-west of Tonga, were surveyed during late July and early August 1874. The ship's course was then set westward, reaching Raine Island—on the outer edge of the Great Barrier Reef—at the end of August and thence arriving at Cape York, at the tip of Australia's Cape York Peninsula.

Over the following three months, from September to November 1874, the expedition visited several islands and island groups while sailing from Cape York to China and Hong Kong (then a British colony). The first part of the route passed north and west over the Arafura Sea, with New Guinea to the north-east and the Australian mainland to the south-west. The first islands visited were the Aru Islands, followed by the nearby Kai Islands. The ship then crossed the Banda Sea touching at the Banda Islands, to reach Amboina (Ambon Island) in October 1874, and then continuing to Ternate Island. At the time, all these islands were part of Netherlands East-Indies and are since 1949 part of Indonesia.

From Ternate, the route went north-westward towards the Philippines, passing east of Celebes (Sulawesi) into the Celebes Sea. The expedition called at Samboangan (Zamboanga) on Mindanao, and then Iloilo on the island of Panay, before navigating within the interior of the archipelago en route to the bay and harbour of Manila on the island of Luzon. The crossing north-westward from Manila to Hong Kong took place in November 1874.

After several weeks in Hong Kong, the expedition departed in early January 1875 to retrace their route south-east towards New Guinea. The first stop on this outward leg of the journey was Manila. From there, they continued on to Samboangan, but took a different route through the interior of the Philippines, this time touching at the island of Zebu. From Samboangan the ship diverged from the inward route, this time passing south of Mindanao—in early-February 1875.

Challenger then headed east into the open sea, before turning to the south-east and making landfall at Humboldt Bay (now Yos Sudarso Bay) on the north coast of New Guinea. By March 1875, the expedition had reached the Admiralty Islands north-east of New Guinea. The final stage of the voyage on this side of the Pacific was a long journey across the open ocean to the north, passing mostly west of the Caroline Islands and the Mariana Islands, discovering the Mariana Trench on 23 March 1875. Challenger reached port in Yokohama, Japan, in April 1875.

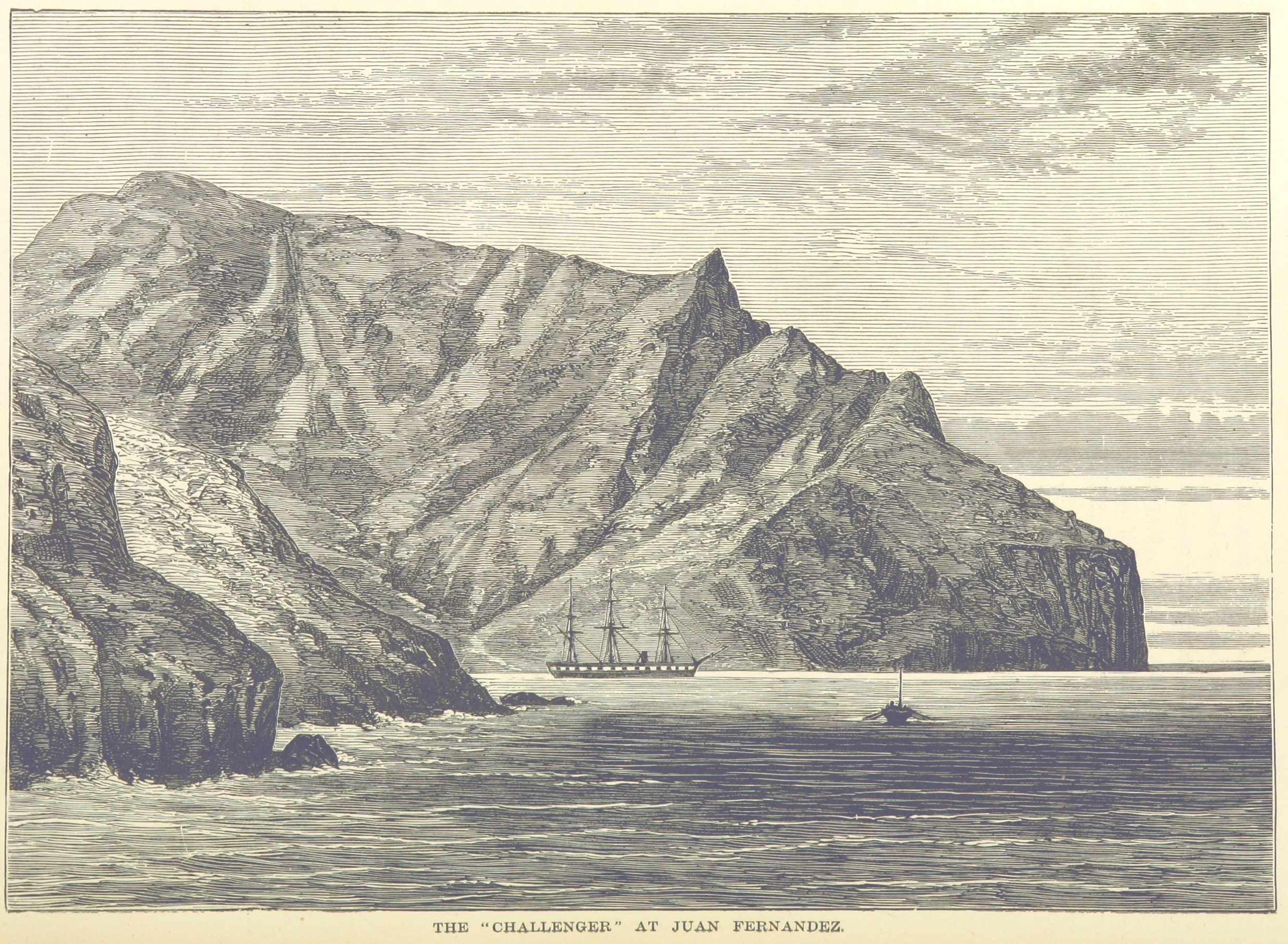
Challenger at the Juan Fernández Islands off Chile

Challenger departed Japan in mid-June 1875, heading east across the Pacific to a point due north of the Sandwich Islands (Hawaiʻi), and then turning south, making landfall at the end of July at Honolulu on the Hawaiian island of Oʻahu. A couple of weeks later, in mid-August, the ship departed south-eastward, anchoring at Hilo Bay off Hawaiʻi Island, before continuing to the south and reaching Tahiti in mid-September.

The expedition left Tahiti in early October, swinging to the west and south of the Tubuai Islands and then heading to the south-east before turning east towards the South American coast. The route touched at the Juan Fernández Islands in mid-November 1875, with Challenger reaching the port of Valparaíso in Chile a few days later. The next stage of the journey commenced the following month, with the route taking the ship south-westward back out into the Pacific, past the Juan Fernández Islands, before turning to the south-east and back towards South America, reaching Port Otway in the Gulf of Penas on 31 December 1875.

Most of January 1876 was spent navigating around the southern tip of South America, surveying and touching at many of the bays and islands of the Patagonian archipelago, the Strait of Magellan, and Tierra del Fuego. Locations visited here include Hale Cove, Gray Harbour, Port Grappler, Tom Bay, all in the vicinity of Wellington Island; Puerta Bueno, near Hanover Island; Isthmus Bay, near the Queen Adelaide Archipelago; and Port Churruca, near Santa Ines Island.

The final stops, before heading out into the Atlantic, were Port Famine, Sandy Point and Elizabeth Island. Challenger reached the Falkland Islands towards the end of January, calling at Port Stanley and then continuing northward, reaching Montevideo in Uruguay in mid-February 1876. The ship left Montevideo at the end of February, heading first due east and then due north, arriving at Ascension Island at the end of March 1876.

The period from early- to mid-April was spent sailing from Ascension Island to the Cape Verde Islands. From here, the route taken in late April and early May 1876 was a westward loop to the north out into the mid-Atlantic, eventually turning due east towards Europe to touch land at Vigo in Spain towards the end of May. The final stage of the voyage took the ship and its crew north-eastward from Vigo, skirting the Bay of Biscay to make landfall in England. Challenger returned to Spithead, Hampshire, on 24 May 1876, having spent 713 days out of the intervening 1,250 at sea.

== Scientific objectives ==
The Royal Society stated the voyage's scientific goals were:

1. To investigate the physical conditions of the deep sea in the great ocean basins—as far as the neighborhood of the Great Southern Ice Barrier—in regard to depth, temperature, circulation, specific gravity and penetration of light.
2. To determine the chemical composition of seawater at various depths from the surface to the bottom, the organic matter in solution and the particles in suspension.
3. To ascertain the physical and chemical character of deep-sea deposits and the sources of these deposits.
4. To investigate the distribution of organic life at different depths and on the deep seafloor.

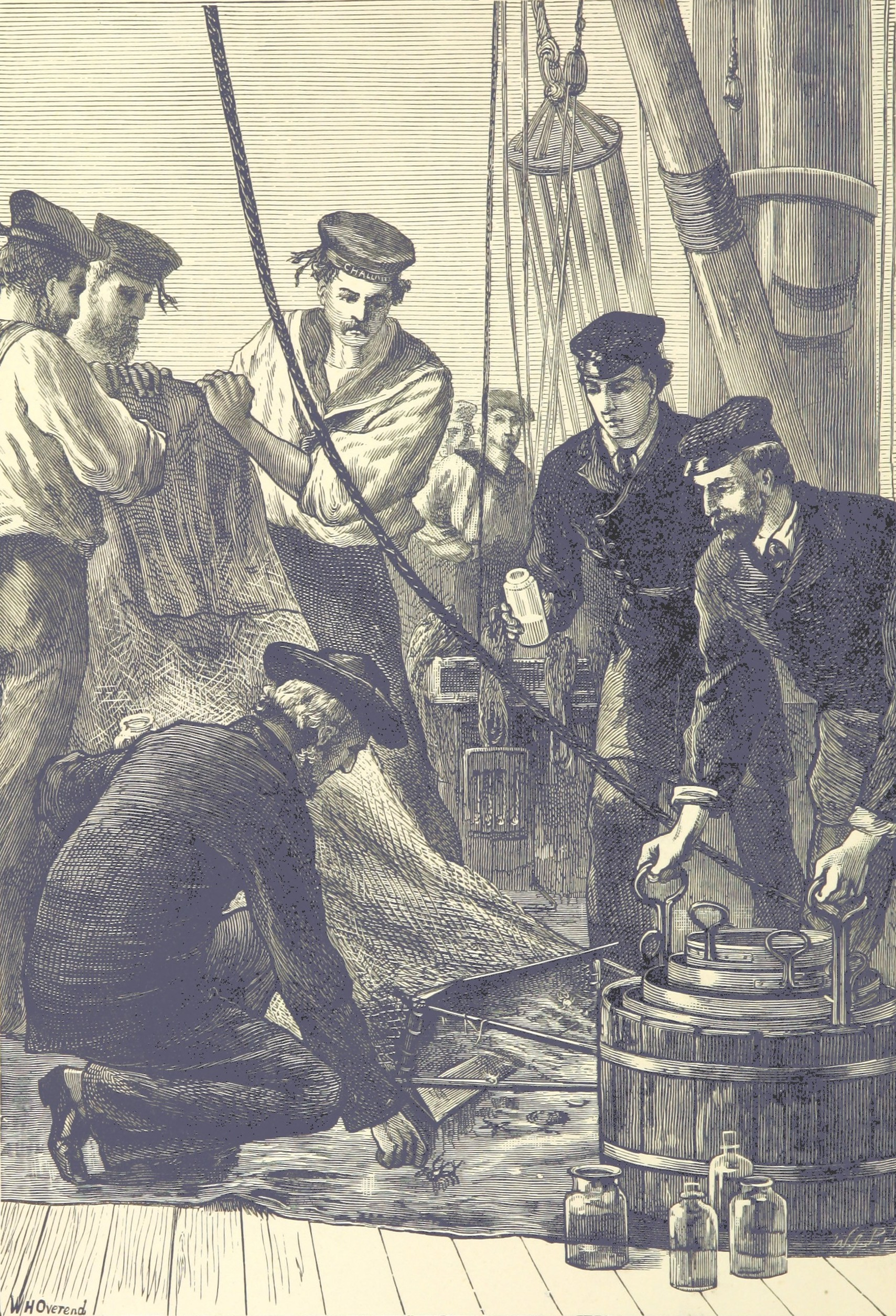
Examination of caught specimen

One of the goals of the physical measurements for HMS Challenger was to be able to verify the hypothesis put forward by Carpenter on the link between temperature mapping and global ocean circulation in order to provide some answers on the phenomena involved in the major oceanic mixing. This study is a continuation of the preliminary exploratory missions of HMS Lightning and HMS Porcupine. These results are important for Carpenter because his explanation differed from that of another renowned oceanographer at the time, the American Matthew Fontaine Maury. All these results of physical measurements were synthesized by John James Wild (i.e. the expedition's secretary-artist) in his doctoral thesis at the University of Zurich.

A second important issue concerning the collection of different kinds of physical data on the ocean floor was the laying of submarine telegraph cables. Many transoceanic cables were being laid in the 1860s and 1870s and their efficient laying and operation were matters of great strategic and commercial importance.

At each of the 360 stations the crew measured the bottom depth and temperature at different depths, observed weather and surface ocean conditions, and collected seafloor, water and biota samples. Challenger's crew used methods that were developed in prior small-scale expeditions to make observations. To measure depth, they would lower a line with a weight attached to it until it reached the sea floor. The line was marked in 25-fathom (150 ft; 46 m) intervals with flags denoting depth. Because of this, the depth measurements from Challenger were, at best, accurate to the nearest 25-fathom (150 ft; 46 m) demarcation. The sinker often had a small container attached to it that would allow for the collection of bottom sediment samples.

The crew used a variety of dredges and trawls to collect biological samples. The dredges consisted of metal nets attached to a wooden plank and dragged across the sea floor. Mop heads attached to the wooden plank would sweep across the sea floor and release organisms from the ocean bottom to be caught in the nets. Trawls were large metal nets towed behind the ship to collect organisms at different depths of water. Upon the retrieval of a dredge or trawl, Challenger crew would sort, rinse, and store the specimens for examination upon return. The specimens were often preserved in either brine or alcohol. Manganese nodules and sediment, which was later found to contain micrometeorites, was collected from the ocean floor.

The primary thermometer used throughout the Challenger expedition was the Miller–Casella thermometer, which contained two markers within a curved mercury tube to record the maximum and minimum temperature through which the instrument traveled. Several of these thermometers would be lowered at various depths for recording. However, this design assumed that the water closer to the surface of the ocean was always warmer than that below. During the voyage, Challenger's crew tested the reversing thermometer, which could measure temperature at specified depths. Afterwards, this type of thermometer was used extensively until the second half of the 20th century. After the return of Challenger, C.W. Thomson asked Peter Tait to solve a thorny and important question: to evaluate the error in the measurement of the temperature of deep waters caused by the high pressures to which the thermometers were subjected. Tait solved this question and continued his work with a more fundamental study on the compressibility of liquids leading to his famous Tait equation. William Dittmar of Glasgow University established the composition of seawater. Murray and Alphonse François Renard mapped oceanic sediments.

Thomson believed, as did many adherents of the then-recent theory of evolution, that the deep sea would be home to "living fossils" long extinct in shallower waters, examples of "missing links". They believed that the conditions of constant cold temperature, darkness, and lack of currents, waves, or seismic events provided such a stable environment that evolution would slow or stop entirely. Louis Agassiz believed that in the deeps "we should expect to find representatives of earlier geological periods." Thomas Huxley stated that he expected to see "zoological antiquities which in the tranquil and little changed depths of the ocean have escaped the causes of destruction at work in the shallows and represent the predominant population of a past age." Nothing of the sort came to pass, however; though a few organisms previously regarded as extinct were found and cataloged among the many new discoveries, the harvest was typical of what might be found in exploring any equivalent extent of new territory. Furthermore, in the process of preserving specimens in alcohol, Thomson and chemist John Young Buchanan realised that he had inadvertently debunked Huxley's prior report of Bathybius haeckelii, an acellular protoplasm covering the sea bottoms, which was purported to be the link between non-living matter and living cells. The net effect was a setback for the proponents of evolution.

== Challenger Deep ==
On 23 March 1875, at sample station number 225 located in the southwest Pacific Ocean between Guam and Palau, the crew recorded a sounding of 4,475 fathoms (26,850 ft; 8,184 m), which was confirmed by a second sounding. As shown by later expeditions using modern equipment, this area represents the southern end of the Mariana Trench and is one of the deepest known places on the ocean floor.

Modern soundings to 6,012 fathoms (36,070 ft; 10,994 m) have since been found near the site of Challenger's original sounding. Challenger's discovery of this depth was a key finding of the expedition in broadening oceanographic knowledge about the ocean's depth and extent; the depression, the Challenger Deep, now bears the name of the vessel and its successor, HMS Challenger II, which in 1951 identified a depth of 5,944 fathoms nearby. Thomas Gaskell, the Chief Scientist on HMS Challenger II, observed that the later measurement

was not more than 50 miles from the spot where the nineteenth-century Challenger found her deepest depth [...] and it may be thought fitting that a ship with the name Challenger should put the seal on the work of that great pioneering expedition of oceanography.

The expedition also verified the existence of the Mid-Atlantic Ridge extending from the southern hemisphere to the northern one.

== Legacy ==
Findings from the Challenger expedition continued to be published until 1895, 19 years after the completion of its journey, by the Challenger Office, Edinburgh, established for that purpose. The report contained 50 volumes and was over 29,500 pages in length. Specimens brought back by Challenger were distributed to the world's foremost experts for examination, which greatly increased the expenses and time required to finalize the report. The report and specimens were displayed at the British Natural History Museum from January to July, 2023. Some specimens, many of which were the first discovered of their kind, are still examined by scientists today.

A large number of scientists worked on categorizing the material brought back from the expedition including the paleontologist Gabriel Warton Lee. George Albert Boulenger, herpetologist at the Natural History Museum, named a species of lizard, Saproscincus challengeri, after Challenger.

Before the Challenger expedition, oceanography had been mainly speculative. As the first true oceanographic cruise, the Challenger expedition laid the groundwork for an entire academic and research discipline. "Challenger" was applied to such varied phenomena as the Challenger Society for Marine Science, the oceanographic and marine geological survey ship Glomar Challenger and the Space Shuttle Challenger.
