= Shale Niskin =

Shale Jack Niskin (June 18, 1926 – April 1988) was the inventor of the Niskin bottle, a device used for collecting water samples. He also founded General Oceanics, Inc. in 1966 and served as the company's first president. General Oceanics, based in North Miami, Florida, manufactures oceanographic and environmental monitoring equipment.
