= Nansen bottle =

Device for sampling water at depth

A Nansen bottle is a device for obtaining samples of water at a specific depth. It was originally designed in 1894 by Fridtjof Nansen and further developed by Shale Niskin in 1966 and is more commonly known as a Niskin bottle.

== Description ==
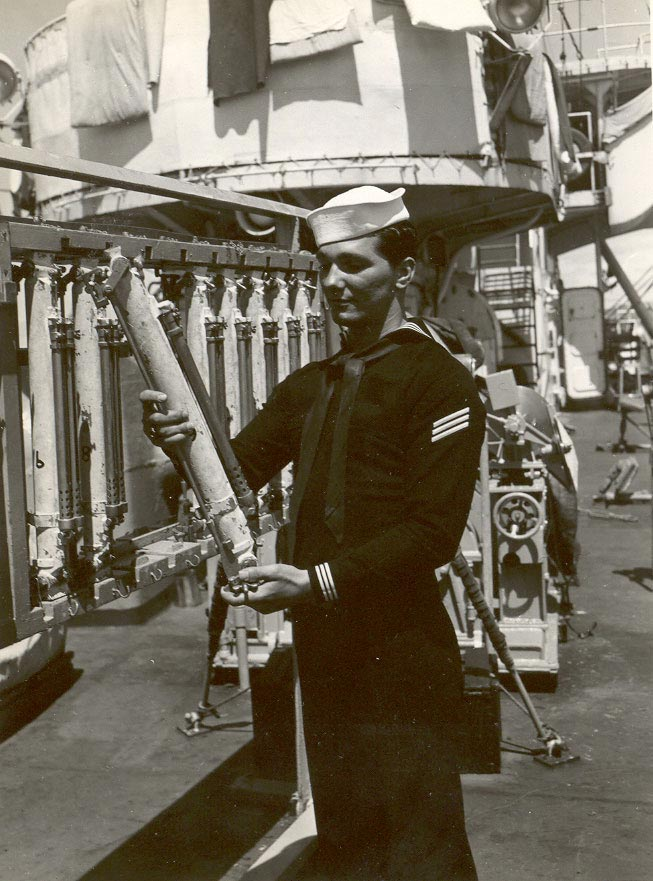
Sailor holding a Nansen bottle

The Nansen bottle (originally of brass) is designed for the capture of water deep in the ocean. It is essentially an open tube with a wide valve at each end connected together by a solid rod. A bottle is attached to the cable at its bottom using a clamping design and at its top by a tripping mechanism. A messenger weight is suspended below the clamping design.

A heavily-weighted cable is lowered from a ship and multiple bottles are attached at calculated intervals in order to place them at specific depths.

When the final bottle has been attached and lowered, the bottles are held at depth until the thermometers stabilize at temperature. A messenger weight is then sent down the cable to start a cascading triggering of the bottles. When the weight reaches the first bottle, the impact releases the tripping mechanism at the top, allowing the bottle to freely rotate from the bottom, ending in both valves closing, trapping the water sample inside. The messenger weight further impacts the bottom clamp, releasing the messenger weight suspended below it to travel to the next bottle in line. After all of the bottles are tripped, they are then retrieved by hauling in the cable.

The sea temperature at the water sampling depth is recorded by means of a reversing thermometer fixed to the Nansen bottle. This is a mercury thermometer with a constriction in its capillary tube which, when the thermometer is inverted, causes the thread to break and trap the mercury, fixing the temperature reading. Since water pressure at depth will compress the thermometer walls and affect the indicated temperature, the thermometer is protected by a rigid enclosure. A non-protected thermometer is paired with the protected one, and comparison of the two temperature readings allows both temperature and pressure at the sampling point to be determined.

== Niskin bottle ==
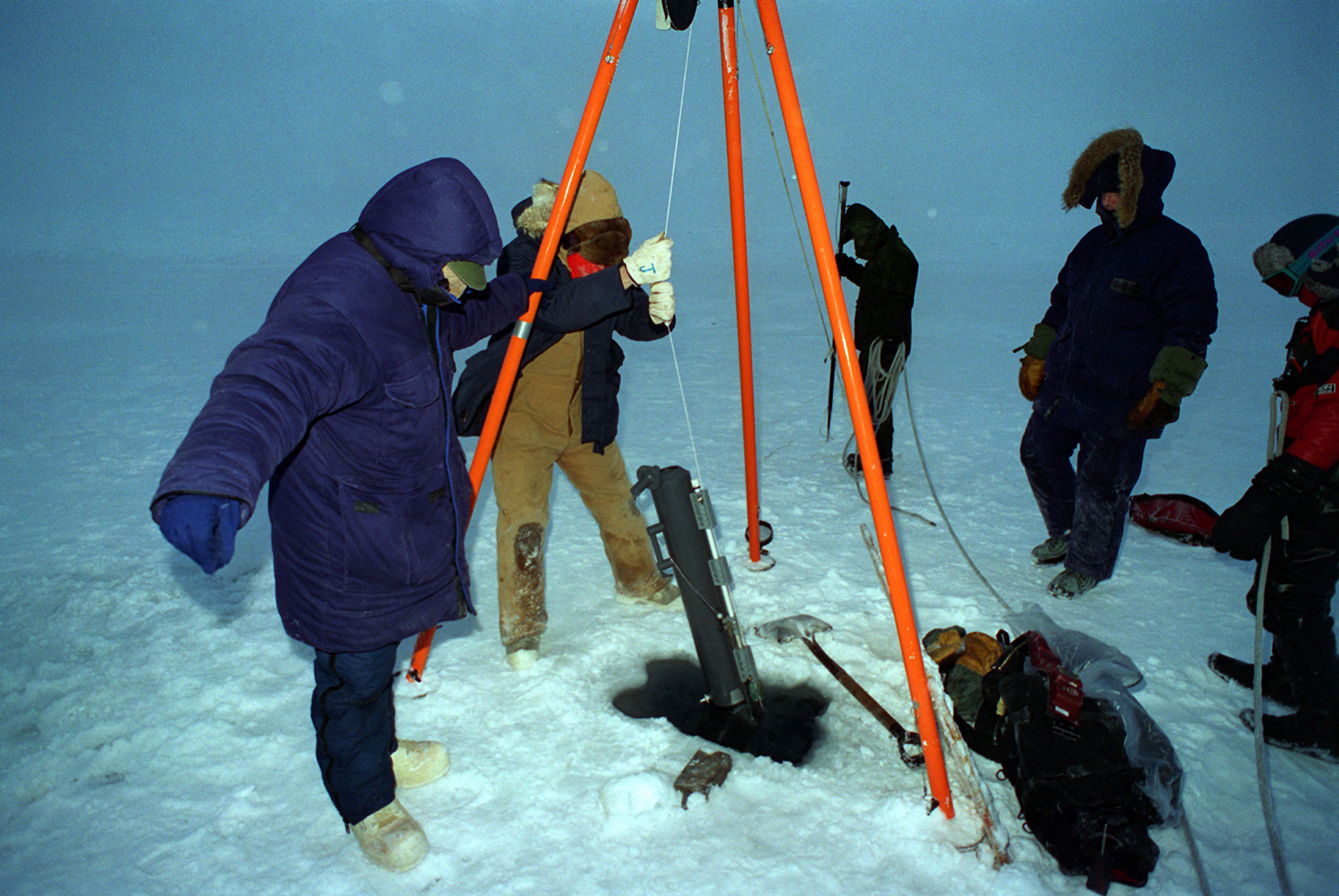
Niskin bottle about to be deployed

The Niskin bottle, patented by Shale Niskin in March 1966, is an improvement on the Nansen bottle. Instead of a metal bottle sealed at one end, the 'bottle' is a tube, usually plastic to minimize contamination of the sample, and open to the water at both ends. Each end is equipped with a cap which is either spring-loaded or tensioned by an elastic rope. The action of the messenger weight is to trip both caps to shut, sealing the tube. A reversing thermometer may also be carried on a frame fixed to the Niskin bottle. Since there is no rotation of the bottle to fix the temperature measurement, the thermometer has a separate spring-loaded rotating mechanism of its own tripped by the messenger weight.

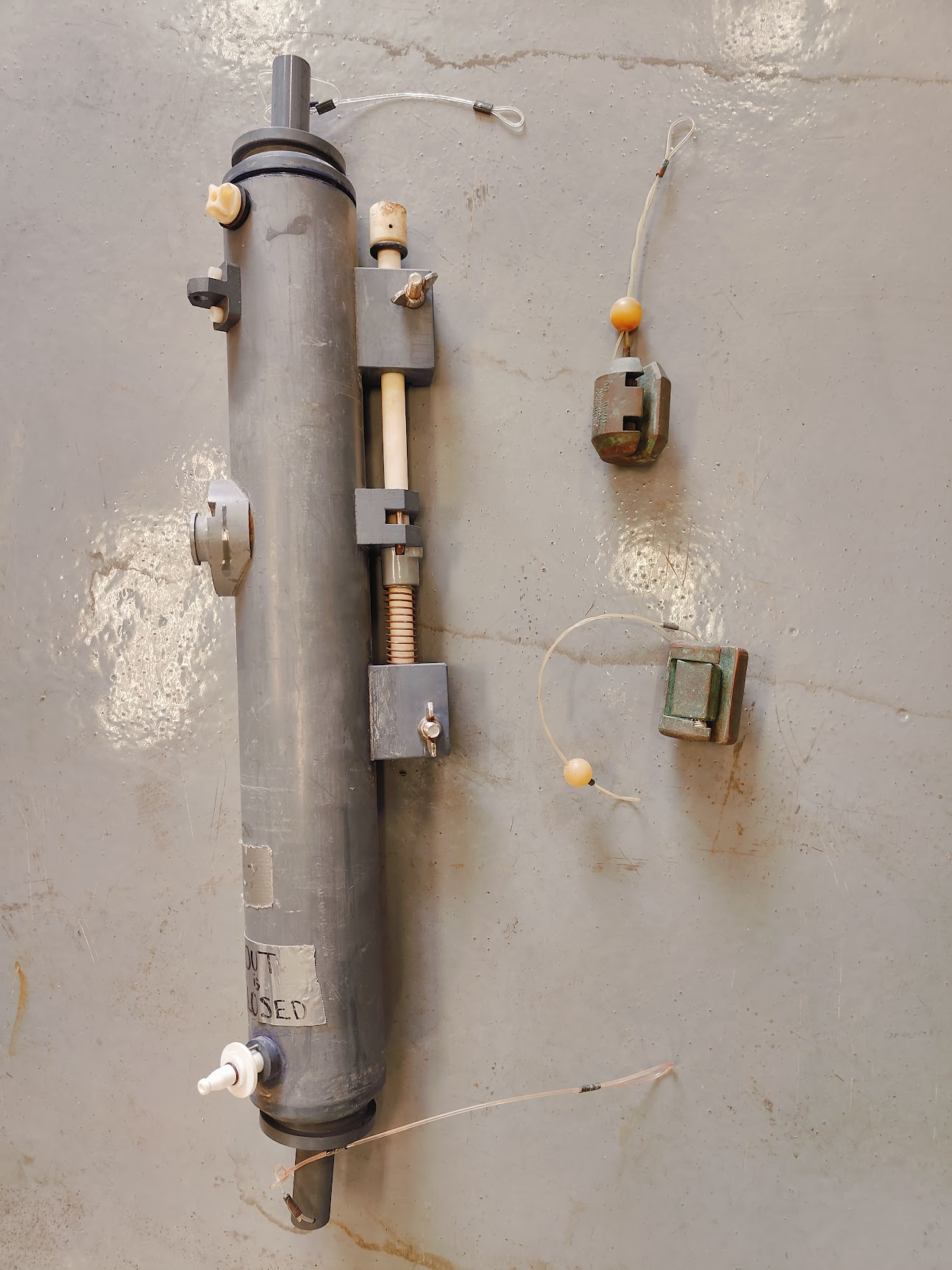
A Niskin bottle and messenger weights

A modern variation of the Niskin bottle uses actuated valves that may be either preset to trip at a specific depth detected by a pressure switch, or remotely controlled to do so via an electrical signal sent from the surface. This arrangement conveniently allows for a large number of Niskin bottles to be mounted together in a circular frame termed a rosette. As many as 36 bottles may be mounted on a single rosette. Thermistor temperature sensors are more commonly employed on Niskin bottle as they are more accurate than mercury thermometers.
