= Gabriel Warton Lee =

British geologist and palaeontologist

Gabriel Warton Lee (1880-1928) was a British geologist and palaeontologist. He was an authority on Bryozoa, a phylum of simple, aquatic invertebrate animals.

== Life ==
He was born in Switzerland on 8 December 1880 the son of Dr Arthur Bolles Lee. He was educated in Geneva to postgraduate level.

In 1905 he joined Sir John Murray as an official Geologist, working on the deciphering of the vast quantities of deep sea material brought back from the Challenger expedition. His work on Glauconite, alongside Leon William Collet, was especially noted. He also worked on the research of materials brought back from the Arctic by William Spiers Bruce. In 1907 he moved to be official Palaeontologist to HM Geological Survey under Ben Peach and John Horne. In 1922 he was promoted to Senior Geologist.

He was elected a Fellow of the Royal Society of Edinburgh in 1910. His proposers were John Horne, Ben Peach Ramsay Heatley Traquair and Robert Kidston.

He died of a heart attack in Edinburgh on 1 December 1928.

== Publications ==
- British Carboniferous Trepostomata (1911)
- The Economic Geology of the Central Coalfield of Scotland (1916)
- Iron Ores of Scotland (1920)
- The Mesozoic Rocks of Applecross (1920)
- Cannel Coals (1922)
- Tertiary Mull (1924)
- Ardnamurchan (1925)
- Pre-Tertiary Mull (1925)
