= List of Norwegian writers =

This is a list of Norwegian literature authors in the order of their year of birth. The century assignment is the period of their most significant works.

== 17th century ==
- Dorothe Engelbretsdotter (1634–1713)
- Petter Dass (1647–1707)

== 18th century ==
- Povel Juel (1673–1723)
- Ludvig Holberg (1684–1754)
- Christian Braunmann Tullin (1728–1765)
- Johan Herman Wessel (1742–1785)
- Johan Nordahl Brun (1745–1816)
- Johan Vibe (1746–1782)
- Edvard Storm (1749–1794)
- Jonas Rein (1760–1842)
- Jens Zetlitz (1761–1821)

== 19th century ==
- Henrik Anker Bjerregaard (1792–1842)
- Maurits Hansen (1794–1842)
- Nicoline Thaulow (1807–1885)
- Johan Sebastian Welhaven (1807–1873)
- Henrik Wergeland (1808–1845)
- Andreas Munch (1811–1884)
- Peter Christen Asbjørnsen (1812–1885)
- Jørgen Moe (1813–1882)
- Camilla Collett (1813–1895)
- Ivar Aasen (1813–1896)
- Aasmund Olavsson Vinje (1818–1870)
- Henrik Ibsen (1828–1906)
- Bjørnstjerne Bjørnson (1832–1910)
- Jonas Lie (1833–1908)
- Kristian Elster d.e. (1841–1881)
- Amalie Skram (1846–1905)
- Nordahl Rolfsen (1848–1928)
- Alexander Kielland (1849–1906)
- Arne Garborg (1851–1924)
- Christian Krohg (1852–1925)
- Jacob Breda Bull (1853–1930)
- Hans Jæger (1854–1910)
- Per Sivle (1857–1904)
- Gunnar Heiberg (1857–1929)
- Jens Tvedt (1857–1935)
- Knut Hamsun (1859–1952)
- Anders Hovden (1860–1943)
- Rasmus Løland (1861–1907)
- Rudolf Muus (1862–1935)
- Hans Aanrud (1863–1953)
- Nils Collett Vogt (1864–1937)
- Hans E. Kinck (1865–1926)
- Sigbjørn Obstfelder (1866–1900)
- Tryggve Andersen (1866–1920)
- Regine Normann (1867–1939)
- Thomas Krag (1868–1913)
- Bernt Lie (1868–1916)
- Hjalmar Christensen (1869–1925)
- Peter Egge (1869–1959)

== 20th century ==
- Andreas Jynge (1870–1955)
- Nils Kjær (1870–1924)
- Vilhelm Krag (1871–1933)
- Sven Moren (1871–1938)
- Johan Bojer (1872–1959)
- Nini Roll Anker (1873–1942)
- Gabriel Scott (1874–1958)
- Ragnhild Jølsen (1875–1908)
- Olav Duun (1876–1939)
- Kristofer Uppdal (1878–1961)
- Johan Falkberget (1879–1967)
- Cora Sandel (1880–1974)
- Oskar Braaten (1881–1929)
- Kristian Elster d.y. (1881–1947)
- Marie Hamsun (1881–1969)
- Sigrid Undset (1882–1949)
- Olav Aukrust (1883–1929)
- Olaf Benneche (1883–1931)
- Olaf Bull (1883–1933)
- Olav Nygard (1884–1924)
- Sven Elvestad (1884–1934)
- Olav Gullvåg (1885–1961)
- Alf Larsen (1885–1967)
- Magnhild Haalke (1885–1984)
- Herman Wildenvey (1886–1959)
- Tore Ørjasæter (1886–1968)
- Arthur Omre (1887–1967)
- Helge Krog (1889–1962)
- Aslaug Vaa (1889–1965)
- Arnulf Øverland (1889–1968)
- Sigurd Hoel (1890–1960)
- Inge Krokann (1893–1962)
- Trygve Gulbranssen (1894–1962)
- Mikkjel Fønhus (1894–1973)
- Ronald Fangen (1895–1946)
- Ingeborg Refling Hagen (1895–1989)
- Gunnar Reiss-Andersen (1896–1964)
- Astrid Tollefsen (1897–1973)
- Ola Viker (1897–1972)
- Tarjei Vesaas (1897–1970)
- Emil Boyson (1897–1979)
- Ernst Orvil (1898–1985)
- Odd Hølaas (1898–1968)
- Aksel Sandemose (1899–1965)
- Gunnar Larsen (1900–1958)
- Einar Skjæraasen (1900–1966)
- Gunnar Emil Garfors (1900–1979)
- Rudolf Nilsen (1901–1929)
- Lars Berg (1901–1969)
- Nordahl Grieg (1902–1943)
- Johan Borgen (1902–1979)
- Egil Rasmussen (1903–1964)
- Ragnvald Skrede (1904–1983)
- Inger Hagerup (1905–1985)
- Torborg Nedreaas (1906–1987)
- Kåre Fasting (1907–1983)
- Rolf Jacobsen (1907–1994)
- Halldis Moren Vesaas (1907–1995)
- Odd Bang-Hansen (1908–1984)
- Elisabeth Dored (1908–1972)
- Olav H. Hauge (1908–1994)
- Nils Johan Rud (1908–1993)
- Kristian Kristiansen (1909–1980)
- Claes Gill (1910–1973)
- Torolf Elster (1911–2006)
- Sigurd Evensmo (1912–1978)
- Thorbjørn Egner (1912–1990)
- Magli Elster (1912–1993)
- Odd Eidem (1913–1988)
- Alf Prøysen (1914–1970)
- Astrid Hjertenæs Andersen (1915–1985)
- Agnar Mykle (1915–1994)
- Carl Fredrik Engelstad (1915–1996)
- Tor Jonsson (1916–1951)
- Kåre Holt (1916–1997)
- Ebba Haslund (1917–2009)
- André Bjerke (1918–1985)
- Hans Børli (1918–1989)
- Johannes Heggland (1919–2008)
- Richard Herrmann (1919–2010)
- Anne-Catharina Vestly (1920–2008)
- Jens Bjørneboe (1920–1976)
- Kjell Aukrust (1920–2002)
- Ragnhild Magerøy (1920–2010)
- Gunvor Hofmo (1921–1995)
- Terje Stigen (1922–2010)
- Paal Brekke (1923–1993)
- Arnljot Eggen (1923–2009)
- Odd Abrahamsen (1924–2001)
- Finn Carling (1925–2004)
- Bergljot Hobæk Haff (1925–2016)
- Anker Rogstad (1925–1994)
- Marie Takvam (1926–2008)
- Vera Henriksen (1927–2016)
- Erling Christie (1928–1996)
- Gunnar Bull Gundersen (1929–1993)
- Kjell Askildsen (1929–2021)
- Gerd Grønvold Saue (1930-2022)
- Torfinn Haukås (1931–1993)
- Georg Johannesen (1931–2005)
- Finn Alnæs (1932–1991)
- Arvid Hanssen (1932–1998)
- Axel Jensen (1932–2003)
- Kolbein Falkeid (1933–2021)
- Johan Fredrik Grøgaard (1934–2025)
- Frid Ingulstad (1935–2026)
- Stein Mehren (1935–2017)
- Bjørg Vik (1935–2018)
- Øystein Lønn (1936–2022)
- Fredrik Skagen (1936–2017)
- Arild Nyquist (1937–2004)
- Karsten Alnæs (born 1938)
- Willy Martinussen (born 1938)
- Anne Karin Elstad (1938–2012)
- Hans Herbjørnsrud (1938–2023)
- Tor Obrestad (1938–2020)
- Tor Åge Bringsværd (1939–2025)
- Jan Erik Vold (born 1939)
- Einar Økland (born 1940)
- Gerd Brantenberg (born 1941)
- Knut Faldbakken (born 1941)
- Dag Solstad (1941–2025)
- Tove Lie (1942–2000)
- Herbjørg Wassmo (born 1942)
- Tor Edvin Dahl (born 1943)
- Torill Thorstad Hauger (1943–2014)
- Jon Bing (1944–2014)
- Kjartan Fløgstad (born 1944)
- Ingar Knudtsen (born 1944)
- Jon Michelet (1944–2018)
- Espen Haavardsholm (born 1945)
- Paal-Helge Haugen (born 1945)
- Liv Køltzow (1945–2025)
- Britt Karin Larsen (born 1945)
- Øyvind Myhre (born 1945)
- Klaus Hagerup (1946–2018)
- Per Jan Ingebrigtsen (born 1946)
- Svein Jarvoll (1946–2026)
- Gunnar Staalesen (born 1947)
- Toril Brekke (born 1949)
- Edvard Hoem (born 1949)
- Kaj Skagen (born 1949)
- Thor Sørheim (born 1949)
- Karin Sveen (born 1948)
- Alf R. Jacobsen (born 1950)
- Tomm Kristiansen (1950–2022)
- Steinar Løding (born 1950)
- Per Knutsen (1951–2022)
- Steinar Lem (1951–2009)
- Cecilie Løveid (born 1951)
- Mari Osmundsen (born 1951)
- Torild Wardenær (born 1951)
- Ketil Bjørnstad (born 1952)
- Jostein Gaarder (born 1952)
- Jo Eggen (born 1952)
- Ragnar Hovland (born 1952)
- Tove Nilsen (born 1952)
- Lars Amund Vaage (born 1952)
- Per Petterson (born 1952)
- Lars Saabye Christensen (born 1953)
- Tore Elias Hoel (born 1953)
- Jan Kjærstad (born 1953)
- Tor Ulven (1953–1995)
- Karin Fossum (born 1954)
- Roy Jacobsen (1954–2025)
- Torgeir Schjerven (born 1954)
- Thorvald Steen (born 1954)
- Terje Dragseth (born 1955)
- Ingvar Ambjørnsen (1956–2025)
- Olav Rune Ekeland Bastrup (born 1956)
- Rune Belsvik (born 1956)
- Jan Knudsen (born 1957)
- Unni Lindell (born 1957)
- Anne B. Ragde (born 1957)
- Finn Øglænd (born 1957)
- Pål H. Christiansen (born 1958)
- Torgrim Eggen (born 1958)
- Anne Holt (born 1958)
- Tom Egeland (born 1959)
- Jon Fosse (born 1959)
- Vigdis Hjorth (born 1959)
- Ove Røsbak (born 1959)
- Oystein Alme (born 1960)
- Frode Grytten (born 1960)
- Jo Nesbø (born 1960)
- Tomas Espedal (born 1961)
- Knut Nærum (born 1961)
- Gro Dahle (born 1962)
- Elin Brodin (born 1963)
- Geir Gulliksen (born 1963)
- Liv Heløe (born 1963)
- Terje Holtet Larsen (born 1963)
- Merethe Lindstrøm (born 1963)
- Levi Henriksen (born 1964)
- Nikolaj Frobenius (born 1965)
- Erik Fosnes Hansen (born 1965)
- Øyvind Rimbereid (born 1966)
- Linn Ullmann (born 1966)
- Trude Brænne Larssen (born 1967)
- Karl Ove Knausgård (born 1968)
- Erlend Loe (born 1969)
- Hanne Ørstavik (born 1969)

== 21st century ==
- Carl Frode Tiller (born 1970)
- Ari Behn (1972–2019)
- Bertrand Besigye (born 1972)
- Pedro Carmona-Alvarez (born 1972)
- Henrik H. Langeland (born 1972)
- Tore Renberg (born 1972)
- Matias Faldbakken (born 1973)
- Gunnhild Øyehaug (born 1975)
- Ingeborg Arvola (born 1975)
- Endre Lund Eriksen (born 1977)
- Mette Karlsvik (born 1978)
- Johan Harstad (born 1979)
- Helga Flatland (born 1984)
- Karoline Brændjord (born 1990)
- Bente Lyon
- Tore Skeie (born 1977)

== See also ==
- List of Norwegian women writers
