= Norwegian literature =

Norwegian literature

By category
Norwegian language
List of writers

Norwegian authors

Writers - Novelists
Playwrights - Poets
Essayists

Forms

Novel - Poetry - Plays

Genres

Science Fiction

Criticism & Awards

Literary theory - Critics
Literary Prizes

Most visited

Ibsen - Vesaas - Hamsun
Collett - Bjørnson
Wergeland - Dag Solstad
Jon Fosse - Sigrid Undset

Norway Portal
Literature Portal

Norwegian literature is literature composed in Norway or by Norwegian people. The history of Norwegian literature starts with the pagan Eddaic poems and skaldic verse of the 9th and 10th centuries with poets such as Bragi Boddason and Eyvindr Skáldaspillir. The arrival of Christianity around the year 1000 brought Norway into contact with European medieval learning, hagiography and history writing. Merged with native oral tradition and Icelandic influence, this was to flower into an active period of literature production in the late 12th and early 13th centuries. Major works of that period include Historia Norwegie, Thidreks saga and Konungs skuggsjá.

The period from the 14th century to the 19th is considered a Dark Age in the nation's literature though Norwegian-born writers such as Peder Claussøn Friis, Dorothe Engelbretsdatter and Ludvig Holberg contributed to the common literature of Denmark–Norway. With the advent of nationalism and the struggle for independence in the early 19th century, a new period of national literature emerged. In a flood of nationalistic romanticism, the great four emerged: Henrik Ibsen, Bjørnstjerne Bjørnson, Alexander Kielland, and Jonas Lie. The dramatist Henrik Wergeland was the most-influential author of the period while the later works of Henrik Ibsen were to earn Norway a key place in Western European literature.

Modernist literature was introduced to Norway through the literature of Knut Hamsun and Sigbjørn Obstfelder in the 1890s. In the 1930s Emil Boyson, Gunnar Larsen, Haakon Bugge Mahrt, Rolf Stenersen and Edith Øberg were among the Norwegian authors who experimented with prose modernism. The literature in the first years after the Second World War was characterized by a long series of documentary reports from people who had been in German custody, or who had participated in the resistance efforts during the occupation. In the 20th century notable Norwegian writers include the two Nobel Prize-winning authors, Knut Hamsun and Sigrid Undset. The period after 1965 represented a sharp expansion of market for Norwegian fiction and the 1970s produced both politicization and empowerment of Norwegian authors. The 1980s has been labeled the "fantasy decade" in Norwegian literature.

== Medieval poetry ==
The earliest preserved examples of Old Norse literature are the Eddic poems, the oldest of which may have been composed in early 9th century Norway drawing on the common Germanic tradition of alliterative verse. In the 9th century the first instances of skaldic poetry also appear with the skalds Bragi Boddason, Þjóðólfr of Hvinir and the court poets of Harald Fairhair. This tradition continued through the 10th century with the major Norwegian poet being Eyvindr skáldaspillir. By the late 10th century the tradition of skaldic verse had increasingly moved to Iceland and Norwegian rulers such as Eiríkr Hákonarson and St. Olaf employed mostly Icelandic poets.

== Medieval prose ==
In pagan times the runic alphabet was the only one used in Norway. The preserved inscriptions from that time are mostly short memorial dedications or magical formulas. One of the longest inscriptions is that on the 8th century Eggjum stone, containing cryptic religious or magical allusions. Around the years 1000 to 1030, Christianity became established in Norway, bringing with it the Latin alphabet. The oldest preserved Norwegian prose works are from the mid-12th century, the earliest are Latin hagiographical and historical texts such as Passio Olavi, Acta sanctorum in Selio, Historia Norwegie and Historia de Antiquitate Regum Norwagiensium. At the end of the 12th century, historical writing expanded to the vernacular with Ágrip af Nóregskonungasögum followed by the Legendary Saga of St. Olaf and Fagrskinna.

Medieval Norwegian literature is closely tied with medieval Icelandic literature, and together, they are considered Old Norse literature. The greatest Norse author of the 13th century was the Icelander Snorri Sturluson. He recorded Norse mythology in the form of the Prose Edda, a book of poetic language providing an important understanding of Norse culture prior to Christianity. He was also the author of the Heimskringla, a detailed history of the Norwegian kings that begins in the legendary Ynglinga saga and continues to document much of early Norwegian history.

The period of common Old Norse literature continued up through the 13th century with Norwegian contributions such as Thidreks saga and Konungs skuggsjá but by the 14th century saga writing was no longer cultivated in Norway and Icelandic literature became increasingly isolated.

== "Four Hundred Years of Darkness" ==
Norwegian literature was virtually nonexistent during the period of the Scandinavian Union and the subsequent Dano-Norwegian union (1387–1814). Ibsen characterized this period as "Four Hundred Years of Darkness". During the period of union with Denmark, Danish replaced Norwegian. The university and cultural center of Denmark–Norway was Copenhagen, where young men went to study.

The reformation was imposed on Norway in 1537 and the Dano-Norwegian rulers used it to also impose Danish culture; this was effected through the pulpit as well as through written records, as pastors were trained in Copenhagen. Thus, written Norwegian became closely related to Danish, causing the literature to become essentially Danish. Geble Pedersson (c.1490–1557) was the first Lutheran Bishop of Bergen and a man of broad humanistic views; his adopted son, Absalon Pederssøn Beyer (1528–1575), followed in his footsteps as a humanist and a nationalist, writing an important historical work, Concerning the Kingdom of Norway (1567). Peder Claussøn Friis (1545–1615) was also a humanist who both revived the Heimskringla by translating it into the language of the period and wrote the first natural history of Norway as well as an important topographic study of Norway.

The seventeenth century was a period of meager literary activity in Norway, but there were significant contributions. Petter Dass (1647–1707) wrote Nordlands Trompet (The Trumpet of Nordland) which described in graphic verse the landscape, mode of life, conditions and character of the northern Norwegian people. Two other authors merit mention. Dorothe Engelbretsdotter (1634–1713), was Norway's first recognized woman author who wrote powerful religious poetry. Her first work, Siælens Sang-offer, was published in 1678. Taare-Offer was her second collected works and was published for the first time in 1685. Another gifted poet was Anders Arrebo who translated the Psalms into Norwegian and composed the creation poem, Hexaemeron.

Norway also contributed significantly to the joint literature of Denmark–Norway. One of the first names in Danish literature, Peder Claussøn Friis (1545–1614), was Norwegian-born. Other important Norwegian by birth 'Danish' authors of the period included Ludvig Holberg (Bergen, 1684–1754), Christian Tullin (Christiania, 1728–1765), and Johan Herman Wessel (1742–1785).

== Rebirth ==
Two major events precipitated a major resurgence in Norwegian literature. In 1811, a Norwegian university was established in Christiania (later renamed Oslo). Seized by the spirit of revolution following the American and French Revolutions, as well as bridling as a result of the forced separation from Denmark and subordination to Sweden subsequent to the Napoleonic wars, Norwegians signed their first constitution in 1814. Virtually immediately, the cultural backwater that was Norway brought forth a series of strong authors recognized first in Scandinavia, and then worldwide.

Henrik Wergeland is generally recognized as the father of a new Norwegian literature. The enthusiastic nationalism of Wergeland and his young following brought conflict with the establishment, which was unwilling to accept everything as good, simply because it was Norwegian.

This period also saw collection of Norwegian folk tales by Peter Asbjørnsen and Bishop Jørgen Moe. This collection, which paralleled those by the Brothers Grimm in Germany and Hans Christian Andersen in Denmark, captured an important overview of the folk culture of the mountains and fjords.

At least as important in the creation of a Norwegian literature was the effort to introduce a pure Norwegian language, based on the dialects spoken in the areas more isolated from capital. The genius of Ivar Aasen (1813–1898) was at the heart of this effort. Aasen, a self-taught linguistic scholar and philologist, documented a written grammar and dictionary for the spoken Norwegian folk language, which became Nynorsk (New Norwegian) – the "speech of the country" as opposed to the official language largely imported from Denmark. Nynorsk is one of the two official written norms of the Norwegian language to this day.

== National Romantic Period ==
By the late 19th century, in a flood of nationalistic romanticism, the great four emerged: Henrik Ibsen, Bjørnstjerne Bjørnson, Alexander Kielland, and Jonas Lie. A unity of purpose pervades the whole period, creation of a national culture based on the almost forgotten and certainly neglected past, as well as celebration of the bondekultur or Norwegian farm culture. The realism of Kielland (e.g., Skipper Worse) gave way to the romantic and nationalistic spirit which swept Europe and rekindled the Norwegian interest in their glorious Viking past (e.g., Ibsen's The Vikings at Helgeland), the struggles of the Middle Ages (e.g., Ibsen's Lady Inger of Østeraad), peasant stories (e.g., Bjørnson's A Happy Boy) and the wonders of myths and folks tales of the mountains (e.g., Ibsen's Peer Gynt) and the sea (e.g., Lie's The Visionary).

== Transition to Realism ==
Although a strong contributor to early Norwegian romanticism, Henrik Ibsen is perhaps best known as an influential Norwegian playwright who was largely responsible for the popularity of modern realistic drama in Europe, with plays like The Wild Duck and A Doll's House. In this, he built on a theme first evident in Norway with plays like Bjørnson's En fallit (A Bankruptcy).

== Emigration Literature ==
Although a side note to the mainstream of Norwegian literature, the literature which documents the experience of Norwegian emigrants to America is as important as the Norwegian immigrants became to the growing America of the 19th century. Three authors are recognized in this genre; Ole Rølvaag wrote about immigrants, while Johan Bojer and Ingeborg Refling Hagen wrote about emigrants. Ole E. Rølvaag, who immigrated to America, experienced life in the prairies, and rose to become professor of Norwegian at St. Olaf College in Northfield, Minnesota, provided a strong record of the joys and pains of the immigrant in adapting to the harsh realities of and carving out a new life in a wild new country. Norwegian author Johan Bojer provided a mirror image, depicting the struggles and processes which led to the decisions to emigrate. Ingeborg Refling Hagen, having two brothers and a sister in the United States contemplated the emigrant's longing for home and their harsh struggle "over there" in a known collection of emigrant poems from 1935.

== Modernism in Norway ==
Modernist literature was introduced to Norway through the literature of Knut Hamsun and Sigbjørn Obstfelder in the 1890s. In the 1930s, Emil Boyson, Gunnar Larsen, Haakon Bugge Mahrt, Rolf Stenersen and Edith Øberg were among the Norwegian authors who experimented with prose modernism. The books of the 1930s did not receive the same recognition as modernist works after the war. In 1947, Tarjei Vesaas published a poetry collection, Leiken og lynet, that led to major debate about the shape and rhythm for Norwegian poetry. This evolved further in the 1950s. Rolf Jacobsen achieved recognition as a poet of modernistic style after the war. Kristofer Uppdal was also recognized for his work.

== The Twentieth Century ==
After the death of the great four and Amalie Skram, a new period of Norwegian literature took place. The year 1905, when Norway was free from the union with Sweden, marks a new period in the history of Norwegian literature. In the 20th century, three Norwegian novelists won the Nobel Prize in Literature. The first was Bjørnstjerne Bjørnson, whose prize reflected work of the previous century. The second was awarded to Knut Hamsun for the idealistic novel Markens Grøde (Growth of the Soil, 1917) in 1920. The third was Sigrid Undset for the trilogy of Kristin Lavransdatter and the two books of Olav Audunssøn, in 1927.

Knut Hamsun was especially criticized because of his sympathy for Nasjonal Samling, a Norwegian Nazi-party, during the Second World War.

Other important Norwegian writers include: Trygve Gulbranssen, Jens Bjørneboe, Agnar Mykle, Olav Duun, Cora Sandel, Kjartan Fløgstad, Arne Garborg, Aksel Sandemose, Tarjei Vesaas, Lars Saabye Christensen, Kjell Askildsen, Johan Borgen, Dag Solstad, Herbjørg Wassmo, Jon Fosse, Hans Herbjørnsrud, Jan Erik Vold, Roy Jacobsen, Bergljot Hobæk Haff, Hans E. Kinck, Olav H. Hauge, Rolf Jacobsen, Gunvor Hofmo, Arnulf Øverland, Sigbjørn Obstfelder, Olaf Bull, Aasmund Olavsson Vinje, Tor Ulven, Torborg Nedreaas, Stein Mehren, Jan Kjærstad, Georg Johannesen, Kristofer Uppdal, Aslaug Vaa, Halldis Moren Vesaas, Sigurd Hoel, Johan Falkberget, Hans Børli and Axel Jensen.

=== The Post-war Period (1945–1965) ===
The literature in the first years after the Second World War was characterized by a long series of documentary reports from people who had been in German custody, or who had participated in the resistance efforts during the occupation. The most famous among these were Lise Børsums's Fange i Ravensbrück, Odd Nansen's Fra dag til dag (From Day to Day) and the posthumously published Petter Moens dagbok (Petter Moen's diary). Some years later, biographies of heroes of resistance, such as Fridtjof Sælen's Shetlands-Larsen, about Leif Andreas Larsen, and David Armin Howarth's Ni liv. Historien om Jan Baalsrud (Nine Lives – the story of Jan Baalsrud), became major publishing successes.

Fiction of the period also centered on the war. Sigurd Evensmo's Englandsfarere (published in English as "A Boat for England") about a group of resistance fighters who are captured. Tarjei Vesaas symbolically addressed the war experience in Huset i mørkret (The House in the Dark). A significant portion of the post-war literature was concerned with the question of why some remained good Norwegian patriots while others, seemingly ordinary people, served the enemy. Examples of this include Sigurd Hoel's Møte ved milepelen from 1947, Kåre Holt's Det store veiskillet (The Big Fork) from 1949 and Aksel Sandemose's Varulven (The Werewolf) from 1958, which provide psychological explanations for collaboration.

Poetry written during the war, which had either been broadcast from London or had circulated illegally, was published as collections in the spring of 1945, and enjoyed a popularity that Norwegian poetry has not seen before or since. In particular Arnulf Øverland's Vi overlever alt (We survive everything) and Nordahl Grieg's Friheten (Freedom) were well received. Some of those who were young during the war found that the traditional lyrical forms were insufficient to express horrors of war, atomic bombs and the emerging Cold War. Gunvor Hofmo, who was personally affected by the war, came with the remarkable collections Jeg vil hjem til menneskene (I Want to Go Home to the People) and Fra en annen virkelighet (From an Alternate Reality).

Modernism appeared on a broad front in the Norwegian poetry of the 1950s. It impacted the lyrics produced by Tarjei Vesaas, Ernst Orvil, Astrid Tollefsen and Olav H. Hauge. Among the younger poets, such as Astrid Hjertenæs Andersen, Paal Brekke, Hans Børli, Harald Sverdrup and Marie Takvam, free verse was the preferred form. Paal Brekke was modernism's foremost advocate against traditionalists – such as Arnulf Øverland and André Bjerke – in a wide-ranging debate about poetic forms which is recognized as the speaking-in-tongues debate. Georg Johannesen's first publication Dikt (Poetry) in 1959 introduced a new interest in political and social values, that had not been particularly evident in the 1950s. At the same time, the well-established poet, Rolf Jacobsen, espoused a more critical attitude to the consumer mentality and environmental destruction.

In prose, first and foremost it was Jens Bjørneboe who led the attack on the establishment in the 1950s. In Jonas and Den onde hyrde (The Evil Shepherd) he attacks the school and prison systems, arguing that there the government shows its authoritarian aspects particularly clearly. One of the highlights of 1950s prose literature is Johan Borgen's Lillelord trilogy. Borgen' work is characterized by an experimental prose-writing style, which can be seen in several short story collections as well as the experimental novel Jeg (I) from 1959. Another highlight of 1950s literature was two controversial novels by Agnar Mykle's about Ask Burlefot: Lasso rundt fru Luna (published in English as "Lasso Around The Moon") and Sangen om den røde rubin (The Song of the Red Ruby). But as a result of legal intervention against the latter book, the pressure of the court case and surrounding controversy left Mykle a reclusive who published little thereafter. Axel Jensen was another fresh, new voice in the 1950s. In his debut novels Ikaros and Line the young protagonist comes to terms with nonsocialistic members of the Social Democratic welfare state. Jensen also introduced a new theme in Norwegian literature with the publication of Epp in 1965; this novel dealt with a future dystopia.

Besides Johan Borgen, Tarjei Vesaas and Torborg Nedreaas also achieved recognition as excellent short story writers. In 1953, Kjell Askildsen debuted with the short story collection Heretter følger jeg deg helt hjem (From now on I'll walk you all the way home). He has since remained at short prose genre, and is today considered one of Norwegian literature's finest short story writers.

=== Political awareness and social realism (1965–1980) ===
The period after 1965 represented a sharp expansion of market for Norwegian fiction. In 1965, Norway instituted a policy for purchasing new literature. The state committed to purchase 1000 copies of each new title of Norwegian literature (conditioned on it meeting minimum standards). These were distributed among the country's libraries. This, combined with the creation of the book club Bokklubben Nye Bøker (New Books) in 1976 produced increased vitality in the country's literary production.

The 1970s produced both politicization and empowerment of Norwegian authors as a group – as well as intellectuals in general. The Norwegian Authors' Union became an arena for political struggle as well as the struggle for academic authors' rights. At one point the author's union split into two camps. Around the country the authors organized themselves in the regional author's organizations, and started a number of literary journals, in which contributions by amateur writers were welcomed.

Profil would eventually become the most-notable literary magazine. From 1965, it published the work of a number of young writers who would put their distinct mark on the literature of the period. The Profil goal was to bring Norwegian literature abreast of European literature in general. To achieve this, they rebelled against the traditional psychological novel development. The question of the true identify for the modern state was core. Dag Solstad contributed significantly to this late-1960s figures modernism through his articles, essays and literary works.

Poetry already exhibited a modernist style, which was prevalent through the 1950s and early 1960s. Traditionalists who still wrote in fixed stanza forms were out of favor. The younger poets targeted replacing the 1950s-style symbolism, and Jan Erik Vold was at the forefront of this insurgency. Profil poetry introduced a new simplicity, concretism, and use of everyday language. Paal Brekke was particularly noted for promoting modern European poetry, both as poet and critic. He argued for a renewal of Norwegian poetry, and spread knowledge of foreign literature through translations of English modernist writers like T.S.Eliot. In the mid-1950s, Brekke participated in the debate on lyrical form, and opposed André Bjerke and Arnulf Øverland in the so-called Glossolalia debate. Among the established lyrists, Olav H. Hauge transitioned to modernistic and concretist poetry and enjoyed a renaissance, especially with his collection entitled Dropar in austavind, which inspired other, younger Norwegian poets, such as Jan Erik Vold.

After a short period the Profil group went separate routes, as authors such as Dag Solstad, Espen Haavardsholm, and Tor Obrestad turned to the newly formed party Workers' Communist Party (Arbeidernes kommunistparti or AKP), and become involved in formulating a new political program that based on the view that literature should serve the working people and their uprising against capitalism. Arild Asnes Solstad's 1970 is a key novel to understanding the desire of the modern intellectual to connect with something larger and more realistic – the working people and a cause.

There were few AKP-authors, yet they managed to set a major part of the agenda for Norwegian fiction through much of the 1970s. Some authors began to write novels and poems in a language targeted so that people could recognize themselves, often known as social realism literature. Well-known works in this genre include Solstad's 25. septemberplassen, Obrestad's Sauda! Streik! and Haavardsholm's Historiens kraftlinjer.

Even though a minority wrote AKP-themed literature, there was a general willingness of the larger community of authors to support this literary focus. Besides the class struggle, there were two areas that were subject of serious literature: feminism and the struggle against the concentration of governmental power into a centralized government.

The term feminist literature or woman's literature was shifting during this period. While some believed that a special term for literature written for women by women about women's experiences were necessary, others were concerned that feminist literature served to place the female writers and readers outside the community, in an isolated cycle. Notwithstanding the debate, important contributions came from new, female authors about women unsatisfactory role in the family and in society. Liv Køltzow's Hvem bestemmer over Liv og Unni? (Who decides for Liv and Unni?) is central to understanding the new woman's literature. Bjørg Vik contributed a long series of short story collections and the play To akter for fem kvinner (Two acts for five women). Both Køltzow's and Vik's work stayed with the realistic tradition. Later Cecilie Løveid and Eldrid Lunden created work with a more rebellious language representing a fresh genre of experimental work. Løveid's work is notably committed to finding a new language for a new female role.

=== Beyond social realism (1980–2000) ===
The decade of the 1980s was in many ways a response to the social realism in 1970s literature. In 1983, Kaj Skagen published a polemical-philosophical treatise titled Bazarovs barn ("Bazarov's Children", alluding to the Russian fictional nihilist Eugene Bazarov), which reconciled the role of authors who had been on the periphery in the 1970s. Skagen advocated for a more individual-oriented and idealistic literature. Although it is uncertain whether this book created or simplify reflected the transition, many of the 1970s authors shifted in new directions during the 1980s. Dag Solstad published two novels which were retrospectives on the Workers' Communist Party. Espen Haavardsholm wrote a novel titled Drift and Edvard Hoem authored Prøvetid. All these works focused on middle-aged men who live through the crises of life, while struggling to find new footing. Similarly Knut Faldbakken's novels about the change of men's roles during the women's revolution in the 1970s reflected the new direction.

The 1980s generated several major novels that develop a main theme over decades, are centered on a strong-central character person and are built around rural milieu or a local community of a not too distant past. Examples include Lars Saabye Christensen's Beatles, Tove Nilsen's Skyskraperengler (Skyscraper Angels), Ingvar Ambjørnsen's Hvite niggere (White Niggers), Gerd Brantenberg's St.Croix trilogy, Herbjørg Wassmo's Tora-trilogy and Roy Jacobsen's Seierherrene.

The 1980s have also been labeled the "fantasy decade" in Norwegian literature. A number of authors, including Kjartan Fløgstad, Mari Osmundsen, Hans Herbjørnsrud, Arild Nyquist, Jan Kjærstad and Ragnar Hovland produced works with magical, fantastic or improbable elements. Literature written for children and young people also included fantastic elements; Tormod Haugen is the most notable contributor to this genre.

A large number of 1980s authors displayed a high degree of literary consciousness. Many of the new authors in this decade were formally educated in literature, philosophy and other academic subjects at the many schools or institutes for writers established throughout Norway. Many novels generated internal conflicts with the text itself or with other texts, and the protagonists was represented as a writer, scientist or artist. Jan Kjærstad's Homo Falsus is perhaps the foremost of these 1980s meta-novels, Karin Moe's KYKA/1984 another. Ole Robert Sunde and Liv Nysted also produced works in this genre. Another consequence of more academically oriented authors was the large number of essay collections published in recent years; these often provide an authors' interpretations of other authors or reflections on other forms of art.

The period showed a rising interest in crime literature. Jon Michelet, Gunnar Staalesen, Kim Småge and Fredrik Skagen all were well appreciated by Norwegian readers. In the 1990s female crime writers such as Karin Fossum and Anne Holt had great success – the latter's works featured a female investigator. Interest in crime has in no way decreased since the turn of the millennium, and a number of writers have either specialized in crime or have alternated between crime and other prose. Jo Nesbø, Kurt Aust, Unni Lindell, Tom Egeland, Tom Kristensen, Jørn Lier Horst, Stein Morten Lier and Kjell Ola Dahl are among the authors in this category. A stream of translated crime, especially from Sweden and Britain, have influenced Norwegian authors of this genre.

Another clear trend is an interest in biographies, especially of authors and artists. Many of the significant living writers during the 1980s have written one or more biographies of deceased artist or other colleagues. In addition, several significant biographies were written. The Fall of the Sun God. Knut Hamsun by Jørgen Haugan and Ingar Sletten Kolloen's Knut Hamsun biography received great attention. There is a trend in these modern biographies – similar to today's cinema and unlike the past – to use source material of a private character.

In poetry Rolf Jacobsen's Nattåpent sold almost 20,000 copies and Harald Sverdrup's Lysets øyeblikk was also very well received. Stein Mehren, Tor Ulven and Paal-Helge Haugen also published significant collections of poetry during this decade. Jan Erik Vold wrote some of his most political poetry, reminiscent of the 1970s, during the 1990s. The new and emerging poetry shows great diversity. However, only the rare collection of poetry achieves substantial sales or circulation. Poetry can be said to be in a crisis state, unlike newer novels, which often are published in large quantities as the month's book for book clubs.

Theater audiences show only moderate interest in new Norwegian plays. Hence drama has been overshadowed by prose and poetry, with one exception: Jon Fosse. Fosse, through the 1990s and later, has achieved an international acclaim not enjoyed by any other Norwegian playwright since Ibsen.

=== 21st century ===
Karl Ove Knausgård had worldwide success with his six-volume series of autobiographical novels entitled My Struggle (Min kamp in Norwegian) and was described by Wall Street Journal as "one of the 21st-century's greatest literary sensations". Knausgård is also the author of novels (Ute av verden, En tid for alt, Morgenstjernen), the autobiographical Seasons Quartet and essay collections.

== Comics ==
Norway has a distinct comic strip and single-panel comic culture that it shares with Sweden.

Story-driven comics with local themes were popular in the postwar years, including Vangsgutane, Jens von Bustenskjold and Smørbukk. However, they gradually faded out of popularity, leading to several decades with no major locally produced comics (with the partial exception of Pyton). Starting in the early 1990s, a large number of strip comics were born from the local hype that had surrounded such US strip comics as Calvin & Hobbes, Piranha Club and Beetle Bailey. Significant names include Frode Øverli (Pondus, Rutetid), Lars Lauvik (Eon, Wildlife), Mads Eriksen (M), Lise Myhre (Nemi), Øyvind Sagosen (Radio Gaga), and the duo Emberland & Sveen (Sleivdal IL).

Starting out with a focus on slapstick comedy, Norwegian comic strips gradually focused more on relationships and family life from the late 2000s onwards, leading to the creation of additional comic strips made by names like Hanne Sigbjørnsen (Tegnehanne) and Nils Axle Kanten (Hjalmar).

== Electronic literature ==
Hans Kristian Rustad's book Digital litteratur (2012) provides an overview of early Norwegian electronic literature. See also the Nordic Electronic Literature Collection in the ELMCIP Electronic Literature Knowledge Base. Significant authors include Ottar Ormstad and Anne Bang Steinsvik.

== See also ==
- List of Norwegian Writers
- Project Runeberg
- Bible translations in Norway
- List of libraries in Norway
