= Gyldendal's Endowment =

Norwegian literature prize (1934–1995)

The Gyldendal Prize, formerly Gyldendal's Endowment, is a Norwegian literary prize awarded by the Norwegian publisher Gyldendal Norsk Forlag. Gyldendal's Endowment was awarded from 1934 to 1995 and was superseded by the Gyldendal Prize in 1996. The prize is awarded for the entire body of the author's work and regardless of their publisher.

== History ==
In 1996, the Gyldendal's endowment was superseded by the Gyldendal Prize, awarded for "particularly significant writing" over the body of a writer's work. Initially an annual award, it has been awarded every two years since 2015. With a monetary value of 50,000 Euros, it is Norway's richest literary prize. Previous winners include Dag Solstad, Jon Fosse, Vigdis Hjorth, Karl Ove Knausgård and Per Petterson.

In addition, since 1998, the publisher has awarded the Sult-prisen (Hunger Award) for "eminent young authors".

== Gyldendal's Endowment winners ==
- 1934 – Olav Duun
- 1935 – Peter Egge, Herman Wildenvey, Arnulf Øverland
- 1936 – Gabriel Scott
- 1937 – Cora Sandel
- 1938 – Arthur Omre
- 1939 – Johan Falkberget
- 1940 – Sigurd Christiansen, Ronald Fangen, Sigurd Hoel
- 1941 – Gunnar Reiss-Andersen, Kristian Elster
- 1942 – Inge Krokann
- 1943 – Tarjei Vesaas
- 1944 – Inger Hagerup
- 1945 – Johan Borgen
- 1946 – Emil Boyson, Ernst Orvil, Tore Ørjasæter
- 1947 – Nils Johan Rud
- 1948 – Ingeborg Møller, Aksel Sandemose
- 1949 – Gunnar Larsen, Magnhild Haalke
- 1950 – Egil Rasmussen, Hans Henrik Holm
- 1951 – Gunvor Hofmo
- 1952 – Jakob Sande, Mikkjel Fønhus
- 1953 – Engvald Bakkan
- 1954 – Agnar Mykle, Terje Stigen
- 1955 – Bjørn Rongen, Alfred Hauge
- 1956 – Sigbjørn Hølmebakk
- 1957 – Eivind Tverbak, Halldis Moren Vesaas
- 1958 – Astrid Tollefsen
- 1959 – Alf Larsen, Åge Rønning
- 1960 – Finn Bjørnseth
- 1961 – Johannes Heggland, Per Bronken
- 1962 – Bergljot Hobæk Haff
- 1963 – Åsta Holth, Arnold Eidslott, Ola Viker
- 1964 – Aslaug Låstad Lygre, Odd Hølaas
- 1965 – Marie Takvam, Gisken Wildenvey
- 1966 – Georg Johannesen, Odd Winger
- 1967 – Kåre Holt, Per Hansson
- 1968 – Jan Erik Vold
- 1969 – Knut Faldbakken
- 1970 – Espen Haavardsholm, Sigmund Skard, Merete Wiger
- 1971 – Tor Obrestad
- 1972 – Jens Bjørneboe
- 1973 – Tor Edvin Dahl
- 1974 – Emil Boyson, Nils Johan Rud, Gunvor Hofmo, Bergljot Hobæk Haff, Tor Åge Bringsværd
- 1975 – Pål Sundvor
- 1976 – Finn Carling, Sigurd Evensmo
- 1977 – Jan Jakob Tønseth
- 1978 – Olav Nordrå, Arne Ruste
- 1979 – Cecilie Løveid, Wera Sæther
- 1980 – Marta Schumann, Tormod Haugen
- 1981 – Gidske Anderson, Stein Mehren
- 1982 – Ola Bauer, Ketil Gjessing
- 1983 – Karin Bang, Terje Johanssen
- 1984 – Mari Osmundsen, Simen Skjønsberg
- 1985 – Paal-Helge Haugen, Geir Kjetsaa
- 1986 – Inger Elisabeth Hansen, Erland Kiøsterud
- 1987 – Hans Herbjørnsrud, Tor Ulven
- 1988 – Liv Køltzow, Øystein Lønn
- 1989 – Edvard Hoem, Gunnar Staalesen
- 1990 – Sigmund Mjelve, Atle Næss
- 1991 – Kjartan Fløgstad, Herbjørg Wassmo
- 1992 – Sissel Lie, Steinar Løding, Tor Fretheim
- 1993 – Britt Karin Larsen, Thorvald Steen
- 1994 – Kjersti Scheen, Bjørn Aamodt
- 1995 – Torgrim Eggen, Terje Holtet Larsen

== Gyldendal Prize winners ==
- 1996 – Dag Solstad
- 1997 – Bjørn Aamodt
- 1998 – Kjartan Fløgstad
- 1999 – Jon Fosse
- 2000 – Jan Erik Vold
- 2001 – Cecilie Løveid
- 2002 – Lars Amund Vaage
- 2003 – Inger Elisabeth Hansen
- 2004 – Stein Mehren
- 2005 – Roy Jacobsen
- 2006 – Einar Økland
- 2007 – Ole Robert Sunde
- 2008 – Paal-Helge Haugen
- 2009 – Tomas Espedal
- 2010 – Vigdis Hjorth
- 2011 – Karl Ove Knausgård
- 2012 – Per Petterson
- 2013 – Øyvind Rimbereid
- 2014 – Rune Christiansen
- 2015 – Liv Køltzow
- 2017 – Tone Hødnebø
- 2019 – Øyvind Berg
- 2021 – Espen Søbye
- 2023 – Hanne Ørstavik
- 2025 – Steinar Opstad
