= Ketil Gjessing =

Norwegian poet (born 1934)

Ketil Gjessing (born 18 February 1934) is a Norwegian poet. He made his literary début in 1962 with the collection Kransen om et møte. He was awarded the Gyldendal's Endowment in 1982.

Awards
Preceded by Gidske Anderson and Stein Mehren	Recipient of the Gyldendal's Endowment; 1982 (shared with Ola Bauer	Succeeded by Karin Bang and Terje Johanssen
