= Sigurd Evensmo =

Norwegian author and journalist

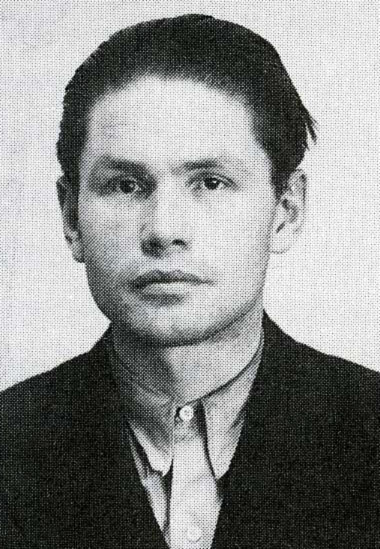
Sigurd Evensmo

Sigurd Evensmo (14 February 1912 – 17 October 1978) was a Norwegian author and journalist.

== Career ==
He was born in Hamar. In his younger years he was active in Clarté, a student organization at University of Oslo and in contact with Mot Dag, a forum among the social democratic students (later the Student's Communist Organization). He then joined the Workers' Youth League and worked actively with them. He began as a journalist apprentice with Hamar Arbeiderblad and continued as a journalist in many weekly workers papers including Tiden in Arendal, Fremtiden in Drammen and Arbeidernes Pressekontor in Oslo. Finally in 1939 he began to work for the Arbeiderbladet.

During the war Evensmo was active with the resistance and he wrote for the illegal paper, Bulletinen until he was forced into hiding and finally to flee from Norway. From 1953 through 1959 he was the editor for the paper Orientering. He served as film critic for the Norwegian Broadcasting Corporation (NRK) from 1948 until 1962.

Before the Second World War he had written a play, Konflikt, in 1934. His first novel, published in 1945, was Englandsfarere. The theme of the book was based on Evensmo's personal experiences during the war. His trilogy consisting of Grenseland (1947), Flaggermusene (1949) and Hjemover (1951) are recognized as a major example of Norwegian post-war literature, and explore the social and psychological differences between the country and city cultures as well as the intellectual development of workers between the wars. Evensmo won the Kritikerprisen for the books, and at the close of the 1970s, the trilogy was produced for television by NRK. His novels Gåten fra år null, Femten døgn med Gordona and Miraklet på Blindern can all be categorized as science fiction; Evensmo was among the first to write in this genre in Norway. He also wrote the scripts for many films.

=== Prizes and recognition ===
- 1951 - Norwegian Critics Prize for Literature for the trilogy novels Grenseland, Flaggermusene and Hjemover
- 1976 - Gyldendal's Endowment
- 1977 - Nominated for The Nordic Council's Literature Prize (Nordisk Råds litteraturpris) for the novel Inn i din tid

== Works ==
=== Books ===
- 1945 Englandsfarere, novel
- 1946 Oppbrudd etter midnatt, novel
- 1947 Grenseland, novel
- 1949 Flaggermusene, novel
- 1951 Hjemover, novel
- 1954 Glassveggen, collection of stories
- 1955 Trollspeilet: streiftokt i film
- 1956 Østenfor vest og vestenfor øst: Jugoslavia under Tito
- 1956 Gåten fra år null, novel
- 1962 Femten døgn med Gordona, novel
- 1964 Feider og finter
- 1966 Miraklet på Blindern, novel
- 1967 Det store tivoli: film og kino i Norge gjennom 70 år
- 1968 Norske forfattere i krig og fred: Den Norske forfatterforening 1940-1968, written with Alex Brinchmann
- 1969 Vold i filmene: ett års kinoprogrammer i Norge og noen perspektiver
- 1970 Observasjoner, essay collection
- 1971 Den nakne sannheten: sex i filmene
- 1974 Gyldendal og gyldendøler
- 1976 Inn i din tid
- 1978 Ut i kulda

=== Drama ===
- 1934 Konflikt, play
- 1952 Fredsprisen, radio play
- 1955 Blodveien, film script
- 1981 Stengetid, play

Awards
Preceded by Torborg Nedreaas	Recipient of the Norwegian Critics Prize for Literature; 1951	Succeeded by Ragnvald Skrede
Preceded by Pål Sundvor	Recipient of the Gyldendal's Endowment; 1976 (shared with Finn Carling)	Succeeded by Jan Jakob Tønseth
