= Per Bronken =

Norwegian director and actor (1935–2002)

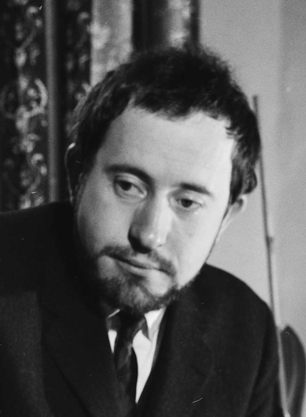
- Bronken in 1966
- Born: 13 March 1935; Tromsø, Norway
- Died: 4 October 2002 (aged 67)
- Occupations: Poet, novelist, actor, film director and stage producer
- Spouse: Monna Tandberg (m. 1962–1971)
- Awards: Gyldendal's Endowment (1961)

Per Bronken (13 March 1935 – 4 October 2002) was a Norwegian poet, novelist, actor, film director and stage producer.

== Career ==
Bronken made his literary debut in 1955 with the poetry collection Kom drikk også mitt blod. He made his stage debut at Riksteatret in 1957. He worked as stage producer for Fjernsynsteatret for several periods from 1962, and played an important role in the development of Norwegian television drama. He was awarded the Gyldendal's Endowment in 1961.

== Personal life ==
Bronken was born in Tromsø, a son of merchant Alfred Sivertsen and nurse Ingeborg Bronken. He was married to actress Monna Tandberg from 1962 to 1971, and to actress Marie Louise Tank from 1974.

== Filmography ==
Year	Title	Role	Notes
1957	Nine Lives	Ole, kjelketrekker	
1966	Nederlaget	(director)	NRK Television Theater
1986	Blackout	Politiinspektøren	

Awards
Preceded by Finn Bjørnseth	Recipient of the Gyldendal's Endowment; 1961 (shared with Johannes Heggland)	Succeeded by Bergljot Hobæk Haff
