= Finn Carling =

Norwegian writer

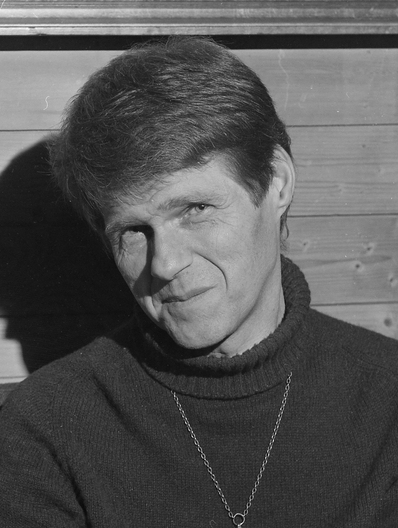
- Finn Carling in 1974
- Born: 1 October 1925; Oslo, Norway
- Died: 12 March 2004 (aged 78)
- Occupations: Novelist, playwright, poet and essayist
- Awards: Riksmål Society Literature Prize (1970); Gyldendal's Endowment (1976); Dobloug Prize (1986); Aschehoug Prize (1987); Arts Council Norway Honorary Award (1999)

Finn Carling (1 October 1925 – 12 March 2004) was a Norwegian novelist, playwright, poet and essayist.

== Biography ==
He was born in Oslo, Norway. He took artium in 1945 and studied psychology at the University of Oslo from 1945-49. He followed with a course of study of sociology, history and literature at Howard University in Washington, D.C. during 1957-58.

He made his literary debut in 1949 with Broen (two short stories and a one-act play). He had authorship of several genres, and became a key figure in Norwegian post-war literature. Carling had innate cerebral palsy. He described his childhood and adolescence with this disability in the autobiographical novel Kilden og muren (1958).

He died during 2004 and was buried at Voksen kirkegård in Oslo.

== Awards ==
- Riksmål Society Literature Prize - 1970
- Gyldendal's Endowment - 1976
- Dobloug Prize - 1986
- Aschehoug Prize - 1987
- Norsk kulturråds ærespris - 1999

== Other sources ==
- Louis Muinzer (1996). "Finn Carling: A Personal Introduction". World Literature Today. 70 (2). World Literature Today. Vol. 70, No. 2 (Spring, 1996), pp. 277-282: 277–282. doi:10.2307/40152043. JSTOR 40152043.

Awards
Preceded by Sverre Fehn	Recipient of the Norsk kulturråds ærespris 1999	Succeeded by Anne Brown
Preceded by Pål Sundvor	Recipient of the Gyldendal's Endowment; 1976 (shared with Sigurd Evensmo)	Succeeded by Jan Jakob Tønseth
