= Johannes Heggland =

Norwegian writer

Johannes Martin Heggland
- Born: 29 June 1919; Tysnes Municipality, Norway
- Died: 24 January 2008 (aged 88)
- Occupations: novelist, playwright, short story and children's literature writer, politician,

Johannes Heggland (29 June 1919 – 24 January 2008) was a Norwegian novelist, short story and children's literature writer, playwright, and elected official with the Centre Party. He is most commonly associated with two of his historic plays Mostraspelet and Håkonarspelet – Kongen med gullhjelmen.

== Biography ==
Johannes Andreas Martin Heggland was born in Tysnes Municipality in Hordaland, Norway. His parents, Vermund Heggland (1872–1945) and Elisabeth Marie Magdalene Nerhus (1877–1956), were farmers. He grew up as the youngest of 11 children in a family with a vivid oral tradition.

He participated in local politics for nearly 30 years. Heggland was mayor of Tysnes Municipality from 1956 to 1959 and 1968 to 1971, and served as a deputy representative to the Parliament of Norway during the term 1958–1961. He was chairman of Norwegian Authors' Union from 1982 to 1985 and member of the Nordic Council's literary prize committee from 1983 to 1986. He was also a member of the Norwegian Language Council and board member for Riksteatret.

Heggland made his literary debut in 1941 with Folk under fjell, and later wrote more than sixty books. Nearly half of his books are based on extensive historical studies, from the Bronze Age to the present time, with emphasis on the time around the Black Death. His prose is in the broad epic tradition with a Sunnhordland dialect and great insight into Norwegian rural society. Heggland stood outside modernism, social realism and metaphysical literature. He insisted all along on epic realism and traditionalism.

Mostraspelet is a play in three acts with music by Kjell Habbestad. It had its world premiere in 1984. Set on the island of Moster in Sunnhordland during the years 995, 997 and 1024, the play deals with the introduction of Christianity in Norway by King Olaf Tryggvason. Mostraspelet is performed annually at the open-air theatre in Bømlo Municipality.

Håkonarspelet – Kongen med gullhjelmen is a series of historic plays he wrote based upon the reign of King Haakon I of Norway. The plays are performed annual as part of the Håkonarspelet summer festival. They have been performed since 1997 at the Royal Norwegian Navy base at Haakonsvern and at Fitjar, Seim, and Eivindvik.

Johannes Heggland received a number of literary awards for during his career, including the Nynorsk Literature Prize in 1988, Dobloug Prize in 1990 and Emmausprisen in 2001. He was proclaimed a Knight, First Class of the Order of St. Olav for his cultural work.

== Awards ==
- Emmaus Award (2001)
- Doblougprisen Prize for Literature (1990)
- Melsom Prize (1972)
- Alfred Andersson-Rysst Fund (1965)
- Gyldendal's Endowment (1961)
- Ministry of Culture's award of children's literature (1962, 1963, 1964, 1970, 1972)

== Selected works ==
=== Novels ===
- Folk under fjell (1941)
- Guds åkerland (1943
- Menneskebrunnen (1949)
- Gard (1951)
- Kvinnfolkgarden (1955)
- Dagen før domedag (1961)
- Gabriel (1969)
- Rusdøler (1971)
- Brødet frå havet, four volumes (1981–84)
- Seglet og vinden, three volumes (1985–87)
- Det saltlause saltet (1999)

=== Plays ===
- Kongen med gullhjelmen (1996)
- Håkon Adelsteinsfostre (1996)
- Håkon Adelsteinfostre i Gula (1996)
- Håkonarvarde (1995)

Awards
Preceded by Finn Bjørnseth	Recipient of the Gyldendal's Endowment; 1961 (shared with Per Bronken)	Succeeded by Bergljot Hobæk Haff
Cultural offices
Preceded by Camilla Carlson	Chair of the Norwegian Authors' Union	Succeeded by Karsten Alnæs
