= Ola Viker =

Norwegian novelist and lawyet

- Born: 5 April 1897; Fluberg, Norway
- Died: 20 February 1972 (aged 74)
- Occupation: Novelist
- Awards: Gyldendal's Endowment

Ola Viker (1897–1972) was a Norwegian novelist and lawyer. He wrote a total of eight novels, and was awarded the Gyldendal's Endowment in 1963.

== Personal life and education ==
Viker was born in Fluberg, Oppland on 5 April 1897, a son of farmers Harald Viker and Ingeborg Louise Schee. He married Christine Wang in 1930.

After graduating in jurisprudence in 1923, he worked as lawyer in Dokka until 1937. He then took over the family farm from his parents.

== Literary career ==
He made his literary debut in 1951 with the novel Gullskoen. His next novels were Månemyra (1953), and Dommerbordet (1955). He wrote a total of eight novels, all with the lawyer "Karl" as protagonist and storyteller. There are tales from ancient times, such as the 1600s or 1700s, about thieves, murderers, horse traders, farm workers, wolf hunters and supersticious women, and events like tragic love stories, hard generation conflicts between fathers and sons, suspicious drowning accidents, and border disputes. His last five novels are Karl Fortelleren from 1960, Ulvegraven (1961), Kilden (1963), which earned him the Riksmål newspaper Frisprog's literary prize, Guttorm den gode (1964), and Frostrøyk og morgenrøde (1968).

He was awarded the Gyldendal's Endowment in 1963.

== Death ==
Viker died in Oslo on 20 February 1972, at the age of 74.

Awards
Preceded by Bergljot Hobæk Haff	Recipient of the Gyldendal's Endowment; 1963 (shared with Åsta Holth and Arnold Eidslott	Succeeded by Aslaug Låstad Lygre and Odd Hølaas
