= Merete Wiger =

Norwegian writer (1921–2015)

- Born: 3 January 1921; Trondheim, Norway
- Died: 24 December 2015 (aged 94)
- Occupation: Writer

Merete Wiger (3 January 1921 – 24 December 2015) was a Norwegian novelist, author of short stories, children's writer and playwright.

== Literary career ==
Born in Trondheim on 3 January 1921, Wiger made her literary debut in 1957 with the novel Så låste hun seg inn. Her novel - grensen from 1965 is written in the form of a diary of an imprisoned women who tries to explain why she murdered her husband, but it later turns out her husband is alive and the woman is actually locked up in a mental institution. Wiger was awarded the Gyldendal's Endowment in 1970.

She was a board member of the Norwegian Authors' Union from 1978 to 1983.
