= Monna Tandberg =

Norwegian actress (1939–2025)

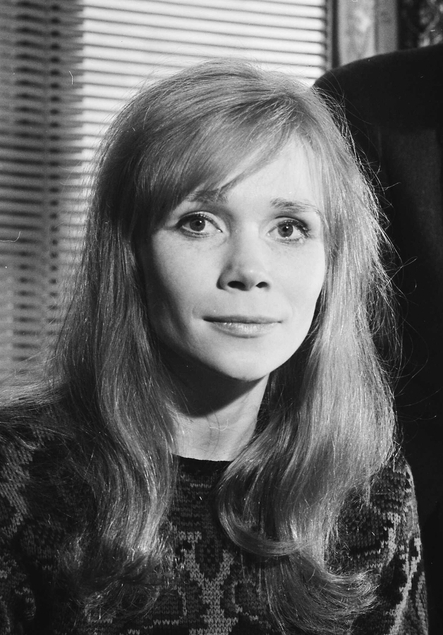
- Tandberg in 1966
- Born: 2 July 1939; Oslo, Norway
- Died: 25 May 2025 (aged 85)
- Occupation: Actress
- Years active: 1960–2009
- Spouses: Per Bronken (m. 1962; div. 1971) Arild Brinchmann (m. 1972; died 1986)
- Partner: Lars Andreas Larssen (1993–2014)
- Awards: Order of St. Olav (2007); Gammleng Award (2009)

Monna Tandberg (2 July 1939 – 25 May 2025) was a Norwegian actress. She played for Fjernsynsteatret from 1961 to 1964, for Det Norske Teatret from 1964 to 1969, and for Nationaltheatret from 1969 until her retirement in 2009.

== Background ==
Monna Tandberg was born in Oslo on 2 July 1939, to physician Morten Odd Tandberg and painter Nora Heffermehl. She was married to Per Bronken and Arild Brinchmann, and from 1993 she lived with actor Lars Andreas Larssen.

On 25 May 2025, she died at the age of 85.

== Career ==
Tandberg made her stage debut at Nationaltheatret in 1960, in the play Det smeller i dørene, an adaptation of Michel Fermaud's Les portes claquent.

She was signed with Fjernsynsteatret from 1961 to 1964, and with Det Norske Teatret from 1964 to 1969. She was appointed at Nationaltheatret from 1969 onwards, where she played more than sixty roles.

She played queen Isabella in Kong Edvard II by Christopher Marlowe in 1970, and played in Voks by Danish playwright Klaus Rifbjerg. Touring in Japan, she played the title role in Ibsen’s play Hedda Gabler, which premiered in Kyoto in 1971, and further was shown in sixteen theatres in Tokyo, Osaka and other cities. The performance was subsequently filmed for Norwegian television. In 1972 she played The Young Lady in Spøksonaten by August Strindberg, in an adaptation directed by Stein Winge. In 1973 she played Tetania in an adaptation of A Midsummer Night's Dream (Shakespeare), and queen Agave in Bakkantinnene (Euripides). In 1974 she played one of the principal women roles in Slott over slott in an adaptation of a play by Eugene O'Neill.

In 1980 she acted in an adaptation of Ubu Roi by Alfred Jarry, staged at the Torshov Theatre, where she played king Venceslas. In 1981 she acted in an adaptation of Federico García Lorca's play La casa de Bernarda Alba. She acted in the stage play Dark of the Moon by Howard Richardson in 1985, and played the role of an adventurous lady in an adaptation of On the Verge; or, The Geography of Yearning by Eric Overmyer.

Her last appearance for Nationaltheatret was playing Alice in an adaptation of William Nicholson's play Retreat from Moscow, when she retired from the theatre in 2009.

== Awards ==
Tandberg was decorated a Knight, First Class of the Order of St. Olav in 2007. She received the Gammleng Award in 2009.
