= Bjørn Rongen =

Norwegian writer (1906–1983)

Bjørn Rongen (24 July 1906 – 26 August 1983) was a Norwegian novelist and children's writer.

He was born in Evanger Municipality in the Voss district of Søndre Bergenhus county, Norway. He lived in Drøbak most of his adult life. He made his literary debut in 1934 with the story To semester. Among his most important works was the trilogy: Toget over vidda, I jøkulens skygge and Klart for tog, from the period of the construction of the Bergen Line.

Rongen contributed a large number of short stories and was also a children's book author. He was awarded the Gyldendal's Endowment in 1955.
