= Stein Mehren =

Norwegian poet, essayist and playwright

- Born: 16 May 1935; Oslo, Norway
- Died: 28 July 2017 (aged 82)
- Occupations: Poet; Essayist; Playwright
- Relatives: Martin Mehren (uncle)
- Awards: Norwegian Critics Prize for Literature; Mads Wiel Nygaards Endowment; Dobloug Prize; Riksmål Society Literature Prize; Norwegian Academy Prize in memory of Thorleif Dahl; Fritt Ord Award

Stein Mehren (16 May 1935 – 28 July 2017) was a Norwegian poet, essayist and playwright. He made his literary debut as poet with Gjennom stillheten en natt (1960). He wrote more than fifty books, mainly poetry.

== Background ==
Mehren was born in Oslo, Norway to physician and dentist Haakon Mehren (1910–38) and Solveig Marie Klaveness Bjerke (1908–55). He was a nephew of merchant Martin Mehren (1905–2002). After graduating from secondary school in 1953, Mehren studied philosophy at the University of Oslo for several years.

== Career ==
He made his literary debut with the poetry collection Gjennom stillheten en natt in 1960. Other collections from the 1960s are Alene med en himmel (1962), Mot en verden av lys (1963), Gobelin Europa (1965), Tids alder (1966), and Aurora. Det Niende Mørke (1969). Among his essay collections are Samtidsmuseet og andre tekster (1966), Maskinen og menneskekroppen (1970), and Myten og den irrasjonelle fornuft (two volumes, 1977 and 1980). He has written two plays, Narren og hans hertug (1968, staged at Nationaltheatret), and Den store søndagsfrokosten (1976). In the 1970s he wrote two novels, De utydelige (1972) and Titanene (1974).

== Awards ==
Mehren received the Norwegian Critics Prize for Literature and the Mads Wiel Nygaards Endowment in 1963 for Mot en verden av lys. He was awarded the Swedish Academy’s Dobloug Prize in 1971. He received Aschehougprisen in 1973, the Riksmål Society Literature Prize in 1975, the Fritt Ord Award in 1979, the Norwegian Academy Prize in memory of Thorleif Dahl in 1987 and the Gyldendalprisen in 2004. In 1993, he was awarded the Anders Jahre Cultural Prize (Anders Jahres kulturpris) jointly with pianist Robert Levin.

== Personal life ==
From 1964 to 1975 he was married to Tove Halvorsen, then to Siri Hjemdal from 1979 to 1981.

Awards
Preceded by Karen-Christine Friele	Recipient of the Fritt Ord Award; 1979	Succeeded by Andrey Sakharov
Preceded by Marta Schumann and Tormod Haugen	Recipient of the Gyldendal's Endowment; 1981 (shared with Gidske Anderson)	Succeeded by Ola Bauer and Ketil Gjessing
