= Sigmund Mjelve =

Norwegian writer

- Born: 6 April 1926
- Died: 26 November 1995 (aged 69)
- Occupation: Writer
- Awards: Gyldendal's Endowment (1990); Brage Prize (1994)

Sigmund Mjelve (6 April 1926 – 26 November 1995) was a Norwegian writer.

He made his literary debut in 1978 with the poetry collection Landskap. Fire pseudonymer fra Kirgisersteppene og andre steder, followed by the sequel Landskap 2 in 1979, and Lanskap 3 in 1981.

He was awarded Gyldendal's Endowment in 1990, and the Brage Prize in 1994 for Område aldri fastlagt.

== Awards ==
- Gyldendal's Endowment 1990
- Brage Prize 1994
