= Hans Henrik Holm =

Norwegian writer (1896–1980)

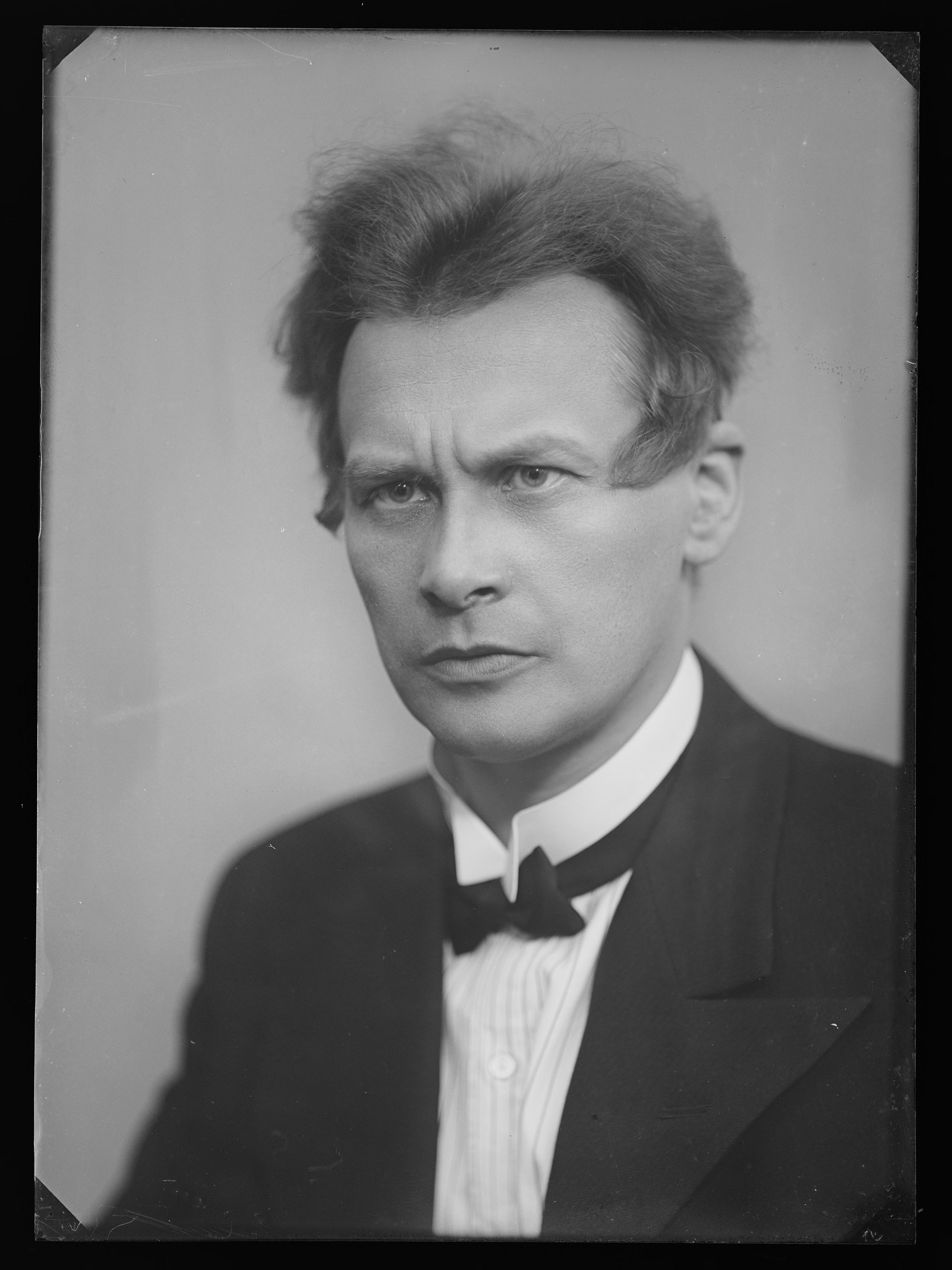
- Born: 18 January 1896; Kristiania, Norway
- Died: 27 September 1980 (aged 84)
- Occupations: Poet and folklorist

Hans Henrik Holm (18 January 1896 – 27 September 1980) was a Norwegian poet and folklorist. He made his literary début in 1933 with the epic poem Jonsoknatt, the first in a series of seven volumes. His published the trilogy Bygdir i solrøyk between 1949 and 1951. He was awarded the Gyldendal's Endowment in 1950.
