= Odd Winger =

Norwegian writer (1923–1998)

Odd Selmer
- Born: 8 January 1923; Strinda Municipality, Norway
- Died: 4 February 1998 (aged 75)
- Occupations: Journalist, author
- Awards: Gyldendal's Endowment (1966)

Odd Winger (8 January 1923 – 4 February 1998) was a Norwegian journalist, novelist, and children's writer.

== Career ==
Born in Strinda Municipality on 8 January 1923, Winger made his literary debut in 1953 with the sea novel Mot Land's End. In 1962 he wrote the psychological thriller Falsk kvartett, where four protagonists are revealed as selfish male chauvinists. Another psychological thriller is Novemberspill from 1965, set in a suburban environment. Further novels are Vinteren (1966), Seileren (1967), Nattefjest (1968), and Supermarked (1971). His short story collection Bilisten from 1974 is a satirical description of the consumer society. He wrote the novels Romanen (1976), Legende (1977), and Scribe from 1985. He also wrote books for children and young adults.

He worked as a journalist for the newspaper Dagbladet from 1958. He was awarded the Gyldendal's Endowment in 1966.

Winger died on 4 February 1998, aged 75.
