= Egil Rasmussen =

Norwegian writer, literature critic and pianist

Egil Rasmussen (28 April 1903 – 18 June 1964) was a Norwegian writer, literature critic and pianist.

Rasmussen was born in the village of Bossekop in Alta Municipality in Finnmark county, Norway. He grew up in Tromsø after Rasmussen's family moved to the city when he was 3 years old.

Rasmussen attended college and worked part time as a lector. He received his Ph.D. in 1949. From 1948 to 1964 he was literary critic for the newspaper Aftenposten. His first literary effort was at 20 years of age when he produced the novel Østen og vesten in 1923. His last novel, Den siste skrivekaren. En norsk bygdelegende, was a dystopian vision of the future, which came out posthumously in 1966.

He received the Norwegian Critics Prize for Literature (Kritikerprisen) in 1953 for his novel Sonjas hjerte.

== Bibliography ==
- Østen og Vesten – novel (1923)
- Drapsmanden. Roman fra Tromsø – novel (1925)
- Mørk demring – novel (1934)
- Idag er alt mulig – novel (1937)
- Et rop i stormen – novel (1938)
- Presten fra havet – novel (1941)
- Kunstneren og samfunnsbildet – prose (1949)
- Angstens dikter Edgar Allan Poe – prose (1949)
- Gammelprestens koffert – novel (1950)
- Sonjas hjerte – novel (1953)
- En konge rider hjem – novel (1955)
- Det dømte hus – novel (1957)
- Hvor ørnene samles – novel (1958)
- Guttene fra Gokkohjørnet – novel (1959)
- Legenden om Lovella – novel (1961)
- Den siste skrivekaren. En norsk bygdelegende – novel (1966)

=== Prizes ===
- Gyldendal's Endowment - 1950 (jointly with Hans Henrik Holm)
- Kritikerprisen - 1953 (for Sonjas hjerte)
- Mads Wiel Nygaards legat - 1958
