= Karin Bang =

Norwegian writer (1928–2017)

- Born: 3 December 1928
- Died: 20 August 2017 (aged 88)
- Occupations: poet, novelist, children's writer and crime writer.
- Writing career
- Period: 1949–2017
- Genres: poetry, prose, crime fiction, children's books
- Notable awards: Riksmål Society Literature Prize ( 1966); Aschehoug Prize ( 1976); Gyldendal's Endowment (1983)

Karin Bang (3 December 1928 – 20 August 2017) was a Norwegian poet, novelist, children's writer and crime fiction writer.

== Early and personal life ==
Bang was born in Oslo as the daughter of industrial manager Alf Bang and Dagmar Kathinka Hansen. She grew up in an isolated and protected environment in Oslo, while the summers were spent at the family's summer house in Veierland, Vestfold, where she was influenced from old coastal culture. After examen artium in 1947 she worked five years as a secretary in Oslo, while she wrote her first books. She was married to writer Aasmund Brynildsen from 1952 until his death in 1974, and cohabited with the writer Sigbjørn Hølmebakk from 1979 until he died in 1981.

== Literary career ==
Bang made her literary debut in 1949 with two light reading novels, while the novel Glemte vinger from 1951 is regarded as her debut as a serious writer. Other novels were Fjerne seil (1962) and Blåst om babord–! (1964). Her novel Blues (1968) from the drug scene was the basis for a film from 1969, called Psychedelica Blues. Her trilogy Bedremannsbarn (1973), Borgersinn (1974) and Nye veier (1979) is a family chronicle from the early 1900s. Her double novel Jutøy, consisting of Havet ble blod (1978) and Jag etter vind (1981), are historical novels from the whaling pioneer time in Vestfold between 1809 and 1905. The story takes place on the fictitious island Jutøy and among whalers at the polar sea, and also depicts whaling pioneer Svend Foyn.

She was a member of the Norwegian Authors' Union's literary council for several periods.

Bang is a passionate collector of ancient dolls, and she edited the anthology Har dukkene sjel? (1985), in which she contributed an article on the cultural history of dolls. She has written two children's books, Lotte på loftet (1992) and Katten på Sjørøverøya (1994). She has also written two crime novels, Mord i måneskinn (1956) and Seilas med døden (1960).

== Awards and honours ==
Bang has received several literary prizes, including the Riksmål Society Literature Prize in 1966, the Aschehoug Prize in 1976, and the Gyldendal's Endowment in 1983 (shared with Terje Johanssen).
