= Steinar Løding =

Norwegian writer

Steinar Løding (born 3 April 1950) is a Norwegian novelist. Among his novels are Glomma brenner from 1982, Erindringens tre from 1992, and Jernalderdrøm. Første bok. Flukten fra Ninive from 1997. He was awarded the Gyldendal's Endowment in 1992, shared with Sissel Lie.
