= Tore Elias Hoel =

Norwegian writer

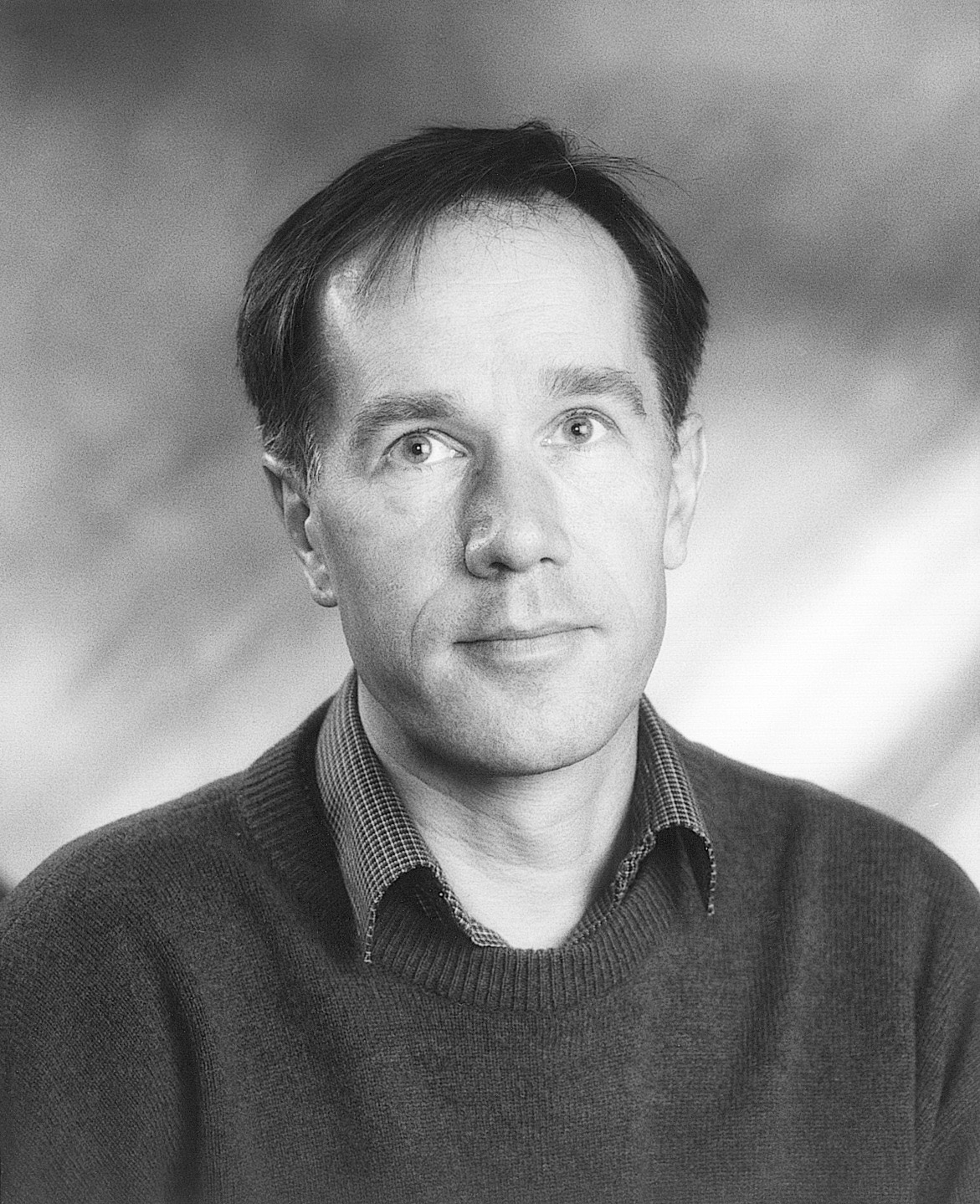
Tore Elias Hoel

Tore Elias Hoel (born 14 December 1953 in Harstad, Norway) is a Norwegian poet, author and children's author. He won the Blixprisen in 2003.

== Bibliography ==
- 1979 – Å fange en hval (poems)
- 1981 – Presidentens ro (poems)
- 1988 – Verdsmeisteren (novel)
- 1991 – Eg heiter Pawel (novel)
- 1999 – Fire dagar i Nairobi (novel)
- 2003 – Glaskula (novel)
- 2005 – Vinterfilm (novel)
- 2005 – Jomfru Rosenving på Santavajasø (libretto for Children's opera)
- 2007 – To gutar til Paris (novel)
