= Haakon Bugge Mahrt =

Norwegian diplomat and writer (1901–1990)

Haakon Bugge Mahrt (1901–1990) was a Norwegian writer and attaché.

He was born in Vardø and took the licencié ès lettres degree in Paris in 1928. He worked at the Norwegian embassy in Paris as a press attaché from 1946 to 1971. Books include Modernisme (1931), Kjære Europa (1932), Orkanen (1936), Bitter té (1945), Dikteren og eventyreren Arthur Rimbaud (1945) and Rømlingen fra Vardøhus (1961). He also translated John Steinbeck's novels "Of Mice and Men" and "Tortilla Flat" into Norwegian and is credited as one of the script writers for the 1948 French-Norwegian film "Kampen om tungtvannet."
