= Gunnar Reiss-Andersen =

Norwegian writer (1896–1964)

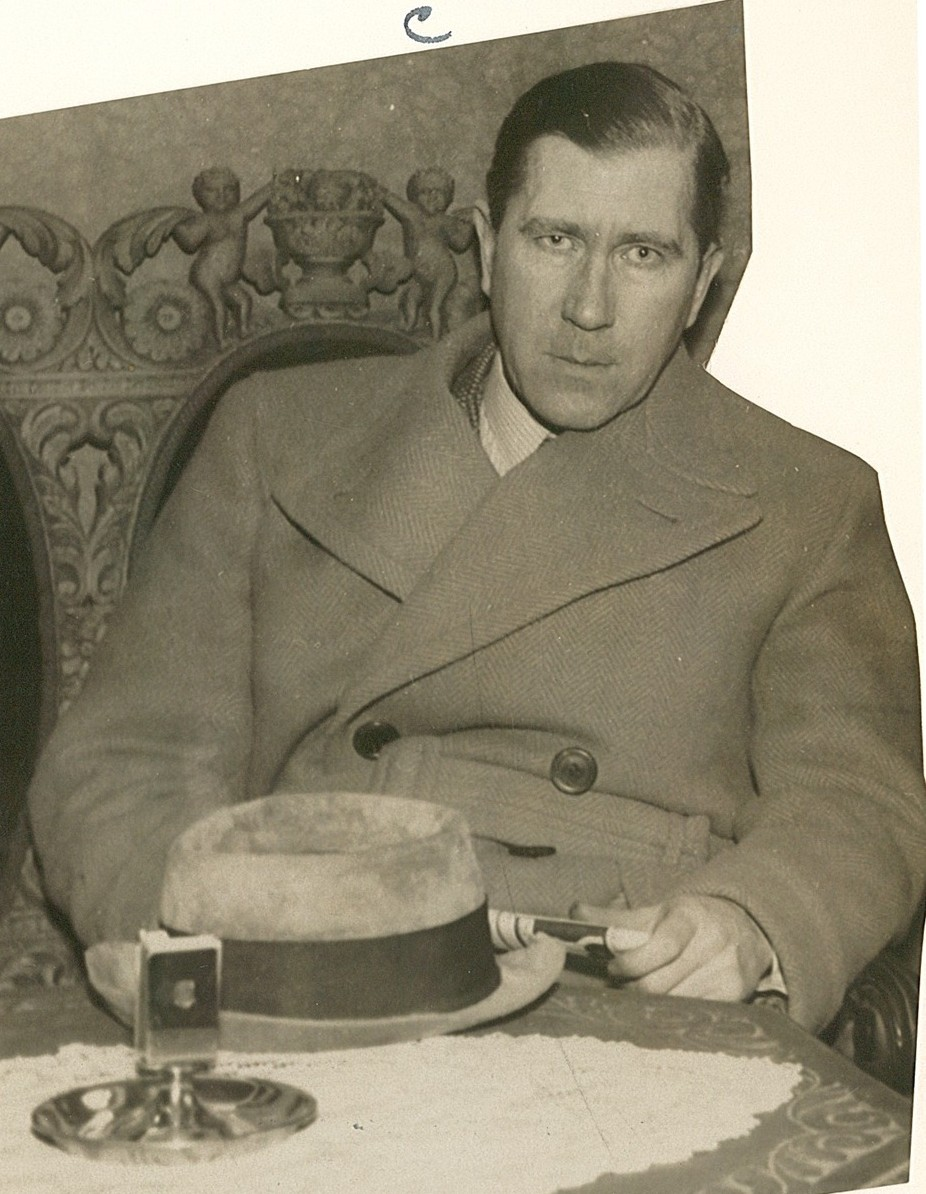
Gunnar Reiss-Andersen in 1935

Gunnar Reiss-Andersen (21 August 1896 – 29 July 1964) was a Norwegian lyric poet and writer.

== Biography ==
He was born at Larvik in Vestfold, Norway. Reiss-Andersen went to sea at 17 years of age, sailing the Baltic and North Seas for a year in the brig “Baron von Holberg", which was commanded by his uncle, Knut Knutsen. After completing the Examen artium with emphasis in Latin in 1916 he went into the military, becoming a non-commissioned officer. There he followed his inclination towards the arts, painting portraits. He subsequently studied painting in Copenhagen (1917–1919) and Paris (1919–1921). For several years he worked as an artist, illustrator, and the art reviewer for the Arbeiderbladet newspaper in Oslo.

In 1921 he debuted as a lyric poet with his poetry collection titled Indvielsens aar.

He participated in the Norwegian resistance movement beginning in 1940 and during the early years of the Second World War, writing clandestinely distributed anti-war poetry to express opposition to the German occupation. In 1942 he was forced to flee to Sweden to avoid arrest by the Gestapo. He achieved a wide following in Norway by serving as one of the voices for the resistance, along with Nordahl Grieg and Arnulf Øverland. His contributions included several resistance-oriented collections of poetry including a collection written primarily in Norway titled Kampdikt fra Norge 1940-43 (“War Poetry from Norway 1940-43”) which was published in Stockholm in 1943 and Norsk røst (“Norwegian Voice of Conscience”) which was published in Stockholm in 1944. His poetry written during the war, which had previously circulated illegally, was published in Norway as a collection in the spring of 1945, and enjoyed popularity.

During his stay in Sweden, he was exposed to modernistic Swedish poetry and the influence of this genre became obvious in his post-war work.

Reiss-Andersen was awarded the Norwegian state’s artist salary in 1945; this is a substantial recognition which had previously been awarded to well-recognized writers, poets, playwrights and composers including Bjørnstjerne Bjørnson, Henrik Ibsen, Edvard Grieg, Olav Duun and Johan Falkberget. After 1963 he also received an honorary salary from the publishing house, Gyldendal in recognition for his contributions.

== Personal life ==
In 1921, Reiss-Andersen married Elizabeth Waage (1898–1962). There were the parents of journalist Gry Waage (born 1922). In 1925 he married Tordis Castberg Anker (1899–1967). They had a son, Helge Reiss-Andersen (1926–2009). Gunnar Reiss-Andersen was also the father of Dag Halvorsen (1934–2007), who was a journalist and foreign correspondent. He is the paternal grandfather of attorney Berit Reiss-Andersen (born 1954) who is best known for her work as Norwegian State Secretary.

In 1962, King Haakon awarded him the rank Knight, First Class in the Royal Norwegian Order of St. Olav. Reiss-Andersen died in 1964 and was buried at Undersbo kirke in Larvik. In 1977, a bust of Reiss-Andersen by Stinius Fredriksen (1902–1977) was placed in the market square at Larvik city center.

== Bibliography ==
- Indvielsens aar – poetry collection (1921)
- Mellem Løven og Venus – poetry collection (1923)
- Solregn – poetry collection (1924)
- Nyt liv – novel (1925)
- Kongesønnens bryllup – poetry collection (1926)
- Himmelskrift – poetry collection (1928)
- Lykkens prøve – poetry collection; (1931)
- Spanske farver og annen kulør – nonfiction, travel narrative (1933)
- Horisont – poetry collection (1934)
- Vidnesbyrd – poetry collection (1936)
- Sensommerdagene – poetry collection (1940)
- Kampdikt fra Norge 1940-43 – poetry collection, published in Stockholm and Copenhagen (1943)
- Norsk røst – poetry collection, published in Stockholm (1944)
- Henrik Wergeland – play chronicling his life, published in Stockholm (1944)
- Dikt fra krigstiden – poetry collection, reprinted selections from Kampdikt fra Norge and Norsk røst which had been published in Stockholm during the war (1945)
- Samlede dikt – poetry collection (1946)
- Prinsen av Isola – poetry collection (1949)
- Lykkens prøve – selected poetry (1950)
- Det smilende alvor – essays (1954)
- Usynlige seil – poetry (1956)
- År på en strand – poetry (1962)
- Dikt i utvalg 1921-1962 – selected poetry, published posthumously (1972)

== Radio plays ==
- Mannen fra havet (Broadcast 11 March 1939)
- Scener fra Henrik Wergelands liv (Broadcast 17 June 1945)

== Awards ==
- Gyldendal's Endowment- 1941
- Dobloug Prize- 1955
- Nominated for the Nordic Council's Literature Prize -1962
- Norwegian Academy of Literature and Freedom of Expression - 1963
