= Tor Edvin Dahl =

Norwegian writer (born 1943)

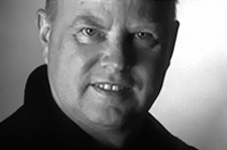
- Born: Tor Edvin Dahl; 10 September 1943 (age 82); Oslo, Norway
- Occupations: Novelist, short story writer, playwright, crime fiction writer, children's writer
- Spouse(s): Aud Josefsen 1965–84; Anne Skjelmerud 1986–
- Writing career
- Language: Norwegian
- Notable works: Guds tjener, Etterforskning pågår
- Notable awards: Gyldendal's Endowment, 1973; Riverton Prize, 1973; Bastian Prize, 1986

Tor Edvin Dahl (born 10 September 1943) is a Norwegian novelist, crime fiction writer, playwright, children's writer, non-fiction writer, translator, literary critic and journalist.

== Literary career ==
Dahl made his literary debut in 1968 with the short story collection En sommer tung av regn. His first novel was Den andre from 1972, and his literary breakthrough was the novel Guds tjener (English: Servant of God) from 1973.

He has written crime fiction using the pseudonym "David Torjussen". His first crime novel, Etterforskning pågår from 1973, earned him the Riverton Prize.

He was awarded the Gyldendal's Endowment in 1973.

== Personal life ==
Dahl was born in Oslo on 10 September 1943, the son of Josef Dahl and Evy Alice Holmen. From 1965 to 1984 he was married to Aud Josefsen, and since 1986 to Anne Skjelmerud.

== Awards ==
- 1973 – Riverton Prize for Ongoing Investigation
- 1973 – Gyldendal Grant
- 1974 – Sarpsborg Prize
- 1986 – Bastian Prize for Children's and Young Adult Literature for the translation of Roald Dahl's The Witches
- 1988 – Ministry of Culture and Church Affairs Translation Award for Children's and Young Adult Literature
