= Torgrim Eggen =

Norwegian musician and writer (born 1958)

- Born: 29 October 1958 (age 67); Oslo
- Occupations: Musician, journalist, magazine editor, novelist and non-fiction writer.
- Awards: Gyldendal's Endowment (1995); Brageprisen (2019)

Torgrim Eggen (born 29 October 1958) is a Norwegian musician, journalist, magazine editor, novelist and non-fiction writer. Among his books are Gjeld from 1992 and the novel Pynt from 2000. Duften av Havana from 2002 is a cultural history of the cigar, and Manhattan from 2007 is about New York City. Eggen was awarded the Gyldendal's Endowment in 1995 (shared with Terje Holtet Larsen).

== Awards ==
- 2019: Brageprisen for Axel; fra smokken til Ovnen; storyen om Axel Jensen
