= Per Jan Ingebrigtsen =

Norwegian writer and director (born 1946)

Per Jan Ingebrigtsen (born June 19, 1946 in Stord Municipality, Norway) is a Norwegian writer and director. He teaches drama at Stord vidaregåande skule.

== Selected written works ==
=== Poetry ===
- Rotbløyte (1975)
- Etter ei regnskur (1979)

=== Children's novels ===
- Sofus på landet (1983)
- Chathrines blues, Helges rus (1983)

=== Collected stories ===
- Sentimental (2003)
- Diktboka (1999)
- Ut og plukke viser ("Rosa Lind", "Stille kveldar i mai", Samlaget.)
- Låvesvalens svanesang (1979)
- Språkforming – Norsk språklære for ungdomsskulen (1998)
- Grunnbok i norsk for 9. klasse (1998)

== As director ==
- Hair (1995)
- Grease (2002)
- Fame (2005)
- We Will Rock You (2008)
- Spelemann på taket (2011)
