= Britt Karin Larsen =

Norwegian poet and author

Britt Karin Larsen (born 16 April 1945) is a Norwegian former model, poet, author and government scholar. Larsen debuted as a poet in 1978 with 5 mg blues og andre dikt, and has published many poetry collections and novels since. She is best known for her novel trilogy about Norwegian and Swedish Travellers, De som ser etter tegn (1997), De usynliges by (1998) and Sangen om løpende hester (1999). The trilogy has been called a literary monument for Romany people in Norway. Larsen was given the Norsk PEN's highest freedom prize, the Ossietzky-prisen, in 2000. She was awarded the Amalie Skram Prize in 2001.

== Bibliography ==
- 5 mg blues og andre dikt – poem (1978)
- Kniven skal du ta vare på – poem (1981)
- Før stengetid – poem (1983)
- Hvorfor venter vi her? – poem (1986)
- Du er likevel til. Brev til et barn som ikke ble født – letters (1989)
- Ingenting er helt som før – children's book (1990)
- I ly for regnet – novel (1990)
- Ørkenhagen – poem (1991)
- Engang var vi som vinden – prose (1991)
- Det nye havet – Children's book (1991) (Illustrated by Torill Marø Henrichsen)
- Alexanders hemmelighet – Children's book (1992)
- Ormens øye – novel (1993)
- Reise om høsten – novel (1994)
- Som snøen faller – novel (1995)
- Munnen i gresset – novel (1996)
- De som ser etter tegn – novel (1997)
- De usynliges by – novel (1998)
- Sangen om løpende hester – novel (1999)
- Å finne en skog – novel (2000)
- Vesle-Hjalmar og kilden – Children's book (2001) (Coauthor Liv Borge. Illustrated by Torill Marø Henrichsen)
- Et annet folk – novel (2001)
- Duggpunkt ved daggry – novel (2001)
- Det kan komme fine dager – novel (2002)
- Fortellinger om kjærlighet – novel (2003)
- Som kjærlighet, nesten. En bok om alkohol – prose (2004) (Coauthor Tor Georg Danielsen)
- Den humpete veien til førerkortet – non-fiction (2007)
- Vesle- Hjalmar og vinterslottet – children's book with Liv Andersen (2009)
- Det vokser et tre i Mostamägg – novel (2009)
- Himmelbjørnens skog – novel (2010)
- Som steinen skinner – novel (2011)
- Den lykkelige vandreboka – non-fiction (2011)
- Før snøen kommer – novel (2012)
- Det synger i lauvet – novel (2013)
- Slik treet faller – novel (2013)
- Kaldere mot natten – novel (2015)
- Av lys er du kommet – novel (2017)
- Berøringen – novel (2019)
- Fuglene tar ikke telefonen – short stories (2020)
- Som hunder om natta – novel (2021)
- Kanskje kommer tante Brit (2021)

== Prizes ==
- Gyldendal's Endowment 1993
- Sarpsborgprisen 1998
- Hedmark fylkeskommunes kulturpris 1998
- Ossietzky-prisen 2000
- Riksmålsforbundets litteraturpris 2001
- Amalie Skram-prisen 2001
- Dobloug Prize 2014
