= Terje Holtet Larsen =

Norwegian journalist, novelist and writer

Terje Holtet Larsen (born 30 January 1963) is a Norwegian journalist, novelist and writer of short stories. He made his literary debut in 1991 with the novel Sønnen. His novel Home is where you die, sier Mr. Saunders from 2008 was well received by the critics. He was awarded the Gyldendal's Endowment in 1995 (shared with Torgrim Eggen).
