= Terje Johanssen =

Norwegian poet (1942–2005

- Born: 4 June 1942; Svolvær, Norway
- Died: 27 May 2005 (aged 62)
- Occupation: Poet
- Awards: Gyldendal's Endowment (1983)

Terje Johanssen (4 June 1942 – 27 May 2005) was a Norwegian poet, born in Svolvær. He made his literary debut in 1975 with the poetry collection Vegen å gå. He was awarded the Gyldendal's Endowment in 1983, shared with Karin Bang.

He edited the magazine Poesi Magasin from 1983 to 1985.

== Bibliography ==
- 1975 Vegen å gå
- 1977 Hard sorg
- 1979 Glass, glødende jern
- 1980 En finger av granitt
- 1981 Jeg forklarer meg om kjærligheten mellom oss
- 1983 Blekksprutskogen
- 1984 Nytt liv
- 1986 De talende, de tause
- 1988 Fuglenes orden
- 1989 Spor av himmel
- 1990 By 1990
- 1991 Montys Restaurant. En fortelling
- 1993 Han som kommer
- 1994 I en annen verden
- 1996 Frontavsnitt
- 1997 Uttexti
- 1998 Harry og Isolde
- 1999 Frontavsnitt 2. Klagesanger
- 2001 Atlanterens klokker
- 2003 Jeg går omkring
- 2004 Slike kvelders gud
