= Arthur Omre =

Norwegian writer (1887–1967)

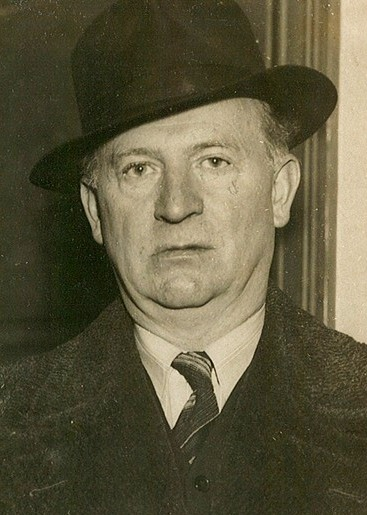
- Arthur Omre, c. 1940
- Born: Ole Arthur Antonisen; 17 December 1887; Horten, Norway
- Died: 16 August 1967 (aged 79); Porsgrunn, Norway
- Occupations: Novelist, short story writer
- Spouse: Ruth Evensen
- Writing career
- Language: Norwegian
- Notable works: Smuglere, Flukten
- Notable awards: Gyldendal's Endowment, 1938

Arthur Omre (17 December 1887, in Brunlanes Municipality – 16 August 1967) was a Norwegian novelist and writer of short stories.

Omre hailed from Vestfold. With a background as sailor, journalist, constructor in the United States, engineer in Oslo, businessman and entrepreneur, he went bankrupt in 1922. From then on he initiated a criminal career, and made a living from liquor smuggling, swindle and theft, also spending long periods in prison.

Following release from jail in 1935, Omre made his literary début with the novel Smuglere (Smugglers). The story is largely based on his own experiences, and is written in hardboiled style. Then came the follow-ups Flukten (1936), Sukkenes bro (1937) and Kristinus Bergmann (1938).

He was awarded Gyldendal's Endowment in 1938.

In 1939 he wrote the novel Intermesso, in 1940 Det onde øie, in 1941 Harmoni, and in 1942 Mysterium i Rolvsøy. He published several short story collections. Many of his short stories were first published in magazines, such as Arbeidermagasinet. In the 1950s he wrote the trilogy Mikkelfanten, Svarte-Paal and Ek & Co.

== Selected works ==
- Smuglere. 1935. (novel)
- Flukten. 1936. (novel)
- Sukkenes bro. 1937. (novel)
- Kristinus Bergmann. 1938. (novel)
- Intermesso. 1939. (novel)
- Det onde øie. 1940. (novel)
- Harmoni. 1941. (novel)
- Det hender iblandt. 1941. (short story collection)
- Mysterium i Rolvsøy. 1942. (novel)
- Stort sett pent vær. 1948. (short story collection)
- Skiftende bris. 1950. (short story collection)
- Gullmyntene og andre historier. 1954. (short story collection)
