= Thor Sørheim =

Norwegian author (born 1949)

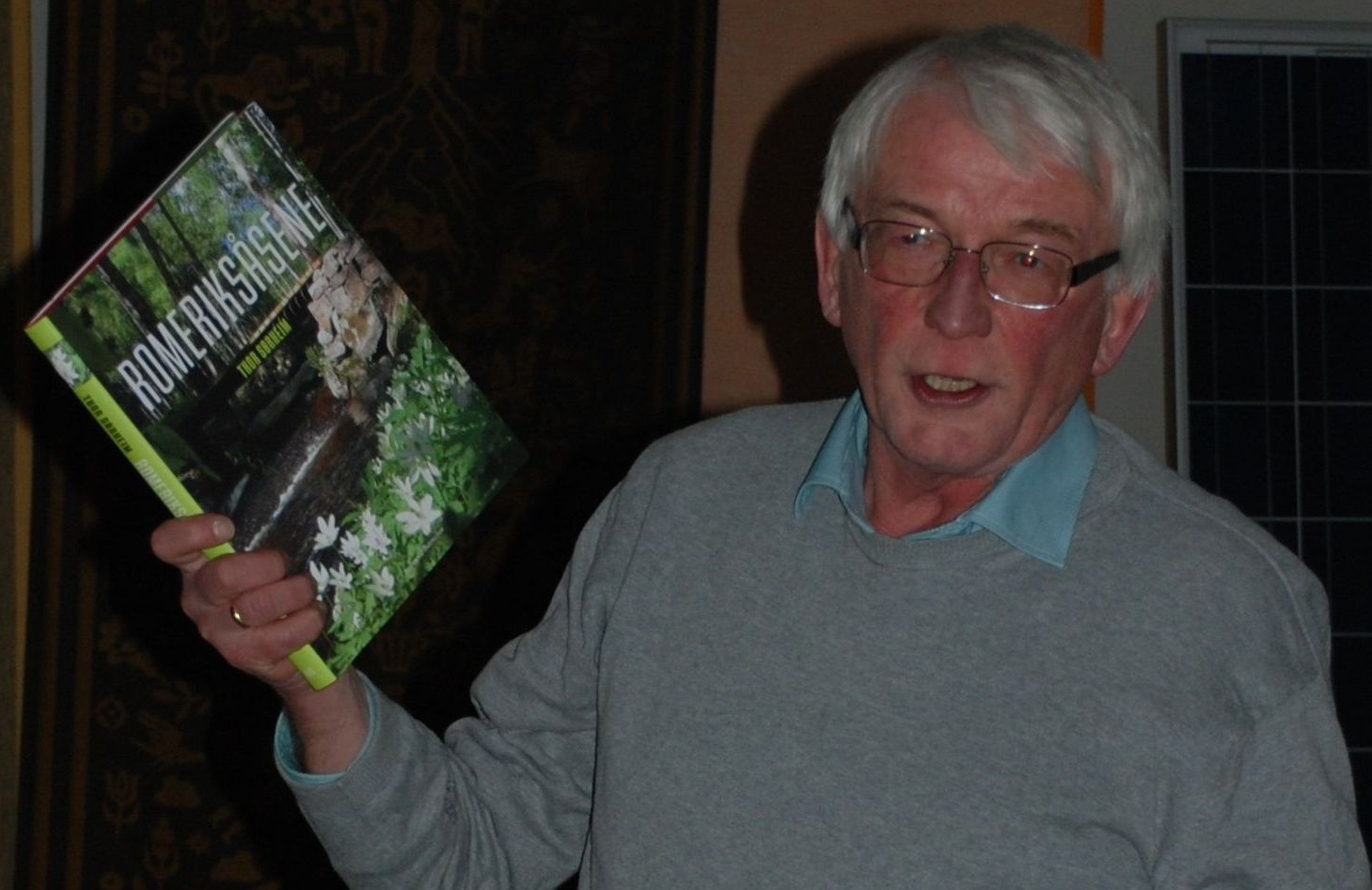
Thor Sørheim

Thor Sørheim (born 1 February 1949) is a Norwegian author and 1986 recipient of the Olav Dalgards Prize.
