= Tormod Haugen =

Norwegian children's writer (1945–2008)

Tormod Haugen

Tormod Haugen (12 May 1945 – 18 October 2008) was a Norwegian writer of children's books and translator. For his "lasting contribution to children's literature" he received the international Hans Christian Andersen Medal in 1990.

== Biography ==
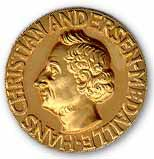
Tormod Haugen, winner of the Hans Christian Andersen Award (1990)

Tormod Haugen grew up in Nybergsund, a small village in Trysil Municipality in Hedmark county, Norway. After school graduation at the Hamar Cathedral School in 1965, he attended the University of Oslo. He worked at the Munch Museum from 1971 to 1973. He made his debut as a writer in 1973, with Ikke som i fjor (Not like last year). After his debut, he wrote a number of books for children and young adults, and he became one of the more acclaimed writers of children's literature in Scandinavia.

He was an experimental and innovative writer who picked up elements from Norwegian folk tales and myths, as well as from international children's literary traditions. A recurring theme in his writing was the lonely child whose feelings and wishes are disregarded by the adult world, and who, as a consequence of this, winds up in situations that are outside of his control. His books have been sold to 26 countries and translated into 24 languages. He was also an active translator. Among his works, he translated the Narnia books of C. S. Lewis into the Norwegian language.

== Awards ==
The biennial Hans Christian Andersen Award conferred by the International Board on Books for Young People is among the highest recognitions available to a writer or illustrator of children's books. Haugen received the writing award in 1990.

In 1984, he became the first children's author nominated for the Nordic Council Literature Prize. He won the prize of the Nordic School Librarians Association in 1986. He was nominated for the Norwegian Booksellers' Prize in 1997 and for the international Astrid Lindgren Memorial Award in 2005.

- 1979, Norwegian Critics Prize for Literature
- 1979, Deutscher Jugendliteraturpreis
- 1980, Gyldendal's Endowment
- 1988, Bastian Prize for Children's and Young-Adult Books

== Works ==
- 1973 – Ikke som i fjor
- 1974 – Til sommeren – kanskje
- 1975 – Nattfuglene
- 1976 – Zeppelin
- 1977 – Synnadrøm
- 1979 – Joakim
- 1980 – Slottet Det Hvite
- 1983 – Dagen som forsvant
- 1984 – Vinterstedet
- 1986 – Romanen om Merkel Hansen og Donna Winter og den store flukten
- 1988 – Farlig ferd
- 1989 – Skriket fra jungelen
- 1991 – Øglene kommer
- 1992 – Tsarens juveler
- 1993 – På sporet av frøken Detektiv
- 1996 – Georg og Gloria (og Edvard)
- 1997 – Hjerte og smerte (og Taj Mahal)
- 1998 – Hellou og guddbai (og høstens regn)
- 1999 – Luftvandreren
- 2001 – I lyset fra fullmånen
- 2002 – Prinsusse Klura og dragen
- 2005 – Doris Day og tordnvær
