= Astrid Tollefsen =

Norwegian poet (1897–1973)

- Born: 11 December 1897; Horten, Norway
- Died: 9 October 1973 (aged 75)
- Occupation: Poet
- Awards: Gyldendal's Endowment (1958); Norwegian Critics Prize for Literature (1967)

Astrid Tollefsen (11 December 1897 – 9 October 1973) was a Norwegian poet. She was born in Horten. She made her literary debut with the poetry collection Portrett i speil (1947). She lived in a long-term relationship with the lyricist Gunvor Hofmo.

Tollefsen was awarded the Norwegian Critics Prize for Literature in 1967 for the poetry collection Hendelser.

== Awards ==
- Gyldendal's Endowment 1958
- Norwegian Critics Prize for Literature 1967
