= Kristofer Uppdal =

Norwegian poet and author

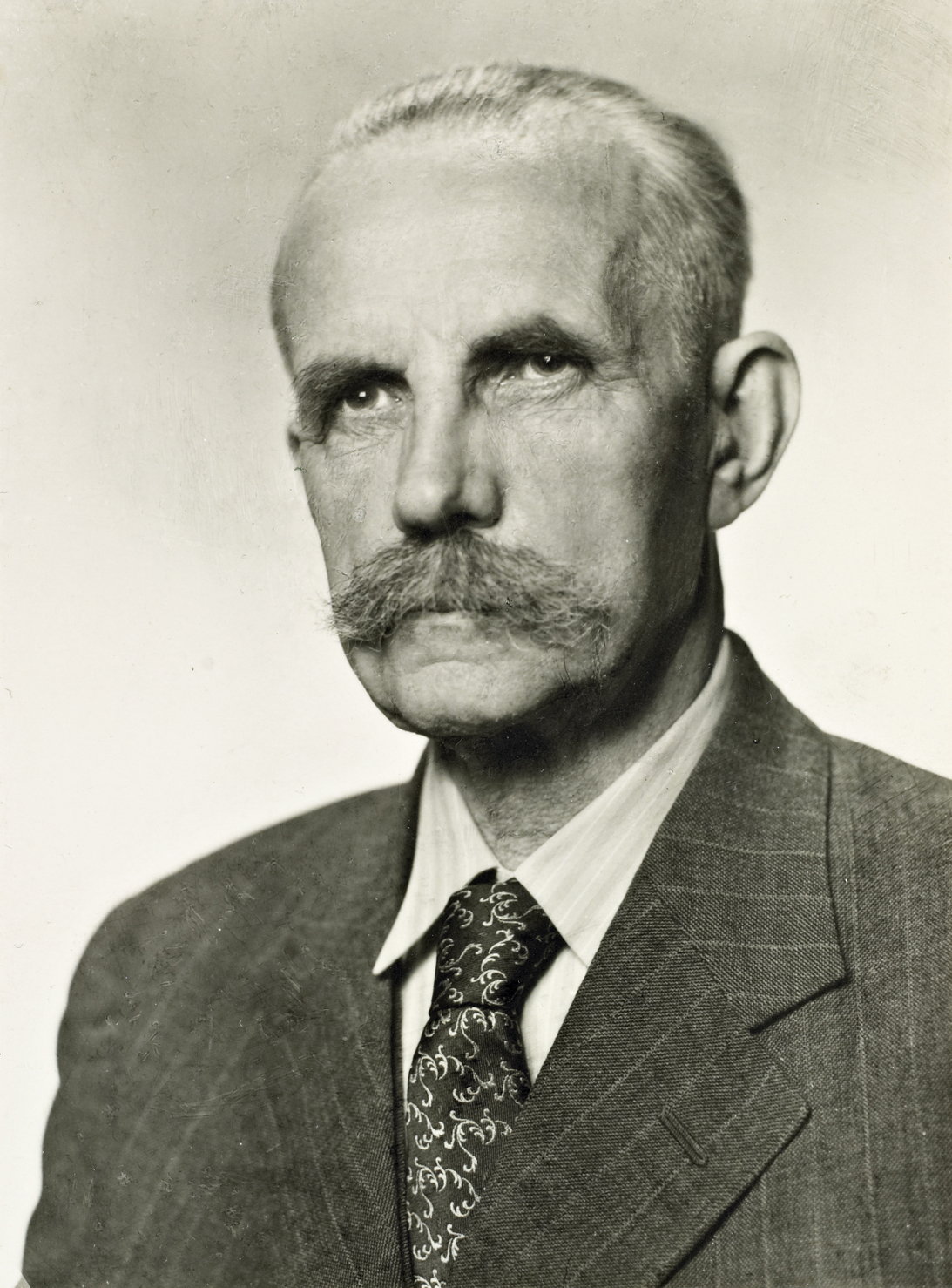
- Uppdal in 1953
- Born: 19 February 1878; Beitstad, Steinkjer, Norway
- Died: 26 December 1961 (aged 83); Oppdal, Norway
- Occupations: Poet and author

Kristofer Oliver Uppdal (19 February 1878 – 26 December 1961), born Opdal, was a Norwegian poet and author, born in Beitstad, Nord-Trøndelag.

As a boy, Uppdal worked as a shepherd, and later as a miner and construction worker. In 1907 he started working for Norsk Hydro, and came to their factory in Rjukan in 1910-1911. In 1905, he debuted with Ung sorg (Young sorrow) and Kvæde (Songs), collections of poetry, followed by Sollaug in 1908, and Villfuglar (Wild birds) in 1909.

With the short-stories collection Ved Akerselva (By the Aker River) in 1910, Uppdal introduced his epic 10-volume series of novels, Dansen gjenom skuggeheimen (The Dance through the Shadow Land). Here listed are the separate volumes in the order that Uppdal himself later designated and explained in the preface to Herdsla, along with year of publication:

- (1919) Stigeren (The Foreman of the Miners)
- (1912/1922) Trolldom i lufta (Witchcraft in the Air)
- (1923) Vandringa (The Wander) [a revision of Ved Akerselva]
- (1920) Kongen (The King)
- (1911/1921) Dansen gjenom skuggeheimen (The Dance through the Shadow Land)
- (1921) Domkyrkjebyggaren (The Cathedral Builder)
- (1922) I skiftet (In the change)
- (1914/1923) Røysingfolket (The Røysing People)
- (1924) Fjelskjeringa (The Mountain Trench)
- (1924) Herdsla (The Toughening)

Uppdal seems to have decided to link the stories together in hindsight, as he outlined the plan in the last volume, Herdsla, and thus revised and republish the three volumes first published so they'd fit the puzzle. His intent, by his own statements, was to describe the dawn of the working class, its severance from its origins (the peasantry), the proletarization, and finally the modern worker and the worker movement. At the same time, Uppdal claimed he was not a "proletarian poet;" his main purpose was to describe the human being.

Two of the volumes were republished in revised editions in the 1950s, in which Uppdal (in addition to expanding the narrative considerably, and emphasizing the political agenda) had changed the language used into a more archaic and dialectal form. These editions didn't win any acclaim, and later editions of the series in the 1970s and 1985-91 were made from the 1919-24 editions.

Uppdal was also an important lyric poet. He gathered his finest poetry of youth and adulthood in Elskhug (Love) in 1919, and Altarelden (The Altar Fire) in 1920. Of his poetry, Johs. A. Dale has written that "It has a primitive strength and a masculine self-assertion, and is marked by suffering and conflict of the soul." Uppdal was finally granted a poet's pension by the state in 1939, perhaps due to his long periods of financial hardship.

When confronted with his difficult prose and asked if he had plans to make his novels more audience-friendly, he is said to have responded: "I don't give a damn about the audience! Don't give a hoot about what anyone else says, be yourself even if it should take you straight to the pits of Hell."
