= Ragnvald Skrede =

Norwegian writer (1904–1983)

Ragnvald Skrede (24 April 1904 – 16 August 1983) was a Norwegian author, journalist, literature critic and translator.

== Biography ==
Ragnvald Skrede was born in Vågå Municipality in Oppland county, Norway. Skrede was the youngest of seven children. He was a student at Elverum teacher school (1921–24). In 1928, he was hired as a teacher and sexton in Rauland Municipality in Telemark. He studied at the University of Oslo (1928–1934). In 1934, he became a teacher in Vågå Municipality. In the postwar years, Skrede worked as a journalist and literary critic for Verdens Gang and Dagbladet and a theater critic for Bondebladet.

Skrede was 45 years old when he began his writing in the year 1949. As a poet, he often used the classic and permanent stanza forms. His authorship was humanistic and characterized by historic knowledge. Ragnvald Skrede was a Norwegian member of the jury for the Nordic Council's Literature Prize from 1969. He was chairman for literary advice of the Norwegian Novelist Association (Den norske forfattarforening) 1970–72. He received Dobloug Prize for Literature in 1967 and the Norwegian Cultural Council Award in 1969.

== Bibliography ==
- Tarjei Vesaas – biography (1947)
- Det du ikkje veit – poetry (1949)
- I open båt på havet – poetry (1952)
- Bjørg – radioplay, NRK radio (1954)
- Den kvite fuglen – poetry (1955)
- Bak dei siste blånar – poetry (1961)
- Frå kjelde til sjø – poetry (1962)
- Mellom romarar – poetry (1963)
- Den gleda du skal leva på – selected poetry (1964)
- Grunnmalm – poetry (1966)
- Lauvfall – poetry (1969)
- Dikt i utval – selected poetry (1969)
- Vintersvale – poetry (1970)
- Flyttfuglar – poetry (1971)
- Gamaldans – poetry (1973)
- Brenning – poetry (1975)

== Prizes and recognition ==
- Norwegian Critics Prize for Literature (Kritikerprisen) 1952, for I åpen båt på havet
- Sunnmørsprisen, 1962, for Frå kjelde til sjø
- Sokneprest Alfred Andersson-Ryssts fond 1963
- Dobloug Prize 1967
