= Kåre Holt =

Norwegian writer

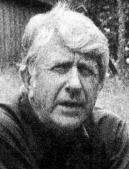
Kåre Holt at his Holmestrand home in 1980

Kåre Holt (10 October 1916 – 15 March 1997) was a Norwegian author. He wrote plays, poetry and about forty books.

== Biography ==
Holt was born in Våle Municipality in Vestfold, Norway. His parents were Peder Anton Kristiansen (1870-1958) and Mathilde Sofie Larsen Rønningen (1871-1945). He worked for some time as a journalist at Vestfold Arbeiderblad.

His initial work was published in 1939, a children's book named Tore Kramkar. As his career progressed, Holt wrote many children's books, plays, radio plays, biographies, and historical novels. The trilogy Kongen about King Sverre Sigurdsson is considered his principal work. He is also remembered for his mythologically-based novels about icons of Norwegian history, among others Kappløpet about Roald Amundsen which created a sensation when it was published in 1974.

Holt won The Norwegian Critics Prize for Literature 1954, for Mennesker ved en grense. Holt was nominated three times for The Nordic Council's Literature Prize (Nordisk Råds litteraturpris): in 1966 for the novel Kongen—Mannen fra utskjæret, in 1970 for the novel Kongen—Hersker og trell and in 1979 for the novel Sønn av jord og himmel. Holt was made a Knight 1st Class in the Order of St. Olav in 1991. He died during 1997 in Holmestrand Municipality in Vestfold. In 2007, a bust of the author by artist Ada Madssen was unveiled in front of his former house at Reidvintunet, an open-air museum in the village of Hillestad in Holmestrand.

== Bibliography ==
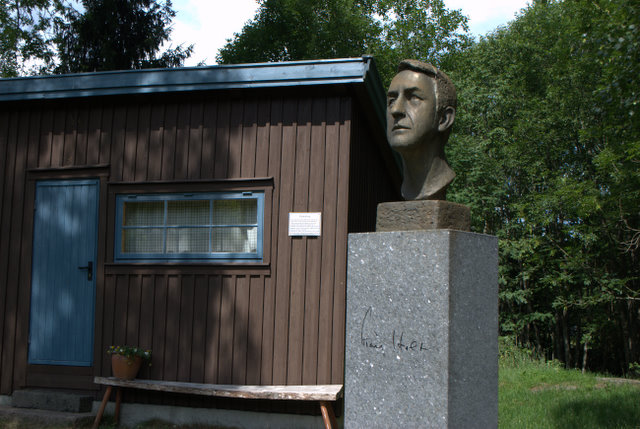
Kåre Holt bust at Reidvintunet in Holmestrand

- Tore Kramkar – (1939)
- Tore finner vei – (1940)
- Spillemann og kjøgemester – (1941)
- Udåden – (1945)
- Hurra for han som innstifta da'n – a biography of Henrik Wergeland for young people (1945)
- Demring – (1946)
- Nattgjester – novel (1948)
- Cleng Peerson og Nils med luggen – teen book (1948)
- Det store veiskillet – novel (1949)
- Brødre – novel (1951)
- Hevnen hører meg til – novel (1953)
- Mennesker ved en grense – novel (1954)
- Det stolte nederlag – novel (1956)
- Natt ved sjøen – radioplay (1956)
- Storm under morgenstjerne – novel (1958)
- Rømlingen Oskar og Maria fra Hulesjøen – teen novel (1959)
- Opprørere ved havet – novel (1960)
- Den gamle veien til Kierlighed – stories (1961)
- Perlefiskeren – novel (1963)
- Mannen fra utskjæret – novel (1965) (about King Sverre Sigurdsson)
- Fredløse menn – novel (1967) (about King Sverre Sigurdsson)
- Hersker og trell – novel (1969) (about King Sverre Sigurdsson)
- Kristina av Tunsberg – play (1971)
- Oppstandelsen – novel (1971)
- Ansikter i sagaens halvlys – (1971) (illustrated by Karl Erik Harr)
- Farvel til en kvinne – novel (1972) (about the queen buried at Oseberg)
- Hilsen fra Rafnaberg – collection of articles (1973)
- Folket ved Svansjøen – prose collection (1973)
- Kappløpet – novel (1974) (about Roald Amundsen)
- Sjøhelten – novel (1975) (about Peter Wessel Tordenskiold)
- De lange mil til paradiset – novel (1977)
- Sønn av jord og himmel – novel (1978) (about Hans Egede)
- Skuddet – criminal novel (1979) (about Claus Jæger)
- Gjester fra det ukjente – novel (1980)
- Biter av et bilde – drawings (1981)
- Mørke smil – satire (1981)
- Sannferdig beretning om mitt liv som løgner – autobiography (1982)
- Veien videre. Ny sannferdig beretning om mitt liv som løgner – autobiography (1983)
- Skoggangsmann – (1984) (about Rottenikken)
- Budbringeren fra Tunsberg – teen novel (1985)
- Flyktningen fra Stiklestad – teen novel (1986)
- Vandringen – novel (1986) (about Fridtjof Nansen)
- Det finnes en kvinne i Nevada for hvem jeg ha løyet – collection of articles (1995)

== Prizes ==
- Norwegian Culture and Religious Department prize for young peoples literature for Cleng Peerson og Nils med luggen - 1948
- The Norwegian Critics Prize for Literature for Mennesker ved en grense - 1954
- Språklig samlings litteraturpris - 1966
- Gyldendal's Endowment - 1967
- Sarpsborgprisen - 1967
- Dobloug Prize - 1970
- Sproingprisen for Kristina av Tunsberg - 1991
- Norwegian Culture and Religious Department prize for young peoples literature for Kristina av Tunsberg - 1991
