= Pål Sundvor =

Norwegian journalist and writer

- Born: 8 September 1920; Fusa Municipality, Norway
- Died: 11 November 1992 (aged 72)
- Occupations: Journalist and writer

Pål Sundvor (8 September 1920 – 11 November 1992) was a Norwegian journalist, novelist, children's writer, poet and playwright. He was born in Fusa Municipality, and made his literary début in 1947 with the children's book Ola frå garden. Among his other works are the novel Fangen er fri from 1960, the poetry collection Loffarens vise from 1962, and the play Kurdarspel from 1978. He was awarded the Gyldendal's Endowment in 1975.
