= Emil Boyson =

Norwegian poet, writer and translator

Emil Boyson (4 September 1897 – 2 June 1979) was a Norwegian poet, writer, and translator.

== Biography ==
Carl Emil Steen Boyson was born in Bergen, Norway. His parents were Immanuel Boysen (1854–1921) and Christine Steen (1869–1905). He grew up as a single child after his siblings died in childbirth. His mother died when he was nine years old. His father was a jurist who was stationed in various places: Bergen, Trondheim, Røros and finally in Kristiania. In 1906, his father was appointed at Uttrøndelag in Trondheim. In 1913 the family moved to Kristiania (now Oslo). In 1917, he obtained artium at Kristiana Cathedral School. In 1923 he married Friedel Schatz (1897–1975). They were married in Berlin where she was employed as an artist. The couple frequently lived apart until 1963, when they established residence on Hans Nielsen Hauges gate in Oslo.

His actual debut was in 1920 under the pseudonym Karl Snemo, with publication of Åpning til regnbuen. Boyson formally debuted in 1927 with a prose book Sommertørst. He was primarily known for his poetry. His poetry was written in a modernistic style, with a language differing from everyday language, but often maintaining traditional form and stanza patterns.

Emil Boyson also completed an anthology with fellow author Asbjørn Aarnes (1923-2013). Norsk poesi fra Henrik Wergeland til Nordahl Grieg. En antologi was published by Gyldendal in 1961. The anthology covered over a century of Norwegian literature from the early writings of Henrik Wergeland who was born in 1808 to the final works of Nordahl Grieg who died in 1943. The chapters profiled the writings of twenty-four Norwegian authors and included such literary greats is Bjornstjerne Bjornson, Sigrid Undset and Knut Hamsun.

== Bibliography ==
- Åpning til regnbuen – poetry (1920)
- Sommertørst: En historie – novel (1927)
- Skumring mellom søiler – poetry (1932)
- Varsler og møter – poetry (1934)
- Tegn og tydning – poetry (1935)
- Yngre herre på besøk: En fabel – novel (1936)
- Vandring mot havet: En prosa-diktning – novel (1937)
- Gjemt i mørket – poetry (1939)
- Sjelen og udyret – poetry (1946)
- Gjenkjennelse – dpoetry (1957)
- Utvalgte dikt – collected poetry (1959)
- 70 dikt – collected poetry(1974)
- Før sporene slettes: dagbok – poetry (1981) (illustrated by Kåre Tveter)

== Prizes ==
- Gyldendal's Endowment - 1946
- Dobloug Prize - 1956
- Critics Prize - 1957
- Riksmålsforbundets litteraturpris - 1959
- Gyldendal's Endowment - 1974
