= Mari Osmundsen =

Norwegian novelist and children's writer

- Born: 20 June 1951 (age 75); Molde, Norway
- Other names: Anne Kristine Halling; Kia Halling
- Occupations: Novelist; Children's writer Translator
- Awards: Gyldendal's Endowment

Mari Osmundsen is the literary pseudonym of Anne Kristine Halling (born 20 June 1951), a Norwegian novelist and children's writer. She made her literary debut in 1978 with the novel Vi klarer det!. According to literary historian Øystein Rottem, this and her next novel, På vei mot himmelen (1979) are both pure social realism in the spirit of the Maoist movement AKP (m-l).

In 1982 she published the short story collection Wow, where she combined feminist problems with dreamlike elements, as well as the children's book Den grønne damen. En nifs historie for barn og foreldre, where a family is hunted by a ghost with an old-fasioned view of women. The novel Gode gjerninger (1984) focuses on issues such as neo-Nazism and racism, and also contains elements of fantasy.

Osmundsen was awarded the Gyldendal's Endowment in 1984 (shared with Simen Skjønsberg).
