= Tor Ulven =

Norwegian poet

Tor Ulven (14 November 1953 – 18 May 1995) was a Norwegian poet. He is considered one of the major poets of the Norwegian post-war era, and won several major literary prizes in Norwegian literature.

== Biography ==
Tor Arvid Ulven was born in Oslo, Norway. He published several poetry collections before he began writing prose. Ulven published Skyggen av urfuglen the first of five collections of poetry in 1977. His early works, consisting of traditional modernist verse poetry, were heavily influenced by the writings of French writer and poet André Breton (1896–1966) and the surrealism movement. As the 1980s progressed he developed a more independent voice, both stylistically and thematically. The later part of his work consists mainly of prose. He wrote a number of essays dealing with literature, philosophy, music and visual arts.

For a number of years he had lived in relative physical isolation due to illness. He committed suicide in 1995 in Oslo.

== Influence ==
In Joachim Trier's 2006 film Reprise Tor Ulven is mentioned by Philip as a writer that influenced him and is the inspiration for the character Sten Egil Dahl. In Karl Ove Knausgård's My Struggle II, Knausgård is filled with excitement when his prose is compared to Ulven's.

== Awards ==
- Dobloug prize - 1995
- Obstfelder prize - 1993
- Hartvig Kirans prize - 1990

== Bibliography ==
- 1977: Skyggen av urfuglen [‘The shadow of the primeval bird’] (poems)
- 1980: Etter oss, tegn [‘After us, signs’] (poems)
- 1981: Forsvinningspunkt [‘Point of disappearance’] (poems)
- 1987: Det tålmodige [‘Patience’; literally ‘the patient [thing/phenomenon]’ (poems and prose poems)
- 1988: Gravgaver [‘Grave goods’] (prose)
- 1989: Søppelsolen [‘Trash sun’] (poems)
- 1990: Nei, ikke det [‘No, not that’] (short stories)
- 1991: Fortæring [‘Depletion’] (prose poems)
- 1993: Avløsning (novel) - Replacement (English translation, 2012)
- 1994: Vente og ikke se [‘Wait and not see’] (short stories)
- 1995: Stein og speil [‘Rock and mirror’] (prose poems)
- 1997: Essays
