= Gunnar Larsen (writer) =

Norwegian writer (1900–1958)

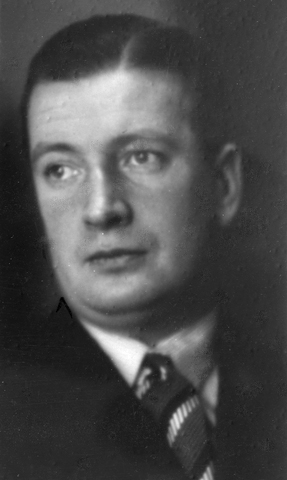
- Born: Gunnar Otterbech Larsen; 1900; Oslo
- Died: 1958 (aged 57–58); Oslo
- Occupation: Editor in Chief
- Employer: Dagbladet
- Known for: Journalist and Novelist

Gunnar Otterbech Larsen (5 February 1900, in Oslo – 5 November 1958) was a Norwegian journalist, writer, and translator.

He worked in the newspaper Dagbladet from 1923 to 1958, where he was news editor from 1930 and became editor-in-chief with Helge Seip in 1954.

His first novel, I sommer, was published in 1932. It was followed by To mistenkelige personer (1933), a crime novel based on actual events that took place in 1926. To mistenkelige personer was praised by many critics, including Sigurd Hoel. Both I sommer and To mistenkelige personer were inspired by Ernest Hemingway's writings.

Larsen's third novel, Week-end i evigheten (1934), was much more experimental. His later novels were Bull (1938) and Sneen som falt i fjor (1948). His poetry has been published in the books Dikt (1959) and En avismanns samlede poesi (2000).

A film version of To mistenkelige personer was directed by Tancred Ibsen in 1950, but showing the film in public was forbidden in the Supreme Court of Norway in 1952, in order to protect one of the persons whose story it was based on. In 2007, the film was allowed to be shown in public again.

== Awards ==
- Gyldendal's Endowment for 1949
