= Kaj Skagen =

Norwegian writer (born 1949)

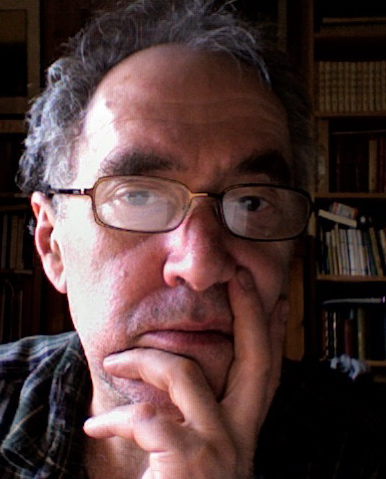
Kaj Skagen

Kaj Skagen (born October 23, 1949, in Strandebarm Municipality) is a Norwegian writer. He received the Riksmål Society Literature Prize in 1991. His first book Gatedikt was published in 1971. From 1978 to 1989, he published and edited the periodical "Arken". In 1982 he won the first prize of a national novel contest with the novel Broene brenner. In 1983 he published Bazarovs barn, a harsh critique of contemporary Norwegian literature.
