= Jan Jakob Tønseth =

Norwegian author, poet, and translator (1947–2018)

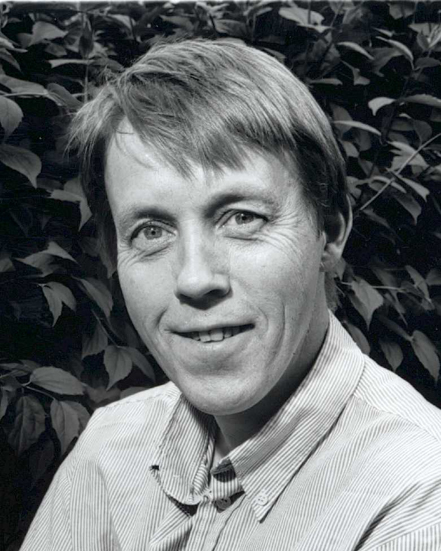
- Tønseth in 2007
- Born: 1 September 1947; Oslo, Norway
- Died: 12 October 2018 (aged 71)
- Occupations: Author, poet and translator

Jan Jakob Tønseth (1 September 1947 – 12 October 2018) was a Norwegian author, poet and translator.

Tønseth debuted as a poet with the poetry collection Kimærer in 1971, when he was only 24 years of age. He achieved broad recognition as a novelist with his trilogy about the ex-communist Hilmar Iversen (Hilmar Iversens ensomhet (1992), Et vennskap (1997) and Resignasjon og portvin (2002)). Tønseth was a member of Norwegian Academy for Language and Literature.

== Bibliography ==
=== Poetry ===
- Kimærer – poetry collection (1971)
- I denne tid – poetry collection, (1974)
- Synlige dikt – poetry collection (1977)
- Referanser (fjerne og nære) – poetry collection (1979)
- Lengsel og lede – poetry collection (1987)
- Motgift – poetry collection (1994)
- Fromme vers for enkle sjeler – poetry collection (2008) ISBN 978-82-02-28679-8

=== Prose ===
- Drømmer og løgner – prose (1982)
- På krigsfot med virkeligheten – essay collection (1984)
- Antagelser – (1984), together with John David Nielsen (malerier) )
- Hilmar Iversens ensomhet – novel (1992) )
- Et vennskap – novel (1997)
- En rar skrue – biography of Kjell Aukrust (2000)
- Resignasjon og portvin – novel (2002)
- Dikteren på terskelen – essays (2005)
- Von Aschenbachs fristelse – short story collection (2006)

=== Translated poetry ===
- Arthur Rimbaud: Illuminasjoner (1981), together with Arne Kjell Haugen
- Stéphane Mallarmé: Utvalgte tekster (1983), together with Arne Kjell Haugen
- Guillaume Apollinaire: Alkoholer (1985), together with Arne Kjell Haugen
- Henri Michaux: Mellom sentrum og fravær (1989), together with Arne Kjell Haugen
- Guillaume Apollinaire: Dyreboken eller Orfeus´ følge (originally ‘’Le bestiaire ou le cortège d’Orphée’’) (1998)
- José Hierro: New York-notater (2004)
- Édouard Glissant: De vestindiske øyer (2005)
- Roberto Bolaño: De noveltiske hundene (2008), together with Kristina Solum

== Prizes and recognition ==
- Gyldendals legat 1977
- Norwegian Critics Prize for Literature 1990
- P2-lytternes novelpris 1997
- Cappelenprisen 2002
- Dobloug Prize 2007

Awards
Preceded by Anne Holt	Recipient of the Cappelen Prize; 2002	Succeeded by Karin Fossum
