= Finn Bjørnseth =

Norwegian writer (1924–1973)

- Born: 15 July 1924; Oslo, Norway
- Died: 31 October 1973 (aged 49)
- Occupations: Novelist, poet and short story writer
- Awards: Gyldendal's Endowment (1960)

Finn Bjørnseth (15 July 1924 – 31 October 1973) was a Norwegian novelist, poet and short story writer.

== Biography ==
Finn Bjørnseth was born in Oslo, Norway. He made his literary début in 1950 with the short story collection Unge netter. Among his poetry collections are 60-tallsballade from 1960, and Vuggevise for aftenlandet from 1962. He was awarded the Gyldendal's Endowment in 1960.

Bjørnseth died on 31 October 1973.

== Selected works ==
- Før vingene bærer (1952)
- De tre diktsyklusene Syv septimer (1954)
- Vandreren (1955)
- Til minne om en klode (1955)
- Et ildens barn (1960)
- Den innerste esken (1966)
- Hans Eksellense hadde tre sønner (1969)
- Noen å være glad i (1959)
- En barhodet pike (1961)
- Fordi (1963)
- Fra de nakne ordene (1965)
- Logos (1972)
