= Ernst Orvil =

Norwegian writer

- Born: 12 April 1898; Kristiania, Norway
- Died: 16 June 1985 (aged 87)
- Occupations: Novelist, short story writer, poet and playwright
- Awards: Gyldendal's Endowment; Aschehoug Prize; Riksmål Society Literature Prize

Ernst Orvil (née Ernst Richard Nilsen; 12 April 1898 – 16 June 1985) was a Norwegian novelist, short story writer, poet and playwright.

== Biography ==
Ernst Richard Orvil was born in Kristiania (now Oslo), Norway. His parents Johan Nilsen (Rev. Nilsson) (1859–1957) and Sara-Lisa Pettersson (1864–1940), were both from Värmland, Sweden. He graduated artium at the Kristiania cathedral school in 1917. Later he was an engineering student at the Norwegian Institute of Technology in Trondheim.

He made his literary debut with the novel Birger in 1932, followed by six annual releases in this same genre. His first poetry collection was Bølgeslag (1940). His more notable works include Menneskebråk (1936), Hvit uro (1937) and Synøve selv (1946).

Orvil was awarded Gyldendal's Endowment in 1946. He received the Aschehoug Prize in 1979. He was awarded the Riksmål Society Literature Prize in 1984.
