= Georg Johannesen =

Norwegian author and professor

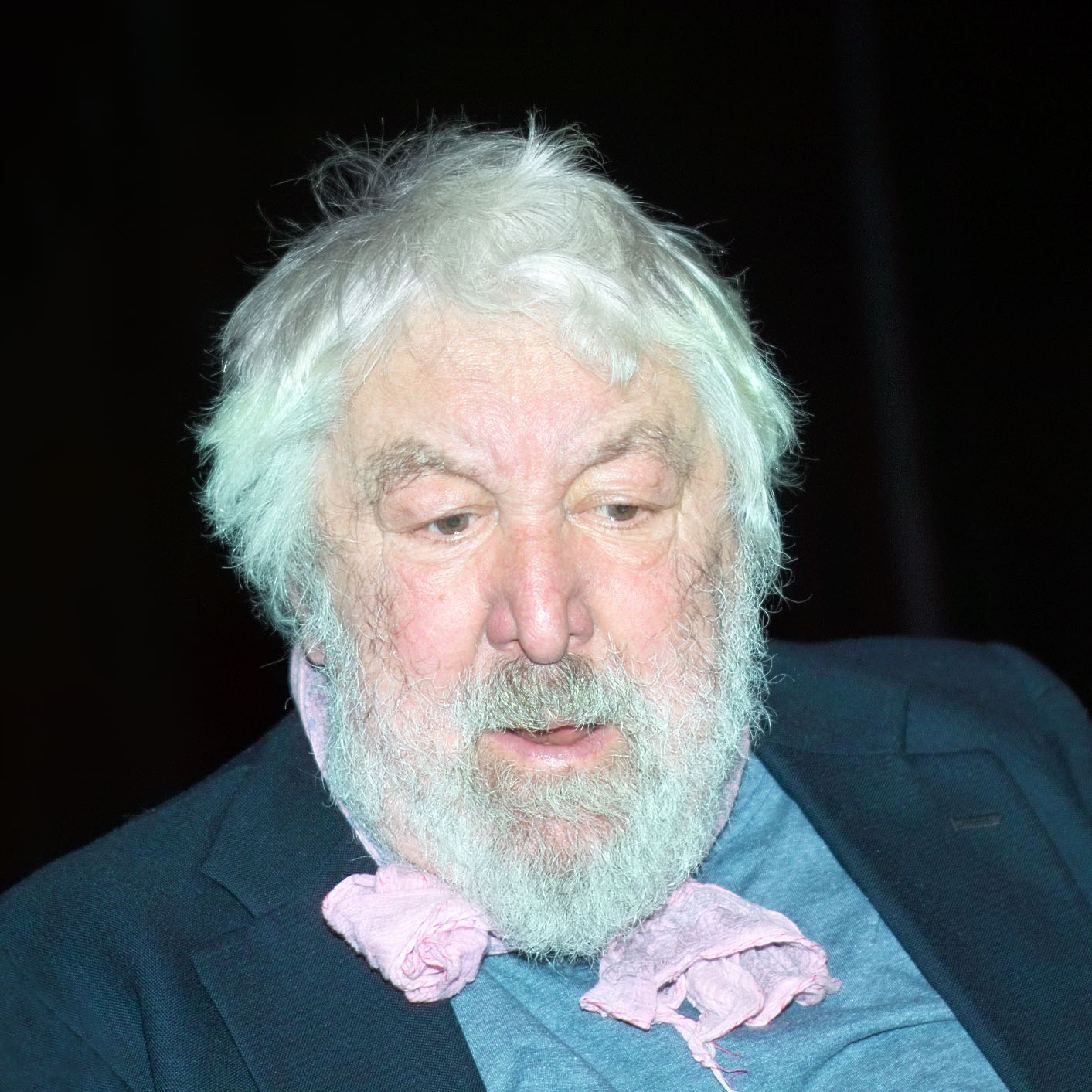
- Born: 22 February 1931; Bergen, Norway
- Died: 24 December 2005 (aged 74); Egypt
- Education: University of Oslo
- Occupations: Author, academic
- Writing career
- Period: 1957–2005
- Genres: Poetry; Novels

Georg Johannesen (22 February 1931 – 24 December 2005) was a Norwegian author and professor at the University of Bergen.

== Background ==
He was born in Bergen, Norway. He was the son of Knut Johan Johannesen (1900–1979) and Ingeborg Malene Olsdatter Skaalevik (1902–1981). Johannesen graduated artium at Bergen Cathedral School in 1949. He studied history, English and Norwegian at University of Oslo and took his master's degree in Literature History in 1960. He wrote his dissertation Vårmotivet hos Olaf Bull on the poetry of Olaf Bull (1883–1933).

From 1960 to 1963, he was a high school lecturer and 1964–69 a freelance author and writer. In 1969 he joined the University of Bergen as assistant teacher at the Nordic Institute. He was a senior lecturer in Scandinavian literature from 1977, associate professor in 1981–86 and in 1996 he was appointed professor in rhetoric.

He drowned while on vacation in Egypt in 2005.

== Writing career ==
Georg Johannesen's entered the literary scene with a novel, Høst i mars ( (1957), a tender love story with a tragic denouement about romance in the face of bourgeois prejudice. The novel was followed by three collections of poetry. The first of these, Dikt 1959 (1959), deals with temporal subjects. The second collection, Ars moriendi (1965), is structured around a rigid formal arrangement inspired by the Seven deadly sins of Christianity. The last, Nye dikt (1966) is more politically driven.

Johannesen stirred controversy in 1967 with his play Kassandra. The play was attacked for its blasphemous content and caused an uproar when it was first performed at the Det Norske Teatret. The play shows Johannesen's genius of creating a socially critical work.

Johannesen's love for paradox and delivering political messages in his work continued in Tredje kongebok (1978), Johannes' bok (1978) and Simons bok (1980). These works were laden with paradox and irony, literary devices Johannesen often worked with. These works were allegorical, shedding light on some of contemporary Norway's problems. The Norwegian drilling for offshore oil was presented in a satirical manner in the novel Mongstad (1989), which Johannesen published under the pseudonym Kathy Johns.

All his writing shows an interest in the power that language has to enshroud true meaning. Johannesen's most important task was to unveil language. His essays show a certain fondness for paradox. Both his plays and his poems bear evidence of inspiration from the work of German dramatist and poet, Bertolt Brecht (1898–1956).

== Awards ==
- Gyldendal's Endowment – 1966
- Diktartavla – 1997
- Cappelen Prize – 1999
- Halldis Moren Vesaas Prize – 1999
- Norwegian Academy Prize in memory of Thorleif Dahl – 2000

Awards
Preceded by Erlend Loe	Recipient of the Cappelen Prize; 1999	Succeeded by Gro Dahle
