= Gidske Anderson =

Norwegian journalist, editor and author

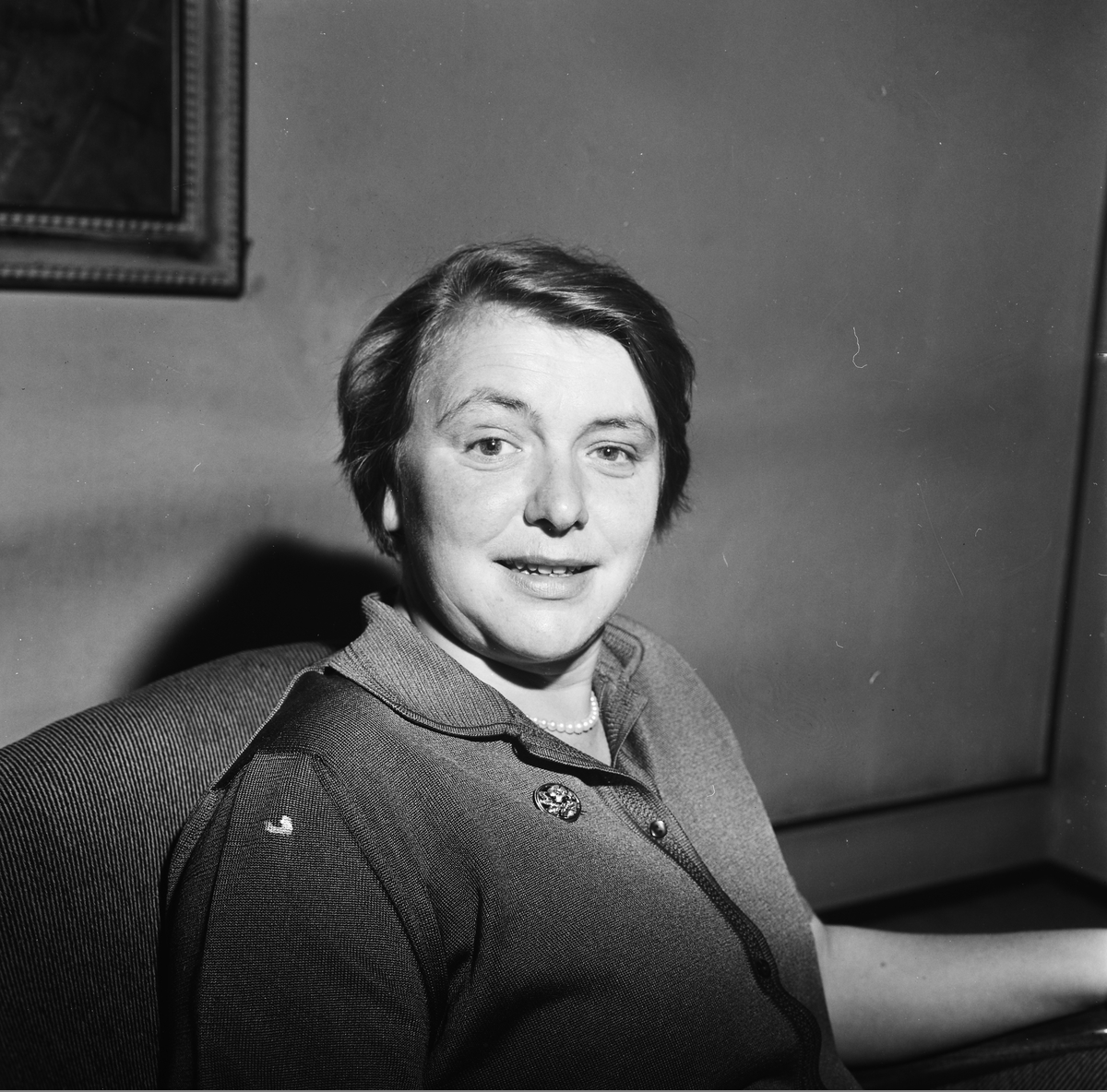
Gidske Anderson in 1964

Gidske Anderson (4 November 1921 – 19 October 1993) was a Norwegian journalist, editor and author.

== Biography ==
She was born in Oslo, Norway to Yngve Anderson (1892-–1981) and Gidske Halvorsen (1895–1985). She studied at Aars og Voss skole and graduated from the State Teachers' School (Statens teiknelärarskole) at Notodden. She worked for the Norwegian Broadcasting Corporation (NRK) and then the newspaper Arbeiderbladet (1954–64) in Paris. From 1964 to 1967 she was a freelance journalist in the United States. She became editor of the foreign affairs section of Arbeiderbladet from 1967 to 1972, and then was Paris correspondent for NRK from 1973 to 1975.

She debuted as an author with Mørk fest in 1962 and wrote memoirs, biographies and poetry. She published her autobiography Det hendte meg in 1983 and authored biographies on Norwegian Foreign Minister Halvard Lange (1902–1970), Norwegian Prime Minister Trygve Bratteli (1910–1984) and Nobel Prize-winning novelist Sigrid Undset (1882–1949).

In 1962, she received the Narvesen Prize (Narvesen prisen) for print and broadcasting journalism. She sat on the Norwegian Nobel Committee from 1981 to 1993, and chaired it in part of 1990 following the death of Egil Aarvik (1912-1990). The remaining period she was the committee's first deputy chair.

She died in October 1993 and was buried at Vestre gravlund in Oslo.

== Selected works ==
- Mørk fest, 1962
- Mennesker i Paris, 1964
- En reise i Amerika, 1968
- De ytre banker, 1971
- Veier og vandringer, 1972
- Når diktning blir forbrytelse, 1976
- Fjære, 1977
- Fra stalinisme til sosialdemokrati, 1979
- Krigene etter krigen, 1980
- Halvard Lange — portrett av en nordmann, 1981
- Det hendte meg, 1983
- Trygve Bratteli, 1984
- Bedre kan jeg ikke fare ..., 1987
- Sigrid Undset. Et liv, 1991

Awards
| Preceded by Jacob R. Kuhnle | Recipient of the Narvesen Prize; 1962 (shared with Odd Hagen) | Succeeded by Arne Hestenes |
