= Torborg Nedreaas =

Norwegian author

Torborg Nedreaas (13 November 1906 – 30 June 1987) was a Norwegian writer. She received the Norwegian Critics Prize for Literature, the Dobloug Prize, the Nordic Council's Literature Prize.

== Biography ==
She was born in Bergen, Norway. Until 1947 she lived at Leirvik in Hordaland. Then she relocated to Nesodden in Akershus. She trained as a music teacher.

She debuted with the collection of short stories Bak skapet står øksen in 1945. The majority of the stories centered on events and interactions during the Second World War. It was not war literature, but an examination of the occurrences and situations which the war created for people who were not directly involved in the war, but who nonetheless paid a high price because they lived during the Occupation of Norway by Nazi Germany.

She wrote a series of novels, novellas, plays and pieces for television. Many of her books were set in the environment and in settings from Leirvik, where she spent many summers in her childhood. Class differences and poverty are central themes that permeate her work. Her work was recognized with numerous prizes. She received prestigious Norwegian Critics Prize for Literature (Kritikerprisen) in 1950, the Dobloug Prize (Doblougprisen) in 1964 and in 1972 the Nordic Council's Literature Prize (Nordisk Råds litteraturpris).

== Bibliography ==
- Bak skapet står øksen – short stories (1945)
- Før det ringer tredje gang – short stories (1945)
- Av måneskinn gror det ingenting – (Available in translation: Nothing Grows by Moonlight) novel (1947)
- Trylleglasset – short stories(1950)
- De varme hendene – short stories (1952)
- Den siste polka – short stories (1953)
- Musikk fra en blå brønn – novel (1960)
- Ytringer i det blå – kåserier (1967)
- Ved neste nymåne – novel (1971)
- Det dumme hjertet – play (1978)
- Vintervår – essays (1982)
- Gjennom et prisme – collection of text (1983)
- Noveller – og noen essays – short stories, essays (1995)

== Prizes ==
- Kritikerprisen 1950 for Trylleglasset
- Dobloug Prize 1964
- Mads Wiel Nygaards Endowment 1966
- Det Norske Akademis Pris 1986
