= Bergljot Hobæk Haff =

Norwegian educator and novelist

- Born: 1 May 1925; Botne, Vestfold, Norway
- Died: 12 February 2016 (aged 90); Oslo, Norway
- Occupation: Novelist
- Writing career
- Period: 1956–2016
- Genre: Prose

Bergljot Hobæk Haff (1 May 1925 – 12 February 2016) was a Norwegian educator and novelist.

== Biography ==
Haff was born in Botne Municipality (now part of Holmestrand Municipality) in Vestfold county, Norway. Her parents were Lars Hobæk (1883–1938) and Martha Aarvold (1895–1987). Both of her parents were educators. She graduated from the Sandefjord Gymnasium in 1943. In 1947, she graduated from Oslo lærerhøgskole (now Oslo University College) with a degree in education. Upon completing her education, she moved to Denmark and taught school for 24 years before returning to Oslo in 1972.

She made her debut with the novel Raset in 1956. She has written both contemporary and historical novels. Her writing has been characterized by original narrative and often by poetical imagination. Her works have also featured both mythical and allegorical interpretation. Her novels have been translated into several languages including English, French, Dutch, Spanish, Italian, Swedish and Lithuanian.

== Personal life ==
She was married twice. In 1948, she married Jørgen Haff (1925–1977). Their marriage was dissolved in 1961. In 1964, she married Søren Christensen. Their marriage was dissolved in 1972. Her daughter Marianne Hobæk Haff is a professor of French linguistics at the University of Oslo.

== Awards ==
Haff was awarded the Norwegian Critics Prize for Literature in 1962 for Bålet. She received the Dobloug Prize (Doblougprisen) in 1985, the Norwegian Academy Prize in 1988 and the Aschehoug Prize (Aschehougprisen) in 1989. She also was awarded the Brage Prize (Brageprisen) in 1996 for Skammen, the Norwegian Critics Prize for Literature 1996, for Skammen and the Riksmål Society Literature Prize in 1996. She was nominated twice for the Nordic Council's Literature Prize, once for Den guddommelige tragedie and again for Renhetens pris.

She was awarded the Amalie Skram Prize in 1995.

== Bibliography ==
- Raset – novel – published in English as “The Landslide” (1956)
- Liv – novel (1958)
- Du finner ham aldri – novel (1960)
- Bålet – novel – published in English as “The Bonfire” (1962)
- Skjøgens bok – novel (1965)
- Den sorte kappe – novel (1969)
- Sønnen – novel (1971)
- Heksen – novel (1974)
- Gudsmoren. En menneskelig komedie – novel (1977)
- Jeg, Bakunin – novel (1983)
- Den guddommelige tragedie – novel (1989)
- Renhetens pris – novel (1992)
- Skammen – novel – published in English as “Shame” (1996)
- Sigbrits bålferd – novel (1999)
- Den evige jøde – novel (2002)
- Attentatet – novel (2004)
