= 1968 in Norway =

- Centuries: 18th; 19th; 20th; 21st
- Decades: 1940s; 1950s; 1960s; 1970s; 1980s
- See also: List of years in Norway

Events in the year 1968 in Norway.

== Incumbents ==
- Monarch – Olav V.
- Prime Minister – Per Borten (Centre Party)

== Events ==
- 19 February – Avalanches occur in Bondalen which kill four people.
- 19 March – The Palace announces that Crown Prince Harald has engaged to Sonja Haraldsen.
- 29 August – Crown Prince Harald married Sonja Haraldsen in the Oslo Cathedral.
- 13 September – Norwegian whaling in the Southern Hemisphere ceases after the last whaling company officially announces it would not send any more whaling expeditions.
- 9 October – the first commercial discovery of petroleum deposit on the Norwegian continental shelf was confirmed.
- The Norwegian Sami Association was founded

=== Literature ===
- The Norwegian Writers' Center (Norsk forfattersentrum) is established.
- Finn Alnæs, novelist, is awarded the Norwegian Booksellers' Prize and the Norwegian Critics Prize for Literature for the novel Gemini.
- Ebba Haslund, novelist, is awarded the Riksmål Society Literature Prize for Syndebukkens krets.

== Notable births ==
=== January to March ===
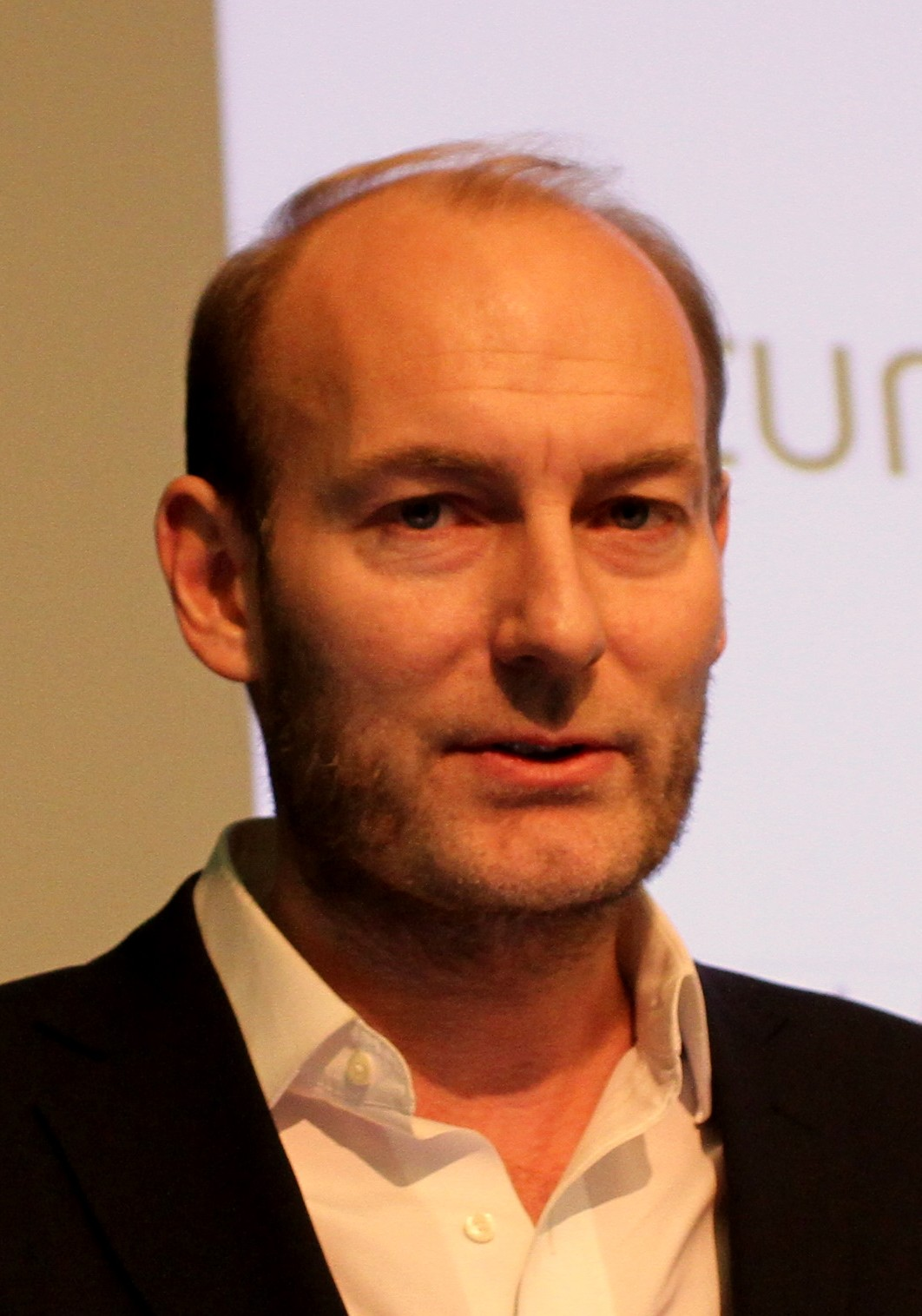
Knut Olav Åmås

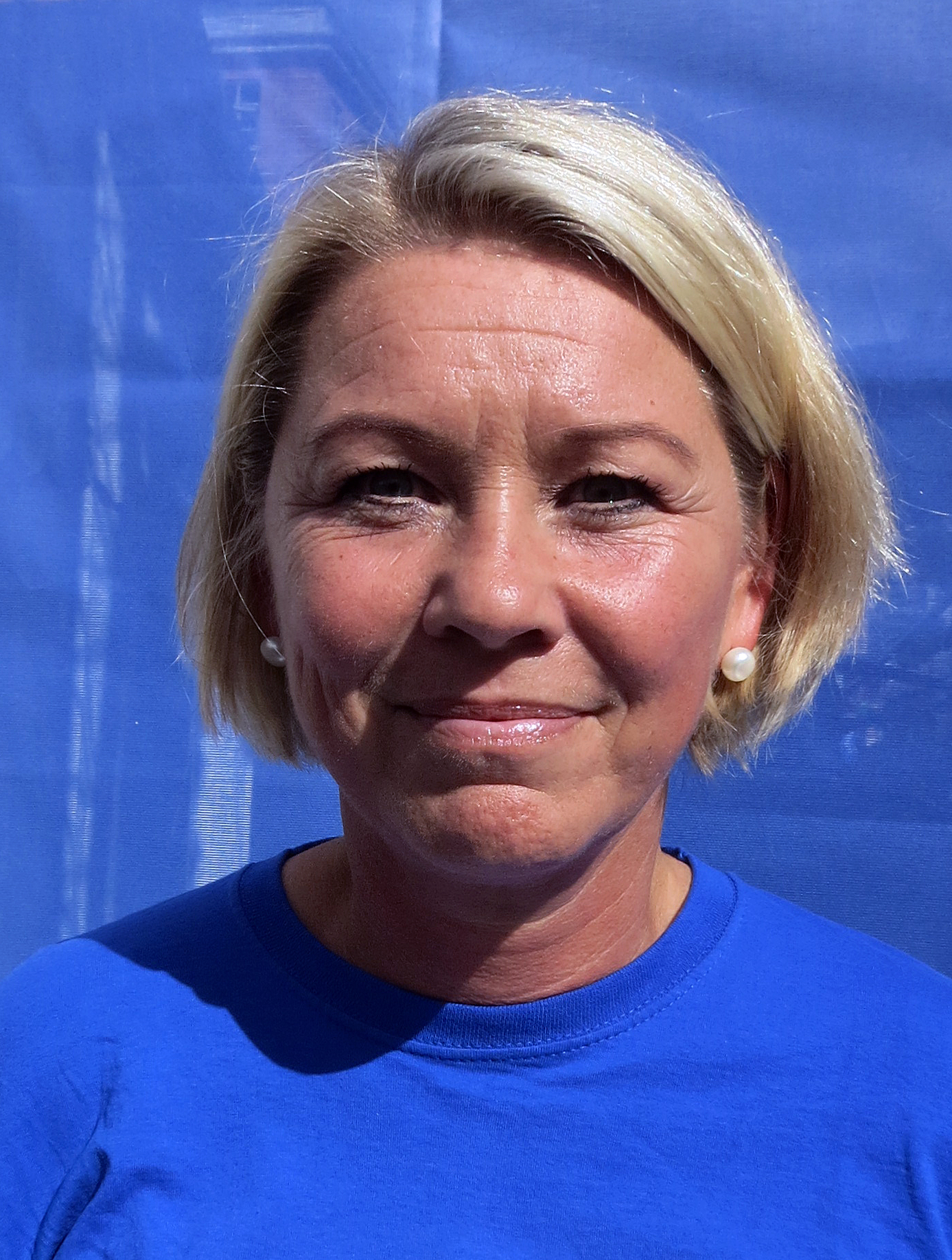
Monica Mæland

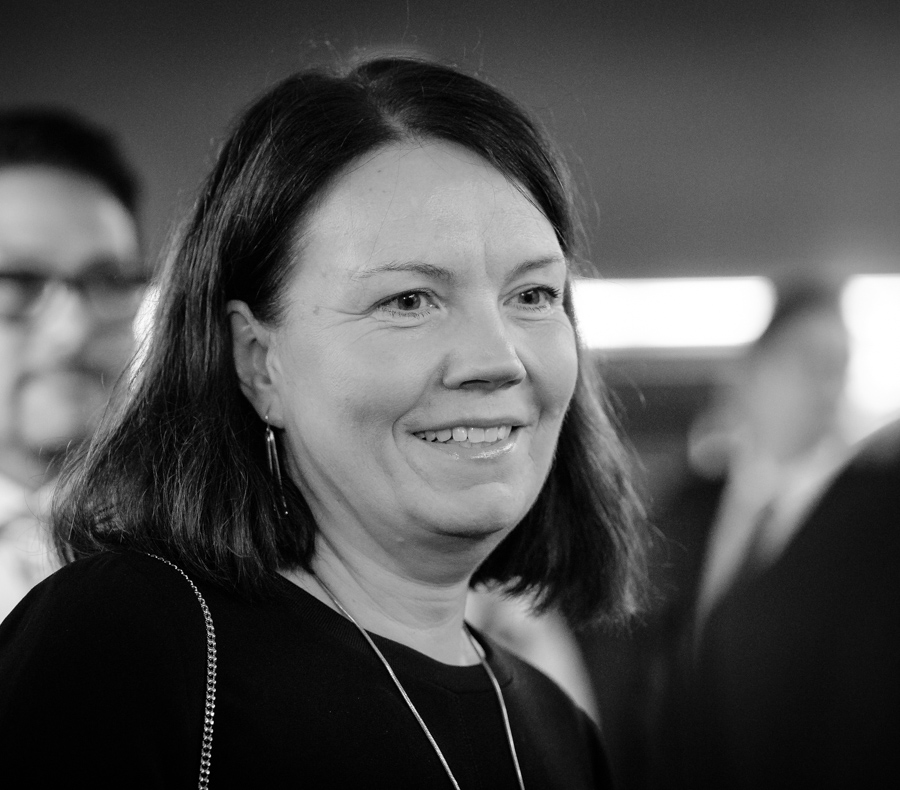
Anne Nafstad Lyftingsmo

- 15 January – Grete Wold, politician.
- 16 January – Mikkel Gaup, actor.
- 19 January – Knut Olav Åmås, writer, philosopher, editor, politician.
- 22 January – Beate Kristiansen, sailor.
- 28 January – Tore Torvbråten, curler.
- 31 January – May-Helen Molvær Grimstad, politician
- 31 January – Tom Tvedt, politician and sports executive.
- 2 February – Espen Bredesen, ski jumper.
- 6 February – Arne Lygre, writer.
- 6 February – Monica Mæland, politician.
- 12 February – Svein Enersen, footballer.
- 18 February – Frank Edvard Sve, politician.
- 22 February – Trine Wiggen, actress.
- 26 February – Morgan Engebretsen Langfeldt, politician.
- 27 February – Ståle Solbakken, footballer.
- 1 March – Lars Mytting, writer.
- 14 March – Yngve Hallén, sports executive.
- 19 March – Julie Christiansen, politician
- 22 March – Euronymous, black metal guitarist (died 1993).
- 24 March – Anne Nafstad Lyftingsmo, civil servant.
- 25 March – Jon Hustad, journalist, author (died 2023).
- 30 March – Gunstein Bakke, writer.
- 30 March – Jon Øivind Ness, composer.

=== April to June ===
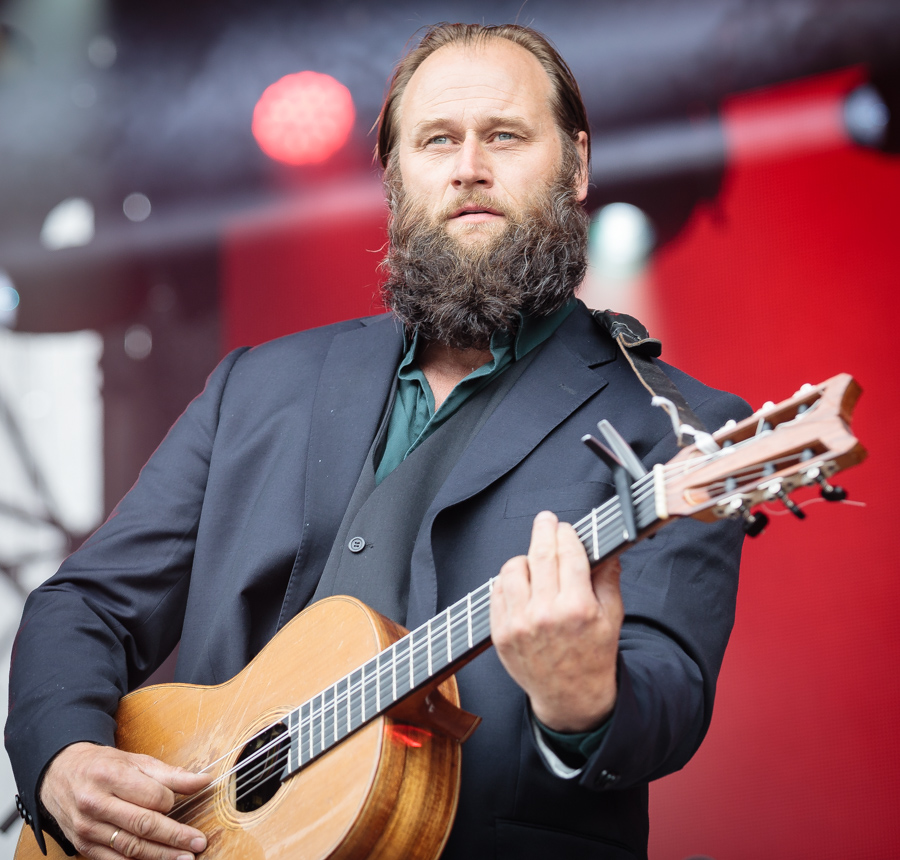
Stein Torleif Bjella

- 1 April – Tone Rasmussen, sprint canoer.
- 7 April – Stein Torleif Bjella, singer and songwriter.
- 9 April – André Støylen, politician.
- 1 May – Bjørn Sortland, writer.
- 20 May – Vibeke Fürst Haugen, media executive.
- 18 June – Kjell Ivar Larsen, politician.
- 27 June – Rikke Lind, politician.

=== July to September ===
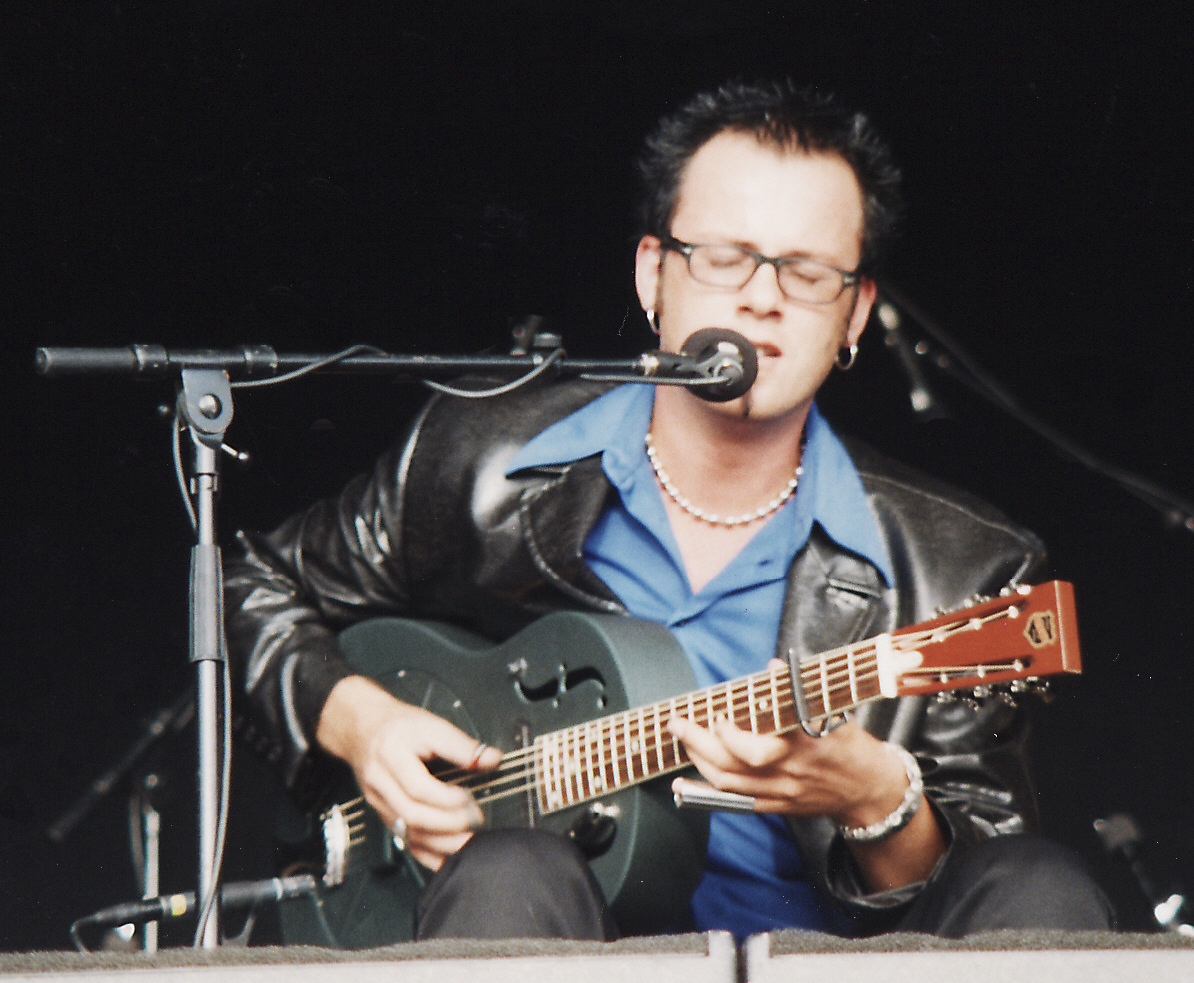
Bjørn Berge

- 2 July – Fridtjov Såheim, actor.
- 4 July – Espen Stokkeland, sailor.
- 5 July – Anthon Grimsmo, curler.
- 29 July – Ingrid Margrethe Gjerde, military officer.
- 5 August – Frode Jacobsen, politician.
- 8 August – Else Ragni Yttredal, speed skater.
- 13 August – Ketil Kjenseth, politician.
- 15 August – Frode Øverli, comic strip cartoonist.
- 21 August – Hanne Tømta, theatre instructor and theatre director.
- 25 August – Rune Erland, handball player.
- 28 August – Runar Sjåstad, politician.
- 30 August – Ingunn Beate Øyen, actress.
- 1 September – Annette Skotvoll, handball goalkeeper.
- 23 September – Bjørn Berge, guitarist, blues artist.
- 24 September – Beate Heieren Hundhammer, politician
- 26 September – Kjetil Bragli Alstadheim, journalist.

=== October to December ===
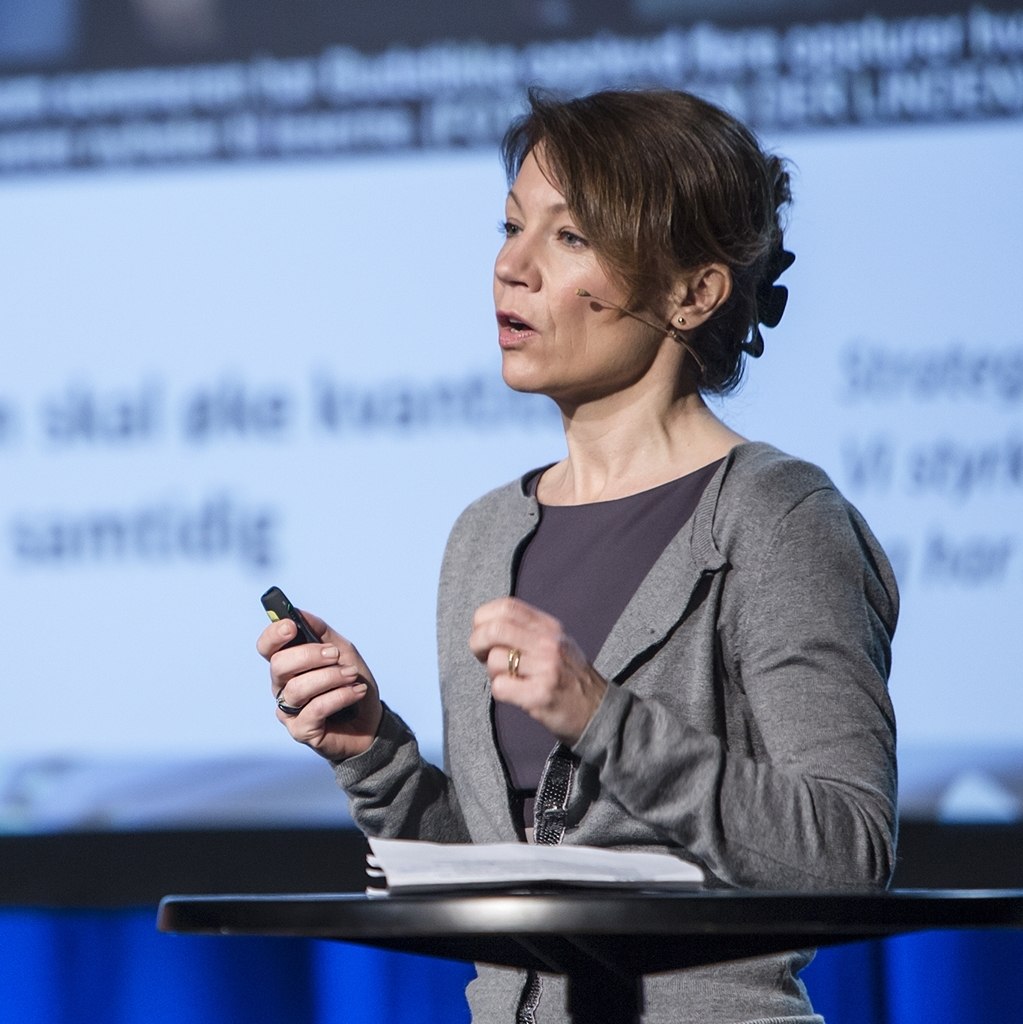
Kjersti Sortland

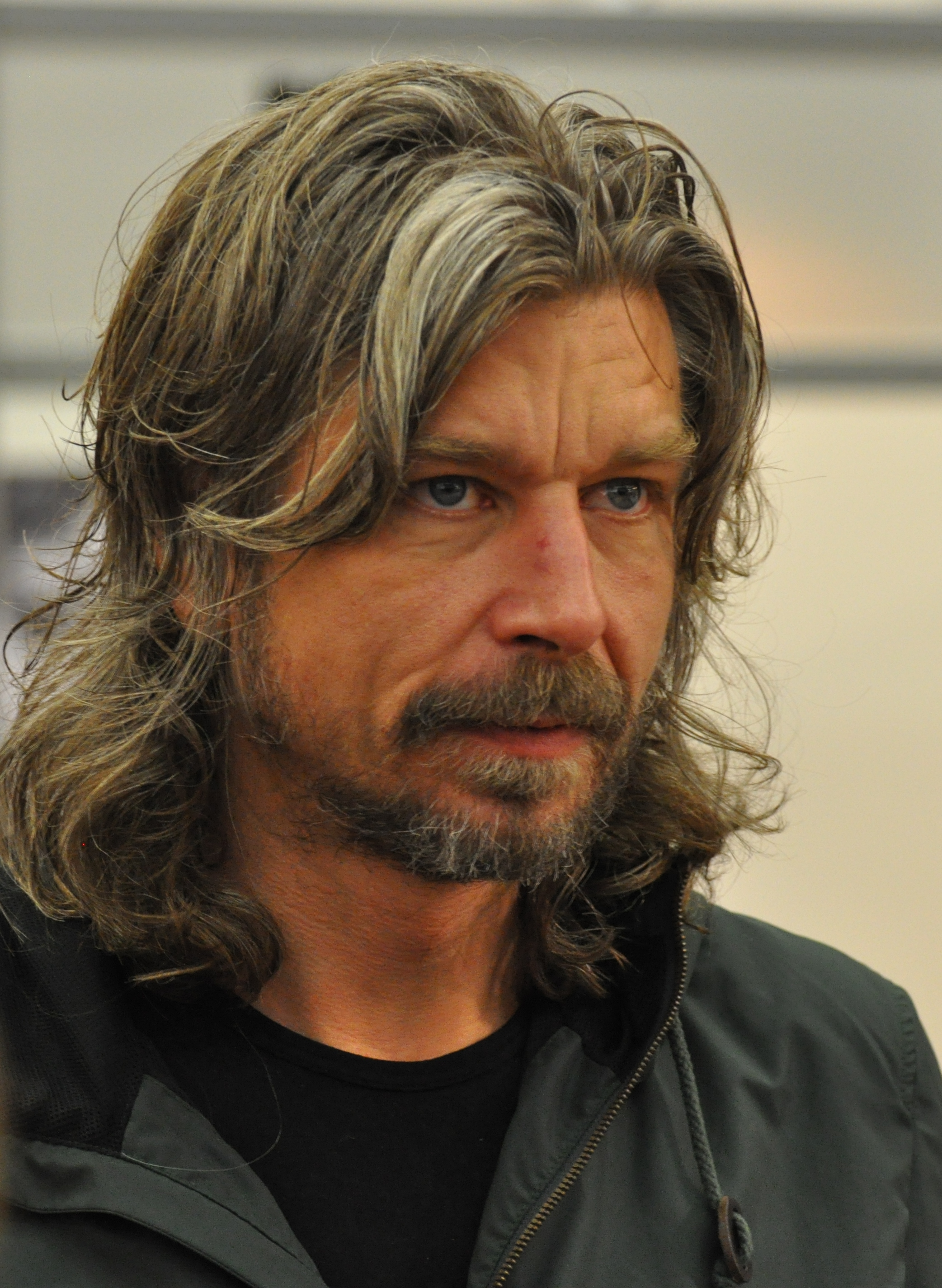
Karl Ove Knausgård

- 15 October – Grethe Wolan, curler.
- 16 October – Vibeke Johnsen, handball player.
- 26 October – Jon Åge Tyldum, biathlete.
- 29 October – Aili Keskitalo, Sami politician.
- 29 October – Johann Olav Koss, speed skater.
- 1 November – Astrid Danielsen, cyclist.
- 6 November – Kjetil Rekdal, footballer.
- 8 November – Oddmund Løkensgard Hoel, politician.
- 14 November – Tone Berge Hansen, politician.
- 21 November – Per Morten Haugen, footballer.
- 23 November – Kjersti Sortland, newspaper editor.
- 25 November – Tor André Johnsen, politician.
- 27 November – Ellen Scheel Aalbu, footballer.
- 6 December – Karl Ove Knausgård, author
- 12 December – Anita Valen, cyclist.

=== Full date missing ===
- Audun Rikardsen, photographer.
- Sigurd Slåttebrekk, pianist.
- Mari Velsand, media executive.

== Notable deaths ==
=== January to March ===
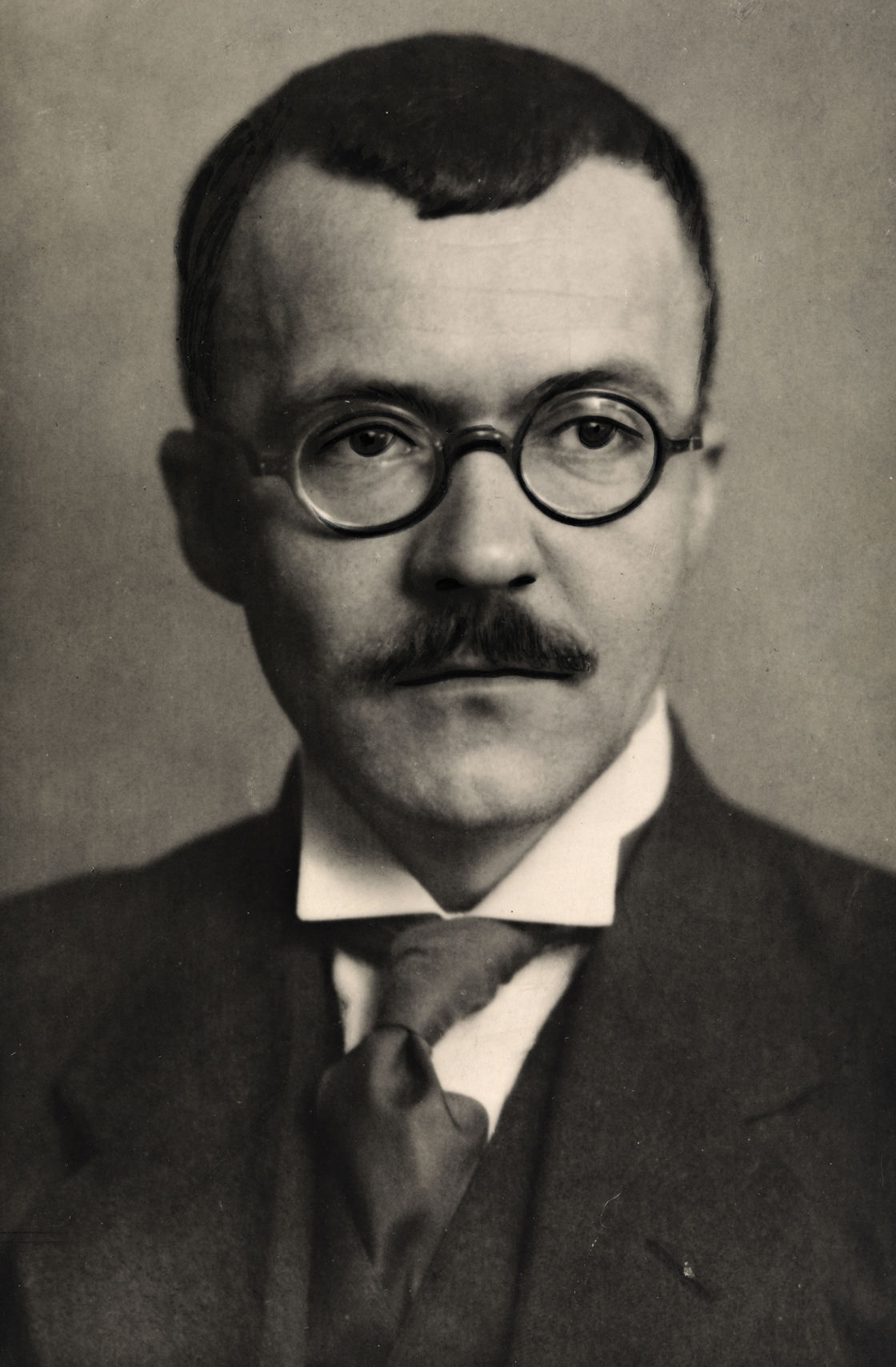
Arnulf Øverland

- 12 January – John Aae, politician (born 1890)
- 18 January – Trygve Knudsen, philologist, linguist and lexicographer (born 1897).
- 21 January – Jacob Gundersen, freestyle wrestler and Olympic silver medallist (born 1875).
- 11 February
  - Jørgen Wilhelm Rudolph, businessperson (born 1881)
  - Herman Willoch, painter (born 1892).
- 29 February – Tore Ørjasæter, poet (born 1886).
- 2 March – Odd Hølaas, journalist and writer (born 1898).
- 12 March – Einar Kristian Haugen, politician (born 1905)
- 19 March – Aagot Didriksen, actress (born 1874).
- 25 March – Arnulf Øverland, author (born 1889).
- 31 March – Christen Wiese, sailor and Olympic gold medallist (born 1876)

=== April to June ===
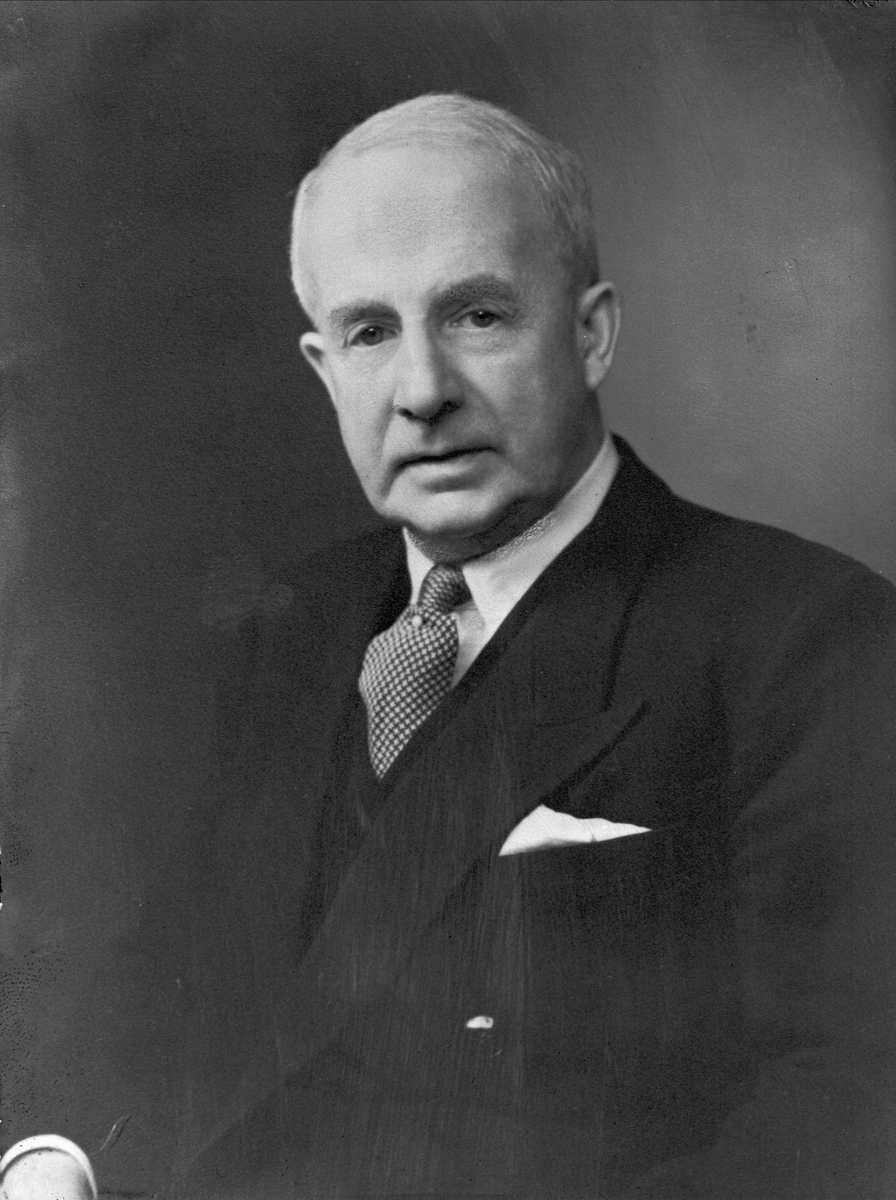
Paal Berg

- 7 April – Carl Bugge, geologist (born 1881).
- 15 April – Martin Stenersen, sport shooter (born 1879)
- 25 April – Gunnar Andersen, international soccer player and ski jumper (born 1890)
- 27 April – Anton Olsen, rifle shooter and Olympic bronze medallist (born 1897)
- 29 April – Aasa Helgesen, midwife and politician (born 1877).
- 11 May – Johan Andersen, politician (born 1902)
- 23 May – Georg Braathe, long-distance runner (born 1903)
- 24 May – Paal Olav Berg, politician and Minister (born 1873)
- 25 May – Kasper Idland, resistance member (born 1918)
- 1 June – Harald Eriksen, gymnast and Olympic gold medallist (born 1888)
- 3 June – John Bjørnstad, rowing coxswain (born 1888).
- 29 June – Thorry Kiær, industrialist (born 1888).

=== July to September ===
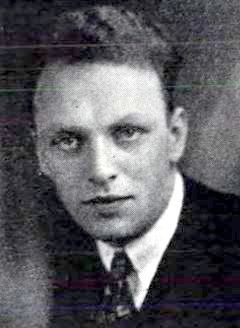
Øystein Ore

- 6 July – Johan Sæterhaug, boxer (born 1893)
- 16 July – Sigurd Pedersen, politician (born 1893)
- 25 July – Hallvard Sandnes, writer (born 1893).
- 6 August – Tore Foss, singer, actor and theatre director (born 1901).
- 13 August – Øystein Ore, mathematician (born 1899)
- 16 August – Paul Ingebretsen, politician (born 1904)
- 29 August – Arne Korsmo, architect (born 1900)
- 4 September – Engebret Skogen, rifle shooter and Olympic bronze medallist (born 1887)
- 24 September – Kjell Tellander, politician (born 1899)

=== October to December ===
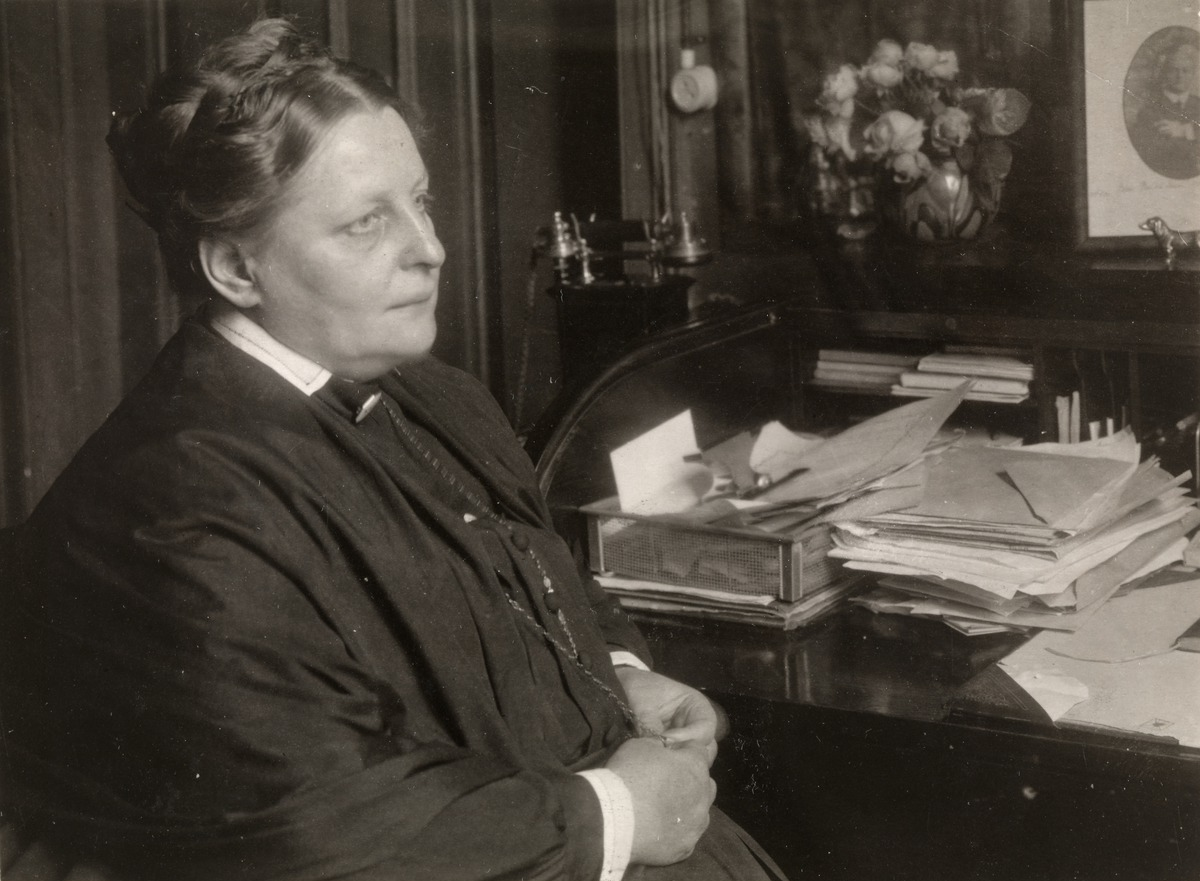
Bergljot Larsson

- 3 October – Jens Martin Arctander Jenssen, politician (born 1885)
- 2 December – Arne Damm, publisher (born 1894).
- 15 December – Håkon Bryhn, sailor and Olympic gold medallist (born 1901)
- 20 December – Anders Endreson Skrondal, politician (born 1891)
- 29 December – Bergljot Larsson, nurse and organizational leader (born 1883).
- 30 December – Trygve Lie, politician, the first elected United Nations Secretary-General (born 1896)
