= Enersen =

Enersen is a surname. Notable people with the surname include:

- Adele Enersen, American illustrator
- Jean Enersen (born 1944), American journalist
- Ole Daniel Enersen (born 1943), Norwegian climber, photographer, journalist, and medical historian
- Ole Enersen (born 2002), Norwegian footballer
- Svein Enersen (born 1968), Norwegian newspaper editor and football player
