= Folkestad (surname) =

Folkestad is a surname. Notable people with the surname include:

- Anders Folkestad (born 1949), Norwegian schoolteacher and trade unionist
- Anker Folkestad (1914–1989), Norwegian civil servant
- Aud Folkestad (born 1953), Norwegian politician
- Bernhard Folkestad (1879–1933), Norwegian painter and essayist
- Göran Folkestad (born 1952), Swedish songwriter and singer
- Halvor Olsen Folkestad (1807–1889), Norwegian Lutheran bishop
- Olav Georg Folkestad (1902–1976), Norwegian engineer
