= Caryn Oyo Dasah =

Cameronian Feminist, activist, Gender equity advocate

- Born: 1992 (age 33–34); Econa
- Citizenship: Cameroon
- Occupation: Activist
- Known for: Gender equity advocate

Caryn Oyo Dasah is a Cameroonian feminist, social justice activist, and advocate for gender equality. She is the founder of Hope Advocates Africa, an organization dedicated to promoting women's empowerment, peacebuilding, and the sexual, reproductive, and human rights of women and girls.

== Early life and education ==
Dasah was born in Econa in Cameroon Southwest Region in 1992. She holds a master's degree in peace, conflict, and international relations. In 2023, she was chosen as one of 20 young feminist activists globally to join the Sister-to-Sister Mentorship Program, a collaborative initiative by the Nobel Women's Initiative and the Coady International Institute.

== Advocacy ==
In 2019, Dasah and several fellow Cameroonian advocates attended a conflict resolution and mediation residency hosted by the pan-African peace movement, Africans Rising. This made her and the participants to establish the Cameroon Women's Peace Movement.Dasah spearheaded a delegation from the movement to participate in pre-consultation talks for the government-sponsored National Dialogue peace process.

She was a member of the Beijing+25 Youth Task Force, in 2020 she was elected general coordinator of the Cameroon women's peace movement.

In 2022, She led an initiative through her organization, Hope Advocates Africa, to distribute birthing kits to vulnerable pregnant women's and girls at the Buea Regional Hospital Annex in the Southwest region. Backed by funding from NAMATI and the Global Fund for Human Rights.

She serves as an ambassador for the UN Women's Generation Equality Task Force. In this role, she attended the "I am Generation Equality" forums in both New York and Paris, amplifying the voices of the women she represents. she also acts as the general coordinator for the Cameroon Women's Peace Movement.Her extensive advocacy earned her recognition in 2023 when she was selected as one of ten female peacebuilders to receive a grant from the “Women Waging Peace” network.
