= Federation of Norwegian Professional Associations =

Norwegian trade union federation

Akademikerne
- Akademikerne
- Founded: October 1997
- Headquarters: Oslo, Norway
- Location: Norway
- Members: 231,062
- Key people: Lise Lyngsnes Randeberg (president)
- Website: www.akademikerne.no

The Federation of Norwegian Professional Associations (Norwegian: Akademikerne) is a national trade union center in Norway. It was formed in October, 1997 as a break-away union from the Academic and Professional Unions (AF).

Akademikerne has a membership of 231,062.

== Affiliates ==
The following unions were affiliated to the federation as of 2021:

Union	Membership (2021)
Architects' Association	5,277
Econa	25,468
National Association of War School Educated Officers	1,606
Naturviterne	6,855
Norwegian Association of Lawyers	20,651
Norwegian Dental Association	6,954
Norwegian Lecturers' Association	8,260
Norwegian Medical Association	37,357
Norwegian Psychological Association	10,214
Norwegian Veterinary Association	3,503
Social Scientists	15,311
Socio-economists	2,720
Tekna	86,868

== Cooperating Unions ==
Several unions cooperate with Akademikerne when negotiating on a state or municipal level:

- Norwegian Society of Engineers and Technologists
- The Norwegian Association of Pharmacists
- Den Norske Jordmorforening
