= Folkestad =

Folkestad may refer to:

- Folkestad (surname)
- Folkestad, Bø
- Folkestad Chapel
