= Dagsland =

Dagsland is a Norwegian surname. Notable people with the surname include:

- Helga Dagsland (1910–2003), Norwegian nurse and organizational leader
- Sigvart Dagsland (born 1963), Norwegian singer, pianist, and composer
- Sturle Dagsland, Norwegian singer
