= Lise Lyngsnes Randeberg =

Norwegian engineer and trade unionist

Lise Lyngsnes Randeberg (born 1974) is a Norwegian engineer and trade unionist. She is a professor at the Norwegian University of Science and Technology, and has been president of both Tekna and the Federation of Norwegian Professional Associations.

== Career ==
She was born and grew up in Namsos Municipality. Her interest in sciences was spurred, and she enrolled in the Norwegian Institute of Technology in Trondheim. While studying she got married and was pregnant twice, and after taking a siv.ing. degree she continued as a doctoral candidate. The Norwegian Institute of Technology changed its name to the Norwegian University of Science and Technology (NTNU). Since 2011 she has been a professor of biomedical optics and photonics at that institution.

Much of her research concerned itself with light sensing of biological material. She worked with technology and methods of characterizing jaundice and bruises in skin, among others.

Randeberg was also a board member of the Norwegian University of Science and Technology from 2007 to 2009. In 2013 she became president of the trade union for engineers, Tekna. From 2016 she was deputy leader of the professionals' trade union center Federation of Norwegian Professional Associations, became acting leader in December 2021 and leader in 2022.

She is also a board member of the Norwegian Museum of Science and Technology.
