= Academic and Professional Unions =

Norwegian national trade union centre

The Academic and Professional Unions (Norwegian: Akademikernes Fellesorganisasjon, AF) was a national trade union centre in Norway, representing workers with a degree or equivalent qualification.

The federation was established in 1975, when the Federation of Higher Civil Servants merged with the Norwegian Association of Academics. By 1996, it had 27 affiliates, with a total of 246,961 members. However, that year, the Norwegian Medical Association disaffiliated, followed in 1997 by the Norwegian Civil Engineers' Association and several smaller unions, many of which formed the rival Federation of Norwegian Professional Associations.

The remainder of the federation tried to negotiate a merger with the Confederation of Vocational Unions, but could not agree terms. Instead, in 2001, it dissolved, with most of its remaining affiliates forming the new Confederation of Unions for Professionals.

== Affiliates ==
In 1983, the following unions were affiliated:

Union	Abbreviation	Founded	Membership (1983)
Architects' Association	AFAG	1982	1,354
Broadcasting Association		1963	521
National Association of Academy-Educated Officers		1909	771
Norwegian Agricultural Academics' Union	NLF	1970	3,722
Norwegian Bar Association		1908	2,916
Norwegian Business Economists' Union	NSF	1939	5,096
Norwegian Church Priests' Union		1900	1,683
Norwegian Civil Engineers' Association	NIF	1874	17,908
Norwegian College Lecturers		1899	960
Norwegian Corporate Economists' Union	NBF		635
Norwegian Dental Association		1884	4,277
Norwegian Society of Engineers and Technologists	NITO	1936	26,010
Norwegian Folk High School Association		1905	460
Norwegian Lawyers' Union	NJ	1966	4,714
Norwegian Pharmaceutical Union		1958	1,617
Norwegian Physiotherapists' Union		1895	4,536
Norwegian Professional Teachers' Association	NF	1974	6,434
Norwegian Social Economists' Union		1908	558
Norwegian Teachers' Union	NUFO	1892	15,960
Norwegian Trade Teachers' Association		1946	1,618
Norwegian Veterinary Association		1888	1,232
Physiochemists' Union		1962	2,205
Psychologists' Association		1934	1,432
Researchers' Union		1955	3,681
