= Levi Henriksen =

Norwegian novelist, short story writer and singer-songwriter

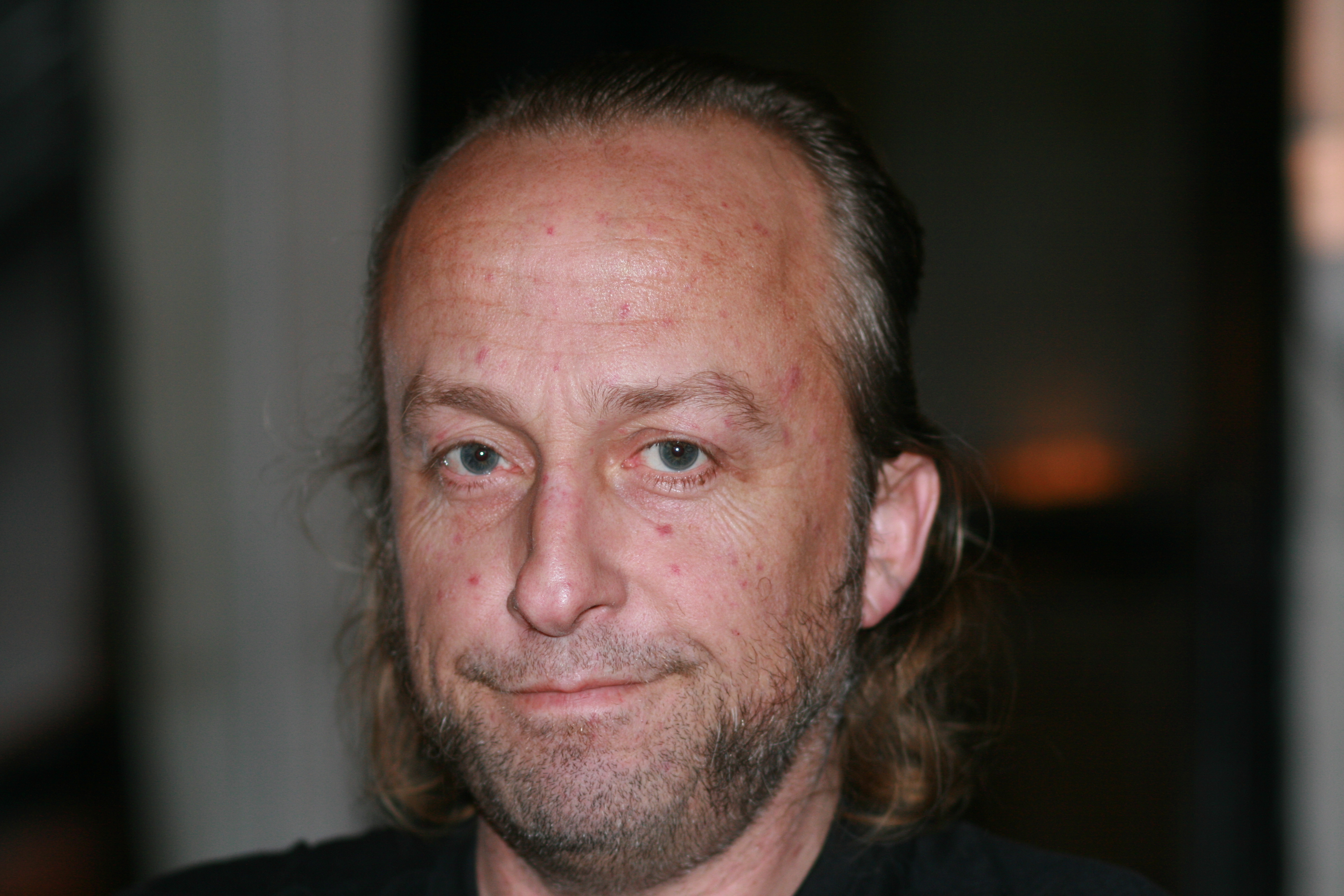
- Henriksen in November 2007
- Born: 15 May 1964 (age 62); Kongsvinger, Norway
- Occupations: Novelist, short story writer, singer-songwriter
- Writing career
- Notable work: Snø vil falle over snø som falt

Levi Henriksen (born 15 May 1964) is a Norwegian novelist, short story writer and singer-songwriter.

== Career ==
When his first short story collection Feber was published in 2002, Henriksen immediately captured the public's imagination with his unique and charismatic voice. This was followed in 2003 by Ned, Ned, Ned, a further selection of short stories. His break-through came in 2004 with his novel Snø vil falle over snø som har falt. This soon became a best seller and was awarded the Norwegian Booksellers' Prize.

Other books are the novels Babylon Badlands (2006), Like østenfor regnet (2008), Dagen skal komme med blå vind (2011) and Harp Song (2014), the easy readers Den aller siste mohikaner (2006) and Trekkspilltvillingene (2007), the short story collections Bare mjuke pakker under treet (2005) and Alt det som lå meg på hjertet (2009), as well as the poetry collection Kjære deg, min kjære (2010) and the non-fiction book Mannen fra Montana (2009).

Henriksen's trademark is a capacity for combining a strong, at times aggressive, masculine voice with vulnerability. His works are mainly set in a tough, unsentimental, rural environment, which sits uncomfortably on the edges of contemporary urban life; a place where old and new values clash, and where men struggle with contemporary, urban demands on their masculinity.

Henriksen was a journalist for many years on a local newspaper in Kongsvinger, a small town which appears in much of his work, before becoming a full-time author. He also plays the guitar and sings in his own band, Levi Henriksen & Babylon Badlands, writing song lyrics and composing.

In 2010, the prize-winning director, Bent Hamer, released a feature film, Hjem til jul, based on Bare mjuke pakker under treet to critical acclaim and full houses.

Levi Henriksen's works have been translated into eleven languages.

== Discography ==
=== Albums ===
- Greetings from Stuckville (1989), with Heart of Mary
- Herfra til Rockaway Beach (2005), with Thomas Mårud
- Bang Bang rett ned (2007), with Thomas Mårud
- Det er her vi kommer fra (2010), with Bra landsens folk
- Langt sakte tog (2012), with Bra landsens folk
- Det beste bandet i himmelen (2016), with Babylon Badlands
- Verden av i går (2017), with Babylon Badlands
- De utålmodige av hjertet (2019), with Babylon Badlands
- Down below is the town I know (2022), with Heart of Mary

=== Singles ===
- Possibilities/Bil uten lys (1983), with Blundertown
- Kom tilbake til oss Alf Prøysen (2007), with Thomas Mårud, Åge Aleksandersen, and Frelsesarmeens blåsere
- Bensinstasjonsroser (2007), with Thomas Mårud
- Det er her vi kommer fra (2010), with Bra landsens folk
- Hjertet er en muskel (2016), with Babylon Badlands
- Aldri var november så lys (2016), with Babylon Badlands
- Pilegrim Måne (2016), with Babylon Badlands
- Verden av i går (2017), with Babylon Badlands
- Rembrandt brukte bare fem farger (2018), with Babylon Badlands

== Awards ==
- Norwegian Booksellers' Prize 2004.
- Vidar Sandbeck cultural award 2018.
