= Kristian Kristiansen (writer) =

Norwegian writer (1909–1980)

Kristian Kristiansen (16 November 1909 – 14 July 1980) was a Norwegian novelist, playwright, writer of short stories, and children's writer.

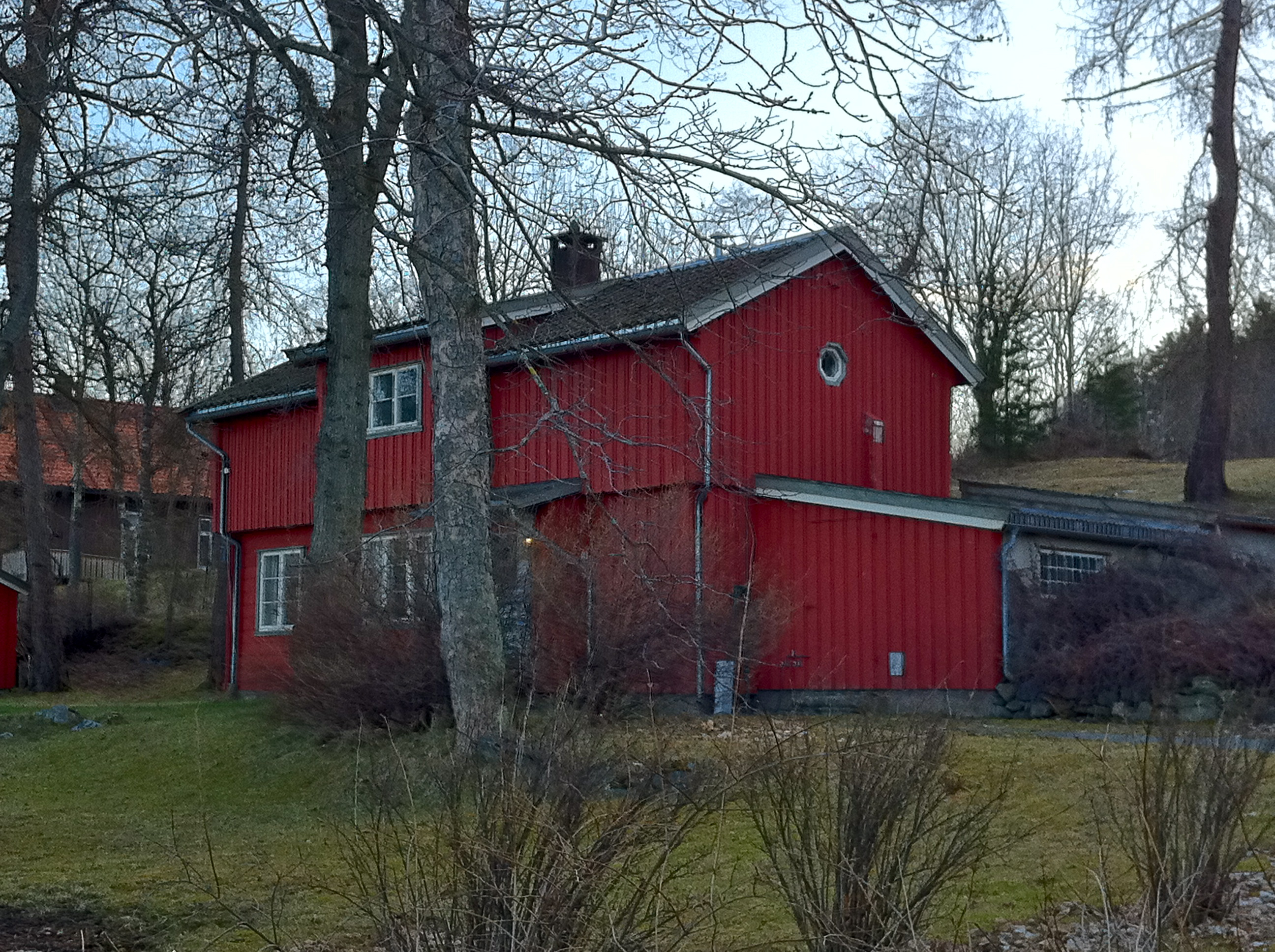
Adrianstua at Trondheimsfjord

== Biography ==
He was born at Tromsø in Troms, Norway. He was the son of carpenter Ingbert Kristiansen (1881–1968) and his wife Ingeborg Haugen (1886–1976). The family moved to Trøndelag when Kristian was nine years old. After middle school he held several different jobs. Starting in 1936, he published a large number of short stories in the magazine Arbeidermagasinet. In the late 1930s he published two short plays, Det dages (1937) and Medaljen (1938), and the children's book Eggtjuver i fugleberget (1938). His first novel, Vi bærer et bilde, came in 1939. His youth's book Jeg er ingen spion! from 1940 is one of the very few books published in Norway throughout the Second World War. It is told from the unoccupied parts of the country during the Norwegian Campaign in 1940.

After the liberation of Norway, Kristansen lived for a while in Sweden. In 1950 he moved to Trondheim, where he lived for the rest of his life. His novels published after 1950 were historical novels situated in Trondheim. He wrote a series of historical novels based partly on actual events from the city's history. The novel Klokken på Kalvskinnet (1966) is about the sufferings of a labour prisoner from the early 19th century.

The trilogy Adrian posepilt (1950), Vårherres blindebukk (1952) and I den sorte gryte (1954) is regarded as Kristiansen's main work. The story about a boy growing up in an orphanage in the late 17th century made Kristiansen known throughout the country. Kristiansen's most notable work appeared in a play by dramatist Petter S. Rosenlund with stylized dance by Martha Standal and directed by Kjersti Haugen. It has been featured on the stage of the Trøndelag Teater.

Kristiansen was awarded the Mads Wiel Nygaards Endowment in 1955. He received the Norwegian Booksellers' Prize in 1961 and in 1967 (jointly with Tarjei Vesaas).

== Personal life ==
During the occupation of Norway by Nazi Germany, Kristiansen became involved in resistance work. In 1942 he had to flee to Sweden. There he met the physician Ellen Hedlund (1915–1986); their subsequent marriage lasted from 1943 until 1955. In 1959 he married architect Turid Ellefsen (1918–2000).

== Adrianstua ==
Adrianstua at Trondheimsfjord was the home Trondheim of Kristian Kristiansen. His former residence is now owned by Trondheim municipality and under the management of Trøndersk Forfattarlag. It is rented to local authors for five-year periods. The house has been inhabited by the author Tale Næss (1997–2002), novelist Ingrid Storholmen (2002–2007), poet Arild Vange (2008–2013), and from 2013 by author Mathias R. Samuelsen.

== Selected works ==
- Det dages – (1937)
- Medaljen – (1938)
- Eggtjuver i fugleberget – (1938)
- Vi bærer et bilde – (1939)
- Jeg er ingen spion – (1940))
- Hvem skal havren binde – (1940)
- Over de høye fjelle – (1941)
- Men än står Dovre – (1943)
- Fredens øy – (1945)
- Brev til Stefan – (1947)
- Adrian Posepilt – (1950)
- Vårherres blindebukk – (1952)
- I den sorte gryte – (1954)
- Jesper nattmann – (1957)
- Jomfru Lide – (1960)
- Heia nordinger! (1962)
- Klokken på Kalvskinnet – (1966)
