= Jan-Erik Fjell =

Norwegian novelist (born 1982)

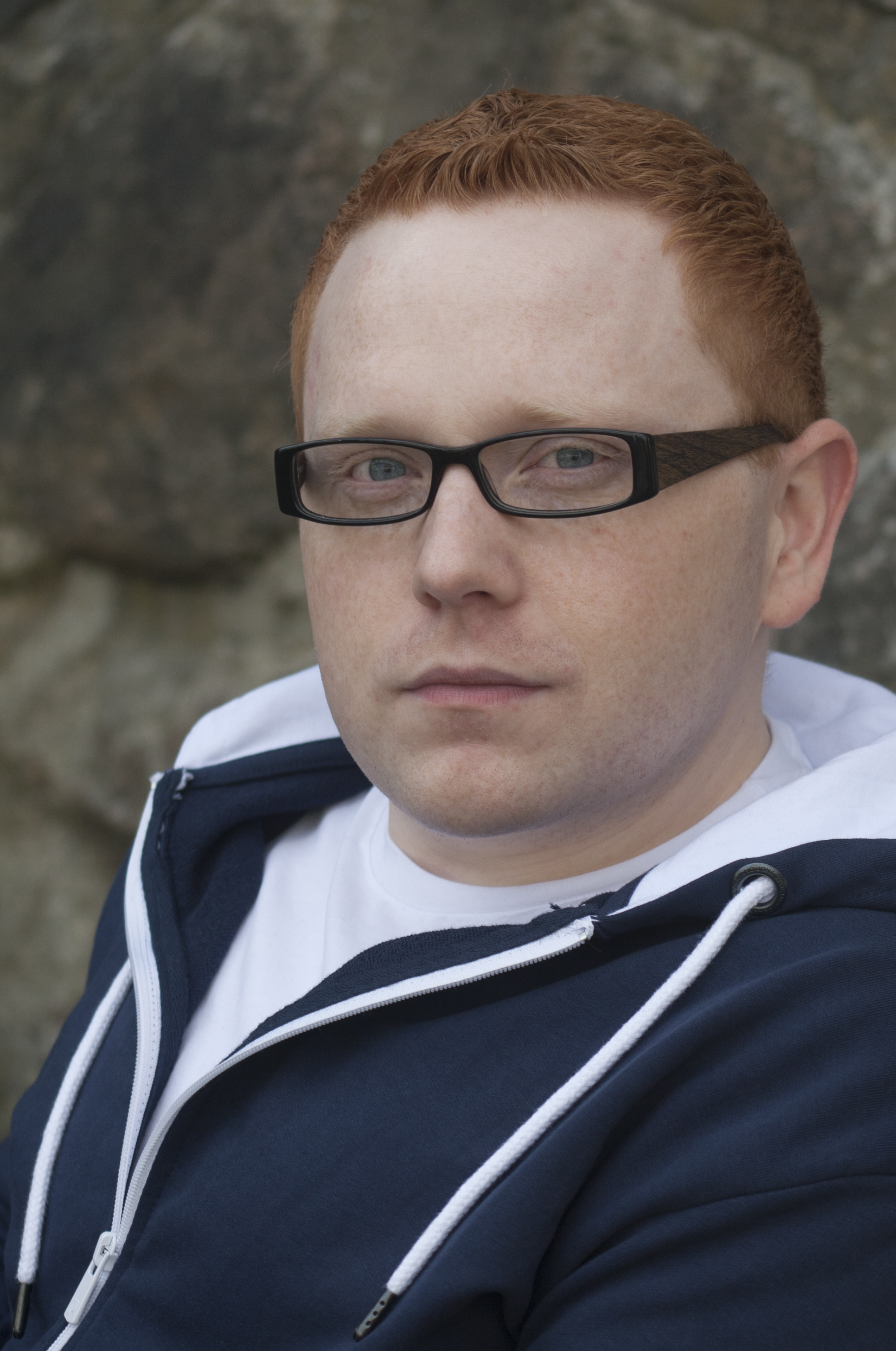
- Born: 20 October 1982 (age 43); Fredrikstad, Norway
- Occupation: Novelist
- Awards: Norwegian Booksellers' Prize (2010)

Jan-Erik Fjell (born 20 October 1982), is a Norwegian novelist and poker player. He is known for a series of crime novels with Kripos investigator Anton Brekke.

== Biography ==
Fjell was born in Fredrikstad on 20 October 1982. Born with spina bifida, he became dependant on a wheelchair.

He made his literary debut with the novel Pus in 2009. His crime novel Tysteren, with "Kripos investigator Anton Brekke" as the detective, was awarded the Norwegian Booksellers' Prize for 2010. Further crime novels are Skyggerom (2012), Hevneren (2013), Rovdyret (2014) and Lykkejegeren (2016).

Later crime novels with detective Anton Brekke, eventually no longer with Kripos, are Gjemsel (2019), Gråsonen (2020), Ringmannen (2021), Cassandra-saken (2022), and Nattravnen (2023).

The novel Skriket (2024) is written in collaboration with Jørn Lier Horst, and is planned to be the first in a series with crime podcaster Markus Heger.
