= Confederation of Unions for Professionals =

Trade union confederation for white collar workers in Norway

Unio
- Confederation of Unions for Professionals
- Utdanningsgruppenes Hovedorganisasjon
- Predecessor: Academic and Professional Unions
- Founded: December 2001
- Headquarters: Oslo, Norway
- Members: 375,181 (2019)
- Key people: Anders Folkestad
- Website: www.unio.no

The Confederation of Unions for Professionals (Norwegian: Utdanningsgruppenes Hovedorganisasjon; Unio) is a national trade union centre in Norway.

The federation was formed in 2001 by unions, most of which were formerly part of the Academic and Professional Unions. It has 13 affiliated unions and is politically neutral.

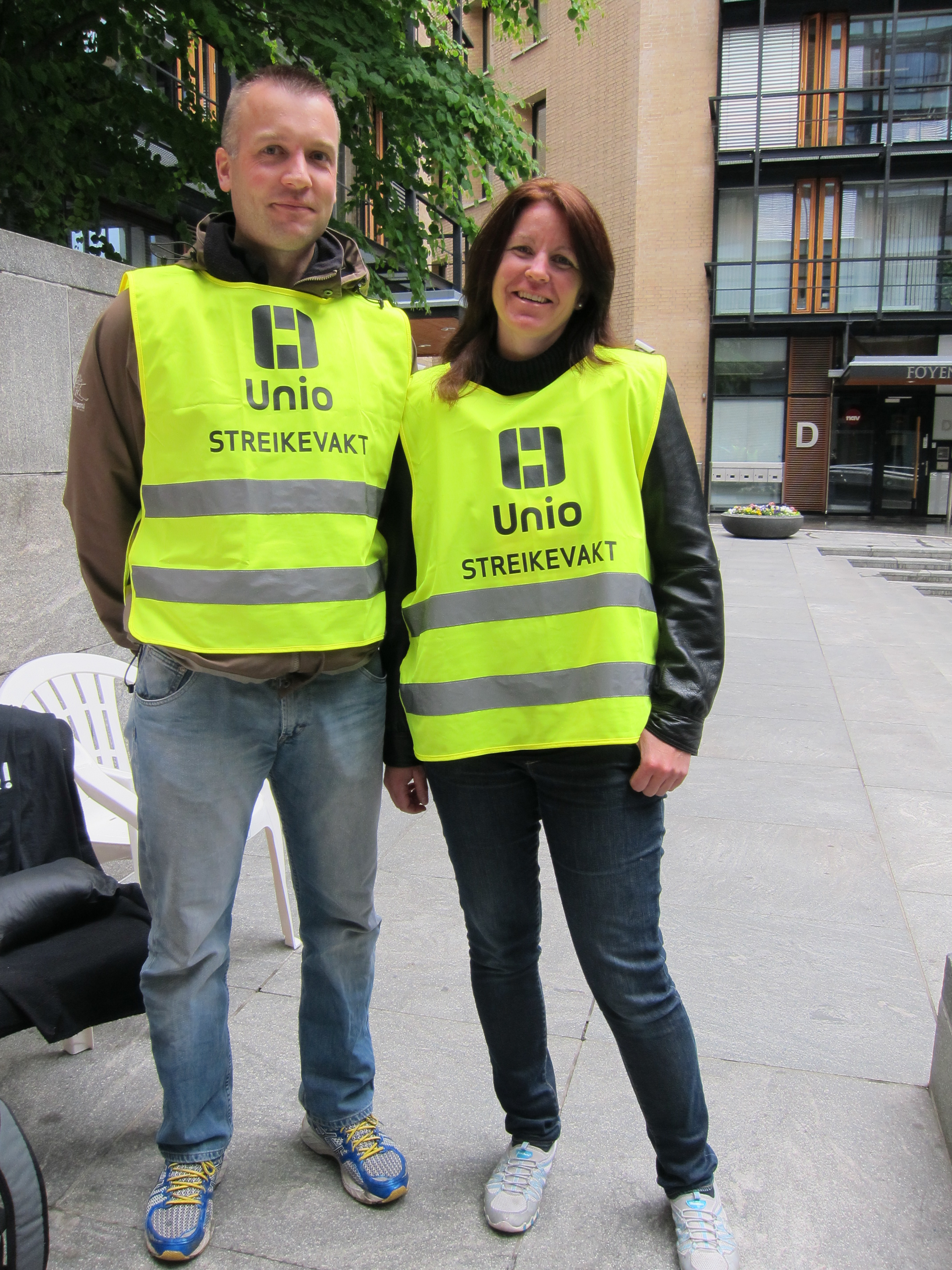
Two representatives of the Norwegian labor organisation UNIO

== Affiliates ==
Membership
| | 2018 | 2019 | Change |
|---|---|---|---|
| Association of Clergy | n.d | 2,199 | Steady |
| Association of Tax Auditors and Accountants | n.d | 530 | Steady |
| Norwegian Association of Deacons | n.d | 475 | Steady |
| Norwegian Association of Researchers | 22,690 | 22,690 | Steady |
| Norwegian Nurses Organisation | 115,580 | 118,846 | ▲2.8% |
| Norwegian Occupational Therapy Association | 4,148 | 4,325 | ▲4.3% |
| Norwegian Physiotherapist Association | 9,935 | 10,100 | ▲1.7% |
| Norwegian Society of Radiographers | n.d | 3,235 | Steady |
| Norwegian Union of Marine Engineers | 6,500 | 6,272 | ▼3.5% |
| Police Federation | 17,353 | 17,475 | ▲0.7% |
| Union of Education | 178,878 | 181,751 | ▲1.6% |
| Union of Librarians | n.d | 1,748 | Steady |
| Union of University and College Graduates | 4,981 | 5,086 | |
Sources: Statistics Norway, Unio
