= Torill Thorstad Hauger =

Norwegian novelist, children's writer, non-fiction writer and illustrator

- Born: 22 November 1943; Oslo, Norway
- Died: 4 July 2014 (aged 70)
- Occupations: Novelist, children's writer, non-fiction writer and illustrator.

Torill Thorstad Hauger (22 November 1943 – 4 July 2014) was a Norwegian novelist, children's writer, non-fiction writer and illustrator. She was the author of a number of prize-winning novels with historical themes for children and teenagers.

== Biography ==
Torill Thorstad Hauger was born in Oslo, Norway. She was raised in the neighborhood of Vika where she attended a school for art and crafts. She was enrolled at the University of Oslo where she studied German, ethnology, folklore and archaeology. During the period from 1966 to 1971, she worked at the University Museum of National Antiquities, History Museum. She made her literary début in 1976, with the prize-winning documentary Karl Eugen Olsen fra Vika. Between 1978 and 2001, she wrote children's books first with the Viking Age as a backdrop. Her subsequent books were placed in the Middle Ages with later books featuring emigration to North America. These books proved popular with several subsequent publications.

Her documentary Krestiane Kristiania from 1984 earned her the Norwegian Booksellers' Prize. She was awarded the Norwegian Critics Prize for the years best children's or youth's literature in 1980. She was awarded the Dobloug Prize in 1991. Her children's book Sigurd Drakedreper was basis for a film in 1989. Torill Thorstad Hauger was director of the Youth Literary Organization (Ungdomslitteraturens Forfatterlag) from 1980–83 and leader of the Medieval Oslo Interest Association (Interesseforeningen Oslos Middelalder) from 1995-2001. Torill Thorstad Hauger died on 4 July 2014, aged 70.

== Selected works ==
- Karl Eugen Olsen fra Vika (1976)
- Røvet av vikinger (1978)
- Flukten fra vikingene (1979)
- Det kom et skip til Bjørgvin i 1349 (1980)
- Trekk fra Oslos historie (1981)
- Sigurd Drakedreperen (1982)
- Krestiane Kristiania (1984)
- I Dorotheas hus (1986)
- Ravnejenta (1989)
- Varulven og Iselin (1992)
- Sagaen om Håkon og Kristin (1993)
- Tarzan på loftet (1993)
- Tord Illugesson (1995)
- Den store Chicagoreisen (1999)
- Ulvebarna i Vikingdalen (2003)

== Awards ==
- Norwegian Critics Prize for the years best children's or youth's literature 1980
- Norwegian Booksellers' Prize 1984
- Dobloug Prize 1991
