= Leif B. Lillegaard =

Norwegian journalist, editor, author

- Born: Leif Bryde Lillegaard; 1 May 1918; Sandnessjøen, Norway
- Died: 24 April 1994 (aged 75); Trondheim
- Occupations: Journalist; Newspaper editor Radio reporter Novelist
- Awards: Norwegian Booksellers' Prize

Leif B. Lillegaard (1 May 1918, Sandnessjøen – 24 April 1994) was a Norwegian journalist and newspaper editor, radio reporter and novelist.

== Career ==
He was editor for the newspaper Harstad Tidende, a journalist for the newspaper Morgenbladet, and a freelance radio reporter for the Norwegian Broadcasting Corporation.

He made his literary debut in 1963, with a book on the 1943 Filipstad explosion.

He wrote more than one hundred books, both fiction and non-fiction, and was awarded the Norwegian Booksellers' Prize in 1981 for the story Mor.
