= Helga Dagsland =

Norwegian nurse

- Born: 28 May 1910; Haugesund
- Died: 21 April 2003 (aged 92)
- Education: Teachers College, Columbia University
- Occupations: Nurse, teacher and organizational leader
- Awards: Florence Nightingale Medal (1971); Order of St. Olav (1981)

Helga Dagsland (28 May 1910 – 21 April 2003) was a Norwegian nurse and organizational leader.

== Personal life ==
Dagsland was born on 28 May 1910 in Haugesund, a daughter of bookseller Helje Dagsland and Gina Vatland. She did not marry, and died on 21 April 2003.

== Career ==
Dagsland passed examen artium in 1929, graduated as a nurse in Bergen in 1937, and received further education at the Teachers College, Columbia University, in the United States. In addition, she graduated as cand.philol. from the University of Oslo in 1965. She worked as a nurse for many years. From 1958 to 1977, she lectured at Norges Sykepleierhøgskole. She chaired Norsk Sykepleierforbund from 1967 to 1973. Her research works include Sykepleie – en utfordring from 1955, and Lederskap i skolen from 1965. Further publications are Når du er syk (1979), Mennesket og ledere (1980), and Sykepleie som terapi (1983).

== Awards ==
She received the Norwegian Red Cross' "Hederstegn" in 1970, was awarded the Florence Nightingale Medal from the International Red Cross in 1971, and became an honorary member of Norsk Sykepleierforbund in 1977. She was decorated Knight, First Class of the Order of St. Olav in 1981.
