= Olav Georg Folkestad =

Norwegian engineer

Olav Georg Folkestad (1 February 1902 – 1 March 1976) was a Norwegian engineer.

He was born in Skien as a son of station manager Ole Folkestad (1875–1951) and Marianne Evensen (1878–1950), and was an older brother of civil servant Anker Folkestad. In 1927 he married Agnes Sofie Aspaas. They resided in Bærum.

He finished secondary school in 1920 and graduated in engineering from the Norwegian Institute of Technology in 1924. He started out as an assistant in the Norwegian State Railways bridge division, then at the Norwegian Institute of Technology from 1926, then in the company Ing. Bonde & Co from 1927. From 1937 he spent the rest of his career as co-owner of Ing. Bonde & Co.

Folkestad chaired the Norwegian Geotechnical Institute from 1953 to 1961, Byggtjeneste from 1966 to 1968 (board member since 1957) and Norges Betongtekniske Institutt from 1967 to 1970. He and was a board member of Norges Byggforskningsinstitutt from 1953 to 1961.

He was a fellow of the Norwegian Academy of Technological Sciences, and was decorated as a Knight of the Order of St. Olav in 1962. In 1968 he won the "Bygg reis deg" statuette, and in 1969 he was given the Sam Eyde Award by the Norwegian Engineer Association. He died in March 1976 and was buried at Haslum.
