= Econa =

Norwegian trade union

Siviløkonomene
- Founded: February 28, 1939
- Headquarters: Oslo, Norway
- Location: Norway
- Members: 25,000
- Affiliations: Federation of Norwegian Professional Associations
- Website: www.sivilokonomene.no

Econa (formerly Siviløkonomene) is a Norwegian trade union for business administrators. With 20,000 members and affiliation with the Federation of Norwegian Professional Associations, it only accepts people with a master's level education in business administration, or the siviløkonom degree.

== History ==
The union was founded as Bedriftsøkonomisk Forening in Oslo on February 28, 1939, as a union for candidates from the Norwegian School of Economics and Business Administration in Bergen. The same year local divisions were created in Bergen and Kristiansund. In 1954 it took the name Norske Siviløkonomers Forening, a name held until the present was introduced in 2004. It was eventually part of Academic and Professional Unions, but broke out in 1997 to form the Federation of Norwegian Professional Associations.
