= Kjetil Bragli Alstadheim =

Norwegian journalist

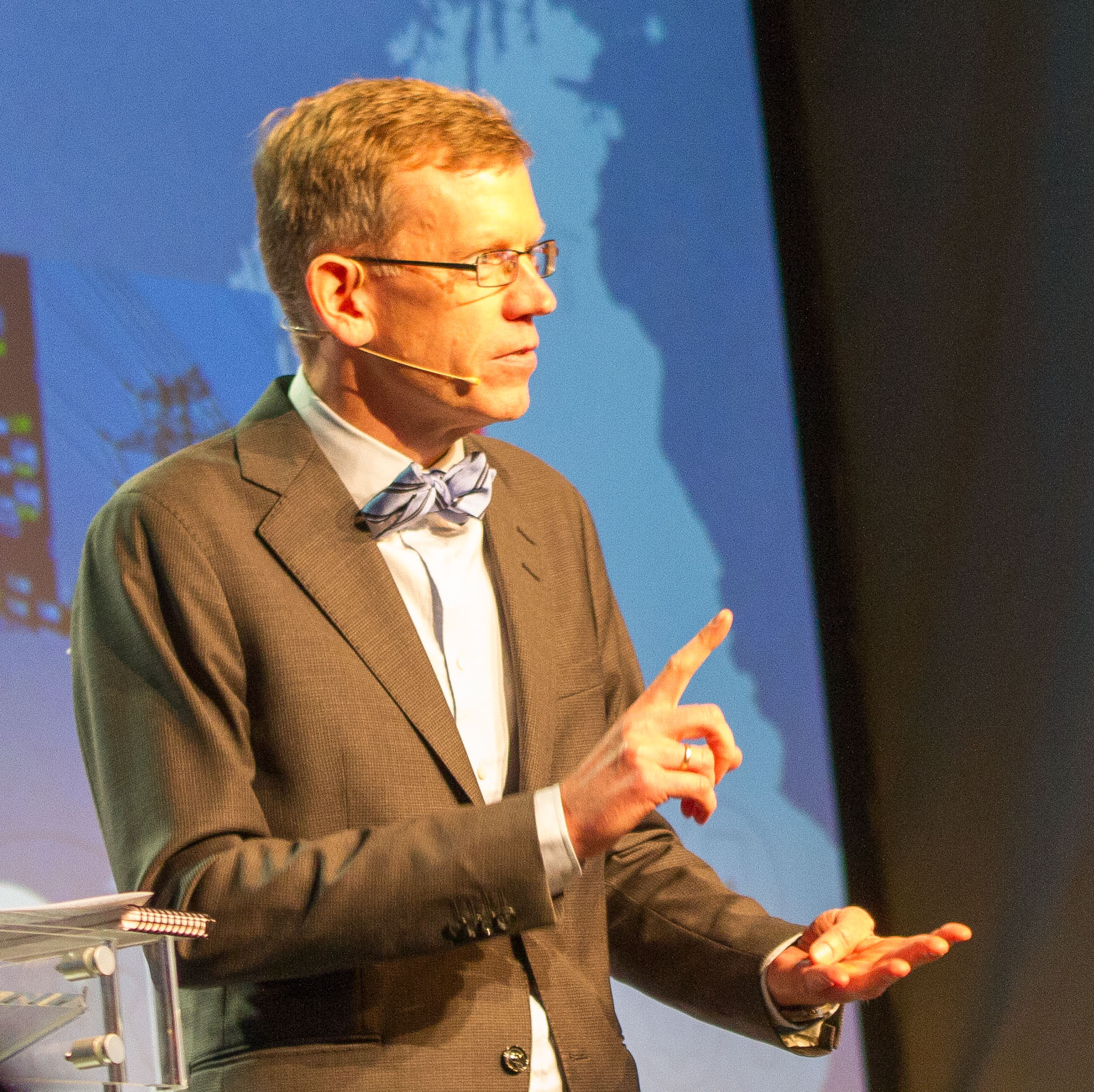
Kjetil Bragli Alstadheim, is a Norwegian journalist.

Kjetil Bragli Alstadheim (born 26 September 1968) is a Norwegian journalist.

He was the managing director of Natur og Ungdom from 1987 to 1989 and journalist in Klassekampen from 1991 to 1995. After one year in Aftenposten he was a journalist in Dagens Næringsliv from 1996, political affairs editor from 2014 to 2020, and political affairs editor in Aftenposten from 2020.
