= Anker Folkestad =

Norwegian civil servant (1914–1989)

Anker Lyder Folkestad (31 July 1914 – 28 August 1989) was a Norwegian civil servant.

He was born in Ullern as a son of station manager Ole Folkestad (1875–1951) and Marianne Evensen (1878–1950), and younger brother of engineer Olav Georg Folkestad. In 1942 he married Ragnhild Charlotte Ajaxson. They resided in Bærum.

He finished secondary school in 1933 and also took Treider School in 1937. He was subsequently hired as a secretary at Treider School before studying law. He graduated from the Royal Frederick University with the cand.jur. degree in 1945.

He worked as a secretary and consultant in the Ministry of Finance from 1946, and was promoted to assistant secretary in 1956. After a tenure as director of personnel in the Norwegian Broadcasting Corporation from 1961 to 1963, he was appointed as deputy under-secretary of state in the Ministry of Defence.

Folkestad was also a member of several public planning commissions. He died in August 1989 and was buried at Haslum.
