= Julie Christiansen =

Norwegian politician (born 1968)

Julie Christiansen (born 19 March 1968 in Harstad) is a Norwegian politician for the Conservative Party.

She was elected to the Norwegian Parliament from Akershus in 2001, but was not re-elected in 2005. She had previously served as a deputy representative during the terms 1989–1993, 1993–1997 and 1997–2001.

On the local level, Christiansen was a member of Oppegård municipality council from 1987 to 1995.

She graduated from the University of Oslo as cand.mag. in 1994 and cand.polit. in 2007. She was a research fellow at the Norwegian Atlantic Committee from 1995 to 1997 and at NUPI from 2006 to 2007. A strong European Union proponent, she was the deputy leader of the Norwegian European Movement branch from 1999 to 2001.
