= Kjell Ivar Larsen =

Norwegian politician

Kjell Ivar Larsen (born 18 June 1968) is a Norwegian politician for the Progress Party.

He served as a deputy representative to the Parliament of Norway from Vest-Agder during the terms 2005–2009, 2009–2013 and 2013–2017. He hails from Feda, from a family where both parents and a sister were active Progress Party politicians, and has been deputy mayor of Kvinesdal Municipality.
