= Gunstein Bakke =

Norwegian novelist (born 1968)

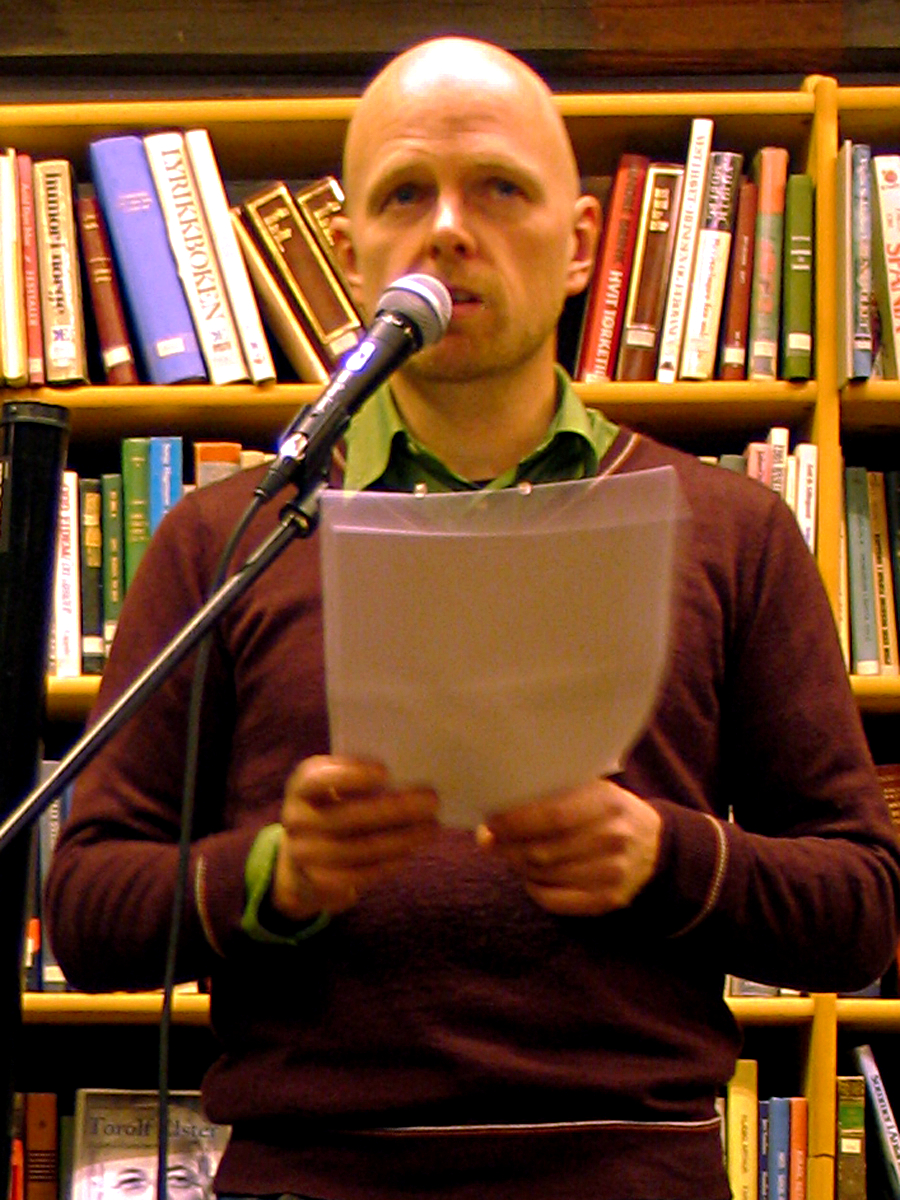
- Norwegian author Gunstein Bakke reading from his book Maud og Aud at an evening of literature in Bygland, Norway.
- Born: 30 March 1968 (age 58); Setesdal, Norwegi

Gunstein Bakke (born 30 March 1968) is a Norwegian novelist. He was born in Setesdal valley in Aust-Agder county in southern Norway. His debut novel Kontoret was published in 2000. A later novel Maud and Aud has been widely acclaimed and won the EU Prize for Literature.

Together with Eirik Ingebrigtsen, Bakke was the initiator and editor of the anthology Respons 22/7 in 2011.

Bakke lives in Gotland and Oslo.
