= Adele Enersen =

Finnish author, artist and photographer

Adele Enersen is an author, illustrator, screenwriter, photographer and blogger originally from Helsinki, Finland.

== Career ==
Enersen created a blog, Mila's Daydreams, where she posted photographs which she had taken of her daughter Mila, still an infant, in different costumes and props while she was asleep. The blog attracted worldwide attention from writers on the subject of parenting.

Enersen signed a publishing deal with HarperCollins and created two books, When My Baby Dreams and When My Baby Dreams Fairytales. With her third book titled Vincent and the Night, she signed a deal with Dial Pres, Penguin Random House. The book was immediately listed "Best Book of the Month" Editor's Pick in Amazon.com.

After the blog's popularity, her books and illustrations were featured on international television news and were reviewed in magazines and websites around the world, which in turn increased the readership of her blog.
