= Anders Folkestad =

Norwegian teacher and unionist

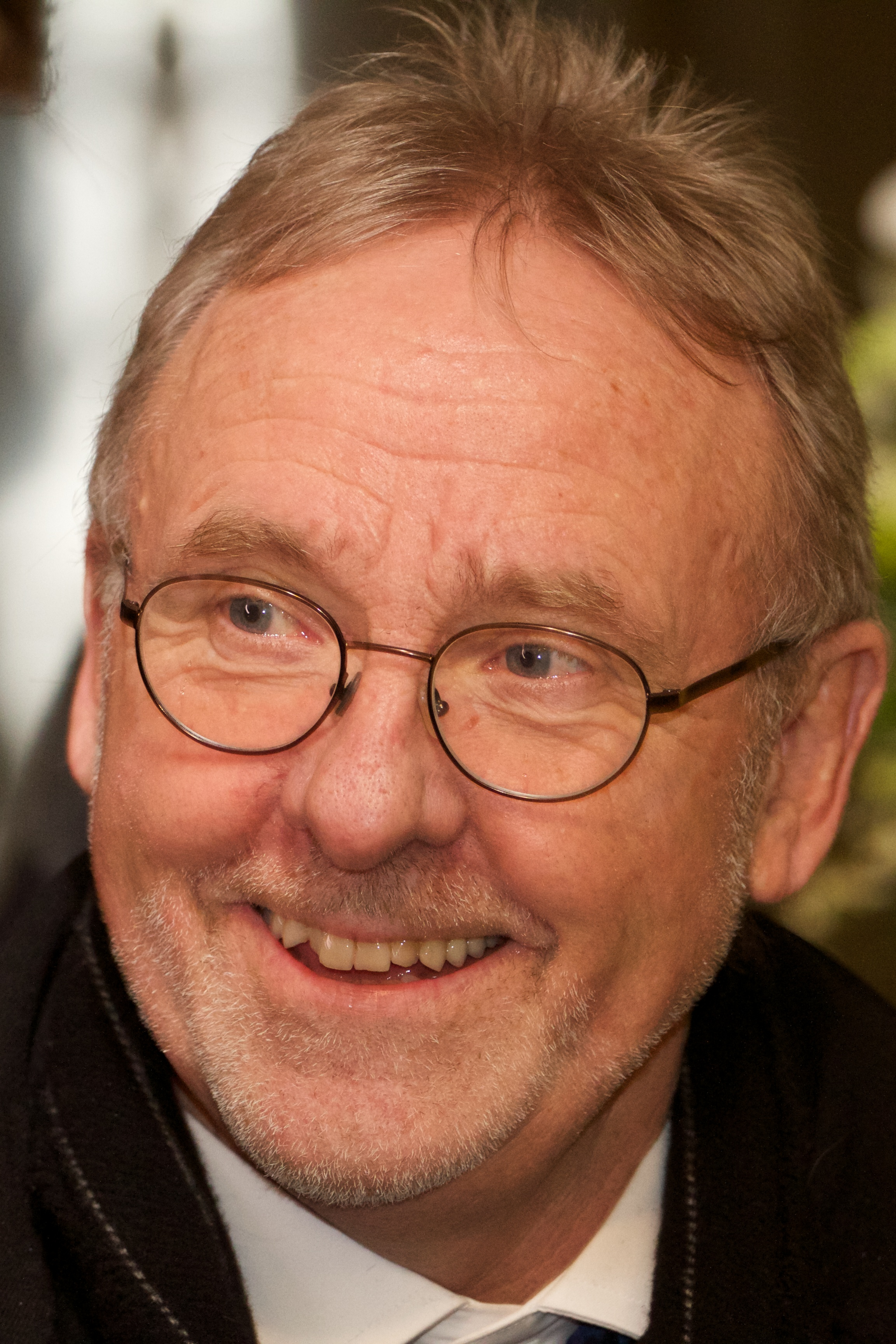
- Folkestad in 2014
- Born: 16 March 1949 (age 76); Volda Municipality, Norway
- Occupations: schoolteacher and trade unionist

Anders Folkestad (born 16 March 1949) is a Norwegian schoolteacher and trade unionist.

He was born in Volda Municipality, and worked as schoolteacher in secondary schools in Odda Municipality and Stranda Municipality. He chaired the trade union Norsk Undervisningsforbund from 1992 to 1993, and Lærerforbundet from 1993. From 2002 to 2015 he chaired the Confederation of Unions for Professionals, Norway.
