= Lars Mytting =

Norwegian writer

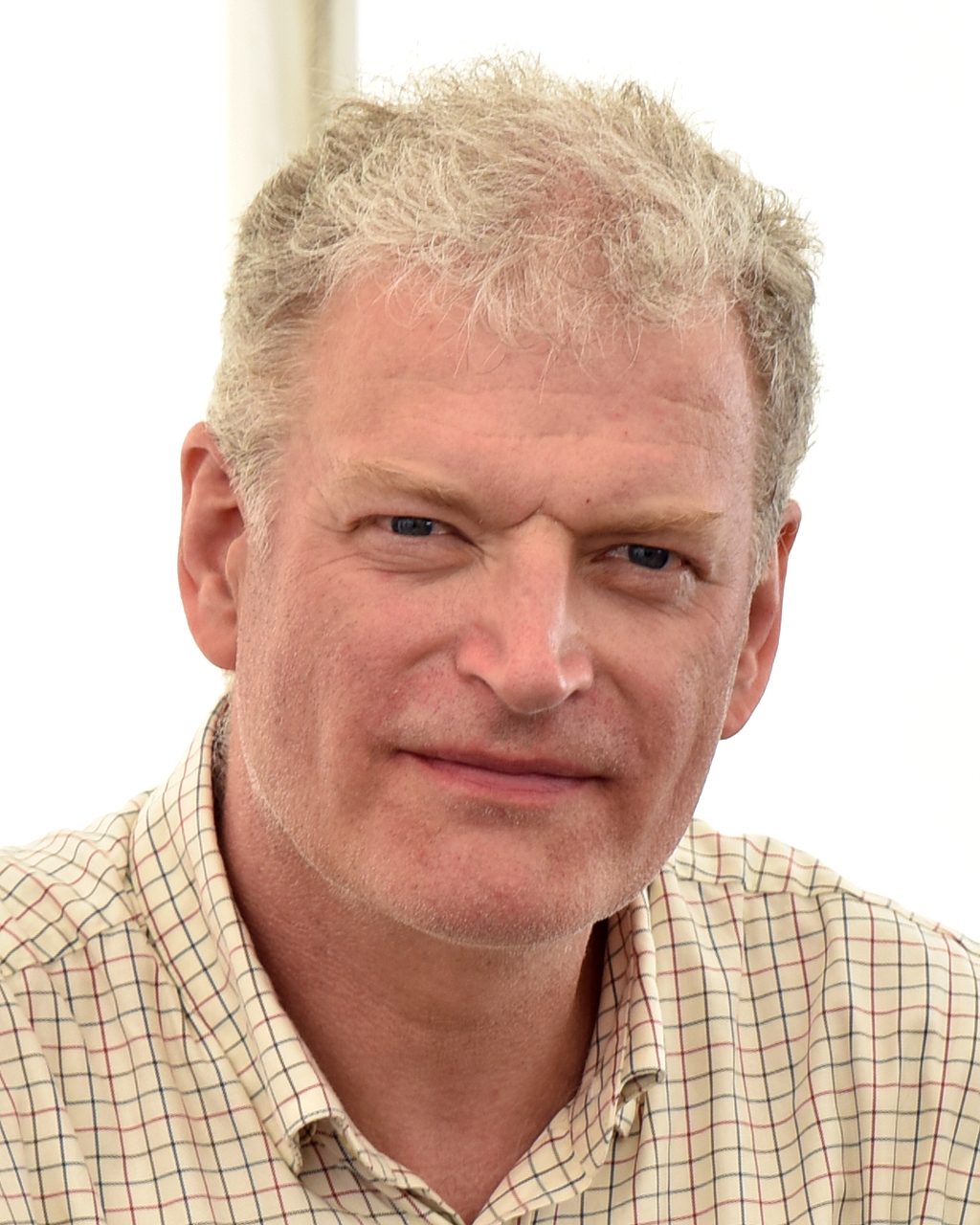
- Born: 1 March 1968 (age 58); Fåvang, Norway
- Occupation: Writer
- Awards: Norwegian Booksellers' Prize (2014); Dobloug Prize (2022)
- Website: larsmytting.com

Lars Mytting (born 1 March 1968) is a Norwegian writer.

Born in Fåvang on 1 March 1968, he achieved international success in 2011 with the non-fiction book Hel ved, selling over 300,000 copies internationally. His awards include the Norwegian Booksellers' Prize and the Dobloug Prize.

== Career ==
Mytting worked as a journalist for Dagningen, Aftenposten and Arbeiderbladet. He later worked as an editor for many years before his first novel was published.

Mytting made his literary debut in 2006 with the novel Hestekrefter, where focus partly is on cars. His next novel, Vårofferet from 2010, centers around life as a soldier and military equipment.

His non-fiction book Hel ved from 2011 was his breakthrough internationally, selling over 300,000 copies globally. The book discusses chopping, stacking and drying firewood. The English translation of Hel ved, Norwegian Wood, was awarded the 2016 British Book Industry award for best non-fiction book. Heil ved, a stage show based on the book and with music by Stein Torleif Bjella was created in 2023.

In 2014, his novel Svøm med dem som drukner was published, for which he was awarded the 2014 Norwegian Booksellers' Prize. The story follows a Norwegian farmer as he attempts to uncover the truth about his parents' mysterious death. The Sixteen Trees of the Somme, the English translation, was nominated for the 2019 Dublin Literary Award.

He has further issued the historical novels Søsterklokkene (2018), Hekneveven (2020) and Skråpånatta (2023), which make up the Hekne trilogy, known in English as the Sister Bells trilogy. The trilogy blends historical and folkloric elements and focuses on the inhabitants of the fictional village of Butangen over multiple generations. Hekneveven and Skråpånatta were the best-selling books in Norway in their respective years of publication. Each of the three books earned Mytting a nomination for the Norwegian Booksellers' Prize.

Mytting was awarded the Dobloug Prize in 2022.

== Personal life ==
As of 2018, Mytting lived near Østerdalen with his wife and two children.

== Works ==
=== Fiction ===
- Hestekrefter (2006) ISBN 8205366780
- Vårofferet (2010) ISBN 8205387249
- Svøm med dem som drukner (2014) ISBN 8242159017

==== The Sister Bells Trilogy ====
- Søsterklokkene (2018) ISBN 8205514003
- Hekneveven (2020) ISBN 8205539057
- Skråpånatta (2023) ISBN 8205569797

=== Non-fiction ===
- Hel ved (2011) ISBN 8248910490

== Works in Translation ==
=== English ===
- Hel ved: Norwegian Wood (2015). Translated by Robert Ferguson. MacLehose Press. ISBN 9780857052551
- Svøm med dem som drukner: The Sixteen Trees of the Somme (2017). Translated by Paul Russell Garrett. MacLehose Press. ISBN 9780857056047
- Søsterklokkene: The Bell in the Lake (2020). Translated by Deborah Dawkin. MacLehose Press. ISBN 9780857059376
- Hekneveven: The Reindeer Hunters (2022). Translated by Deborah Dawkin. MacLehose Press. ISBN 9781529416060
- Skråpånatta: The Night of the Scourge (2025). Translated by Deborah Dawkin. MacLehose Press. ISBN 9781529435863

=== Spanish ===
- Hel ved: El libro de la madera (2016). Translated by Kristina Solum and Antón Lado. Alfaguara. ISBN 9788420424149
- Svøm med dem som drukner: Los dieciséis árboles del Somme (2017). Translated by Cristina Gómez Baggethun. Alfaguara. ISBN 9788420426778
- Søsterklokkene: Las Campanas Gamelas (2020). Translated by Lotte Katrine Tollefsen. Alfaguara. ISBN 9788420435756
