= Norwegian Nurses Organisation =

- Norsk Sykepleierforbund
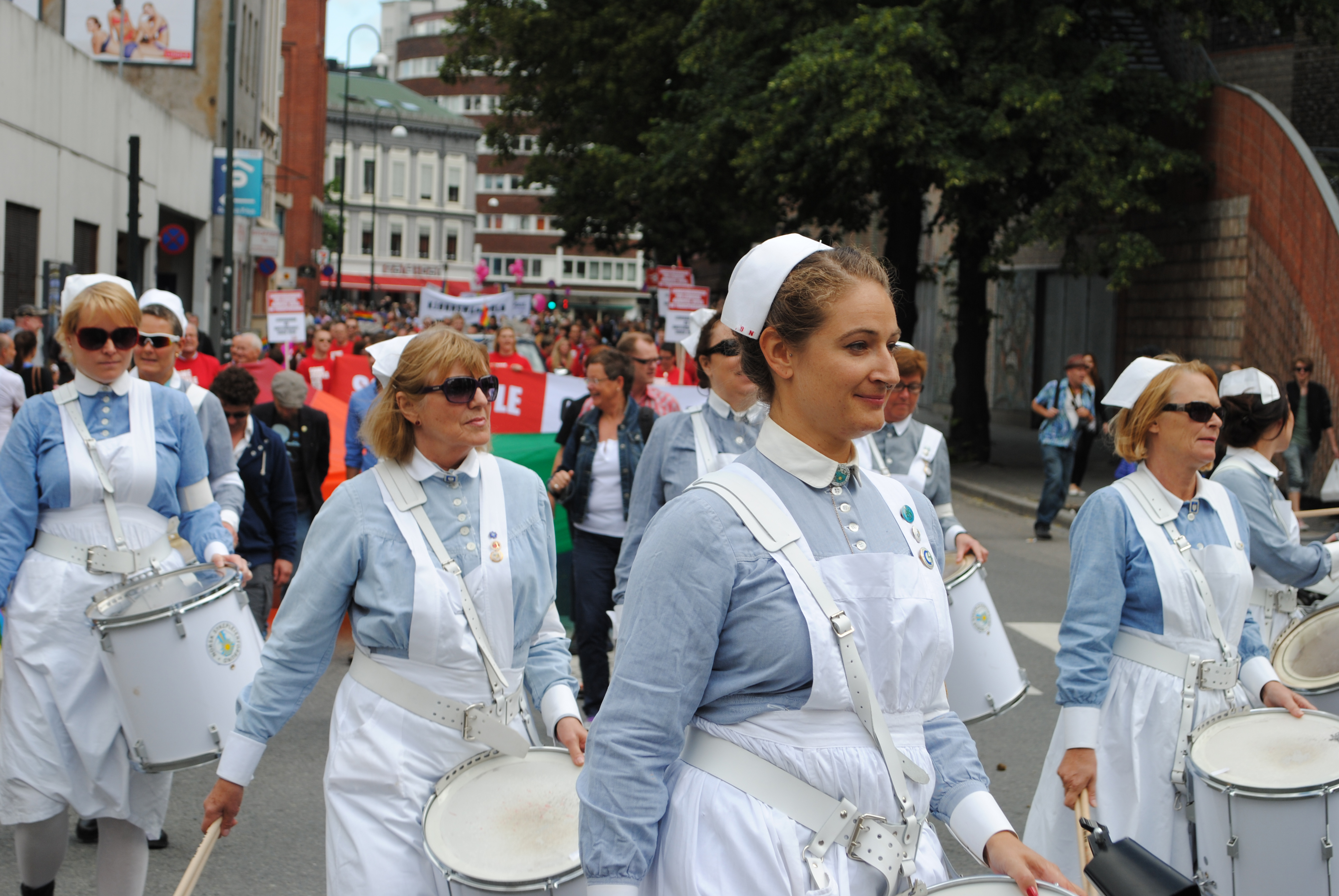
- Founded: 24 September 1912
- Location: Norway
- Members: 118 846 (2019)
- Publication: Sykepleien
- Parent organization: Unio
- Affiliations: ICN, PSI, Unio
- Website: nsf.no

The Norwegian Nurses Organisation (NNO) (Norsk Sykepleierforbund, NSF) is a national professional association and trade union representing over 110,000 registered nurses, midwives and nursing students in Norway. It was founded in 1912 by Bergljot Larsson. The organisation's objectives focus on professional, social, and representational policies, concerning areas such as public health, ethical nursing standards, as well as collective bargaining aimed at improving wages, hours, working conditions and benefits. NNO is politically neutral and has some 3000 elected union representatives. Its president since 7 November 2019 is Lill Sverresdatter Larsen.

== History ==
24 September 1912, Bergljot Larsson gathered 44 fellow nurses from across the country to a meeting in Kristiania lasting two days. This date marks the foundation of the NNO, and has since been considered the first general assembly. At the foundation, the organisation's name was decided upon, as well as statutes, emblem, and first ever periodical Sykepleien (the Norwegian word for nursing). Bergljot Larsson was elected chairwoman and editor of the journal. She held the position as president until 1935, and finally retiring from organisational work in 1947.
