= Beate Heieren Hundhammer =

Norwegian politician (born 1968)

Beate Heieren Hundhammer (born 24 September 1968 in Oslo) is a Norwegian politician for the Conservative Party.

She was elected to the Norwegian Parliament from Buskerud in 2001, but was not re-elected in 2005. She served in the position of deputy representative during the terms 1993–1997, 1997–2001 and 2005–2009.
