= Bergljot Larsson =

Norwegian nurse, educator, editor and organizational leader (1883–1968)

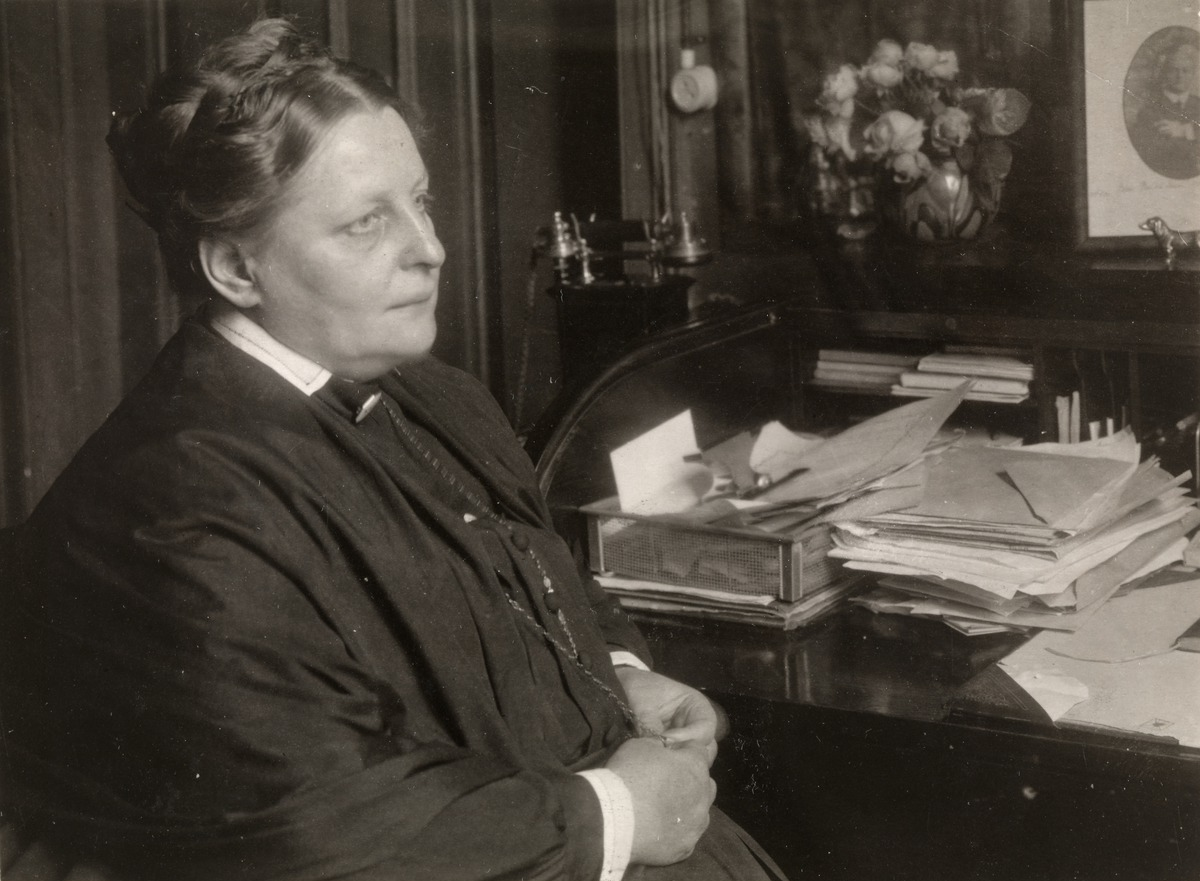
- Bergljot Larsson ca. 1930
- Born: 9 July 1883; Kristiania, Norway
- Died: 29 December 1968 (aged 85)
- Occupations: nurse, educator, editor and organizational leader

Bergljot Larsson (9 July 1883 – 29 December 1968) was a Norwegian nurse, educator, editor and organizational leader. She was a founding member of the Norwegian Nurses Organization (Norsk Sykepleierforbund) which she chaired from 1912 until 1935.

== Biography ==
She was born in Kristiania (now Oslo), Norway. She was a daughter of drawing teacher Ludvig Gustav Larsson (1857–1911) and Hilma Kristiane Hansen (1860–1937) She was a sister of artist Brynjulf Larsson (1881–1920). She grew up at Rodeløkka in Kristiania. In 1905, Larsson took a one-year education for nurses at Kristiania Municipal Nursing School (later Ullevål College of Nursing). From 1908 to 1911, she worked at hospitals in Edinburgh. This included the Royal Infirmary of Edinburgh (RIE) where she met Annie Warren Gill, Lady Superintendent of RIE and Ethel Bedford Fenwick, an international figure who at that time was the leader of the national campaign for state registration of nurses in the UK and founder and President of the International Council of Nurses (ICN). Larsson was also influenced by the strong suffragette movement in Edinburgh at this time, including the work of the active Edinburgh Women’s Suffrage Society.

She later completed several short-term study stays in Europe and North America. .

In 1912, Larsson participated in the International Council of Nurses World Conference in Cologne, Germany. She subsequently founded the Norwegian Nurses Organization (Norsk Sykepleierforbund) in 1912. She chaired the association from 1912 to 1935. From its foundation, the Norwegian Nursing Association was an organization for educated nurses and advocated for three-year basic education for all nurses. After she resigned as chairman, she continued as secretary general and head of Nursing School operated by Norsk Sykepleierforbund. Larsson also edited the Nursing Journal (Sykepleien) from 1912 until her retirement in 1947.

In 1919, she received the King's Medal of Merit (Kongens fortjenstmedalje) in gold, and in 1949 she was appointed as a Knight 1st Class in the Order of St. Olav. She died in Oslo and was buried in Vestre Gravlund.

== Related reading ==
- Bergljot Larsson (1883–1968) (Nordic Journal of Nursing Research. Vol 15, Issue 3, 1995)
- Sigrun Hvalvik (2005) Bergljot Larsson og den moderne sykepleien (Oslo: Akribe AS)
