= Finn Alnæs =

Norwegian novelist (1932–1991)

- Born: 20 January 1932; Bærum, Norway
- Died: 3 November 1991 (aged 59)
- Occupation: Novelist
- Relatives: Eyvind Alnæs (grandfather)
- Awards: Norwegian Booksellers' Prize; Norwegian Critics Prize for Literature

Finn Alnæs (20 January 1932 – 3 November 1991) was a Norwegian novelist. He was born in Bærum. He made his literary debut with the novel Koloss (1963).

Alnæs was awarded the Norwegian Booksellers' Prize and the Norwegian Critics Prize for Literature in 1968 for the novel Gemini. Both his books Koloss and Gemini were nominated for the Nordic Council's Literature Prize, but did not win the prize.

== Awards ==
- Norwegian Booksellers' Prize 1968
- Norwegian Critics Prize for Literature 1968
