= Norwegian Booksellers' Prize =

Norwegian literary award

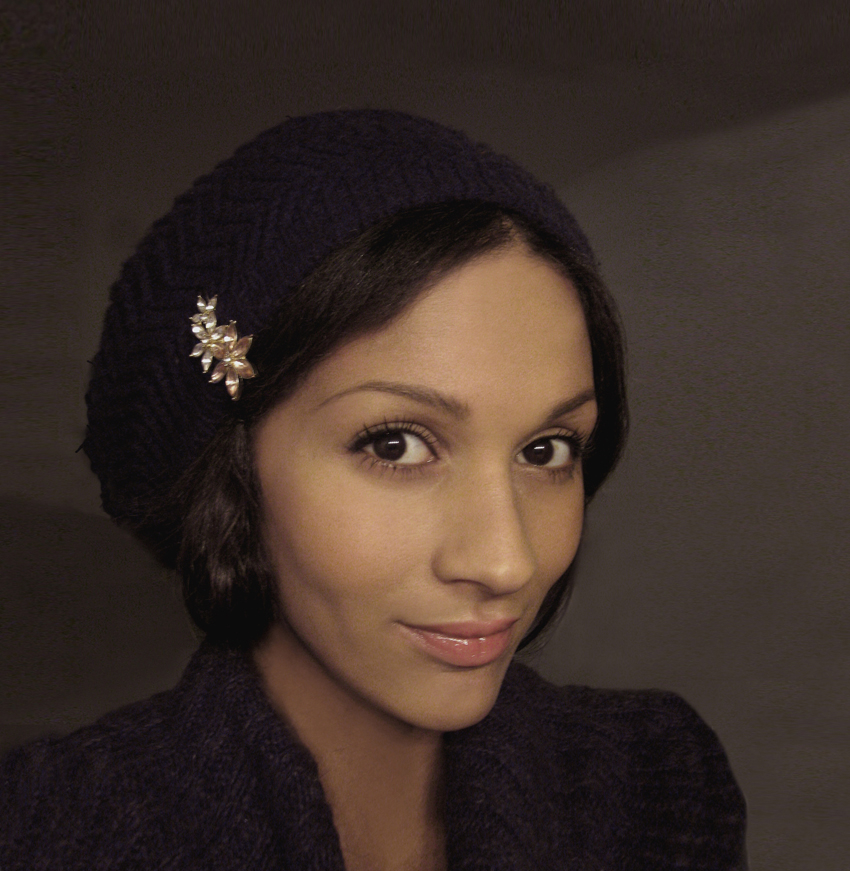
Lisa Aisato, winner of 2019.

The Norwegian Booksellers' Prize (Bokhandlerprisen) is a literature prize awarded annually by the Norwegian Booksellers Association after voting among all who work in Norwegian bookstores.

The prize is awarded for one of the year's books in the fiction / general literature category, including children's and youth books. The prize was initiated in 1948, then did not return until 1961. It was also on a hiatus from 1970 to 1980.

== Prize winners ==
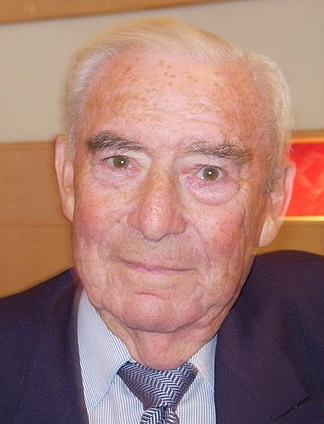
Jo Benkow, 1985 winner

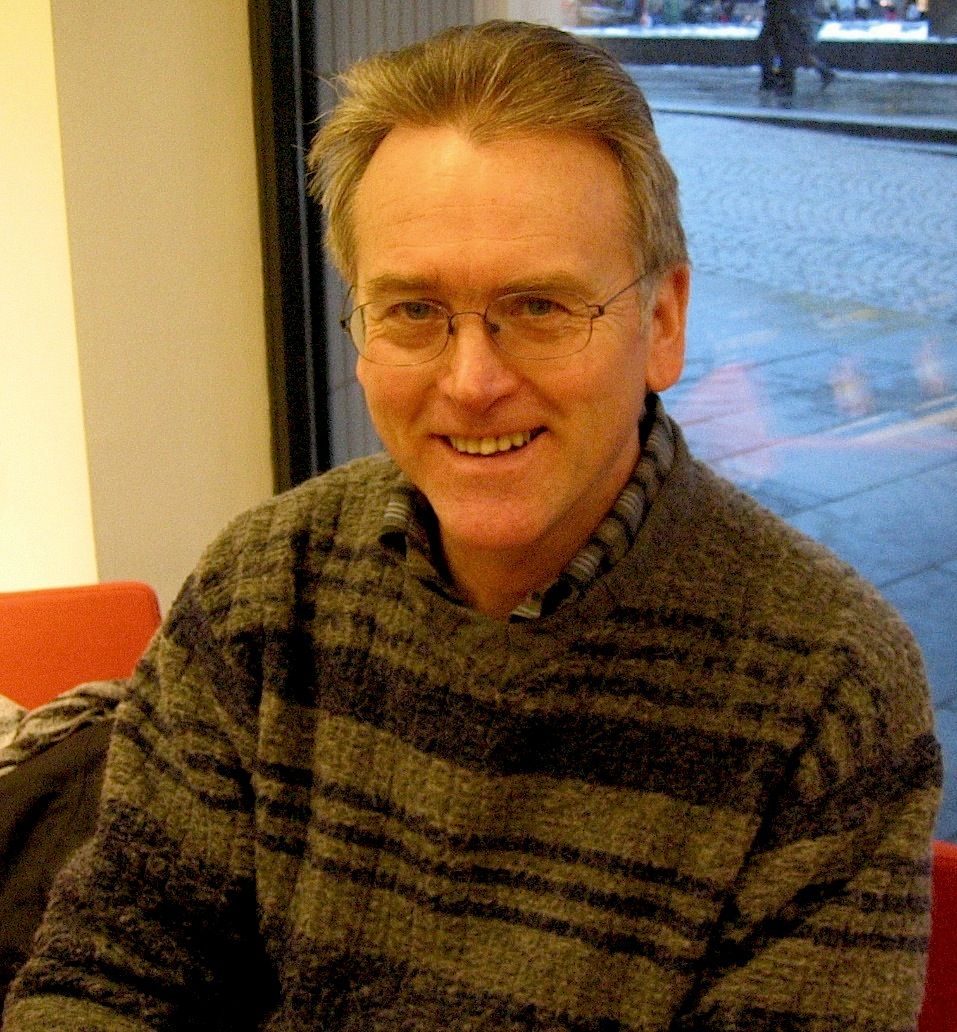
Gunnar Staalesen, 1989 winner

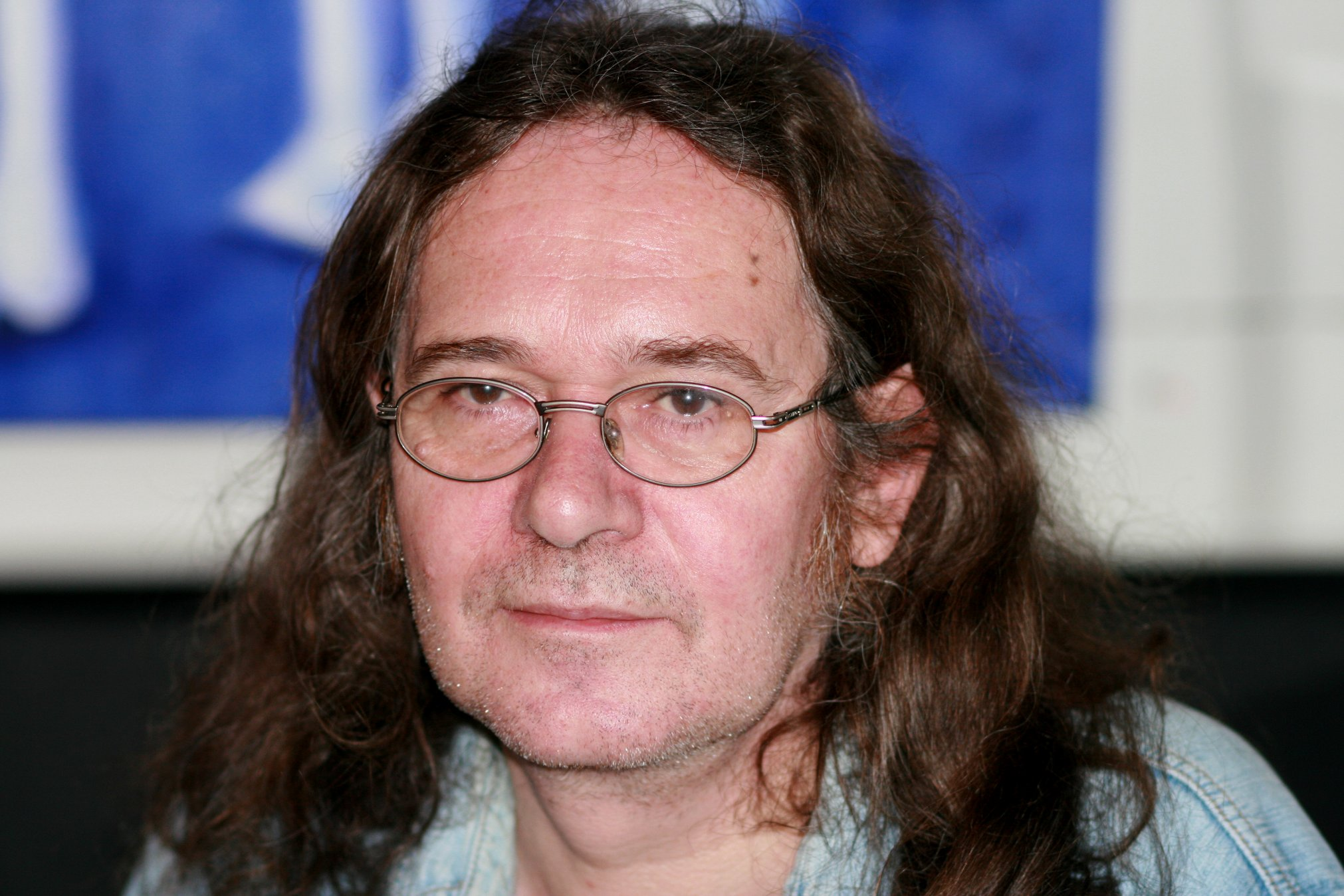
Ingvar Ambjørnsen, 1996 winner

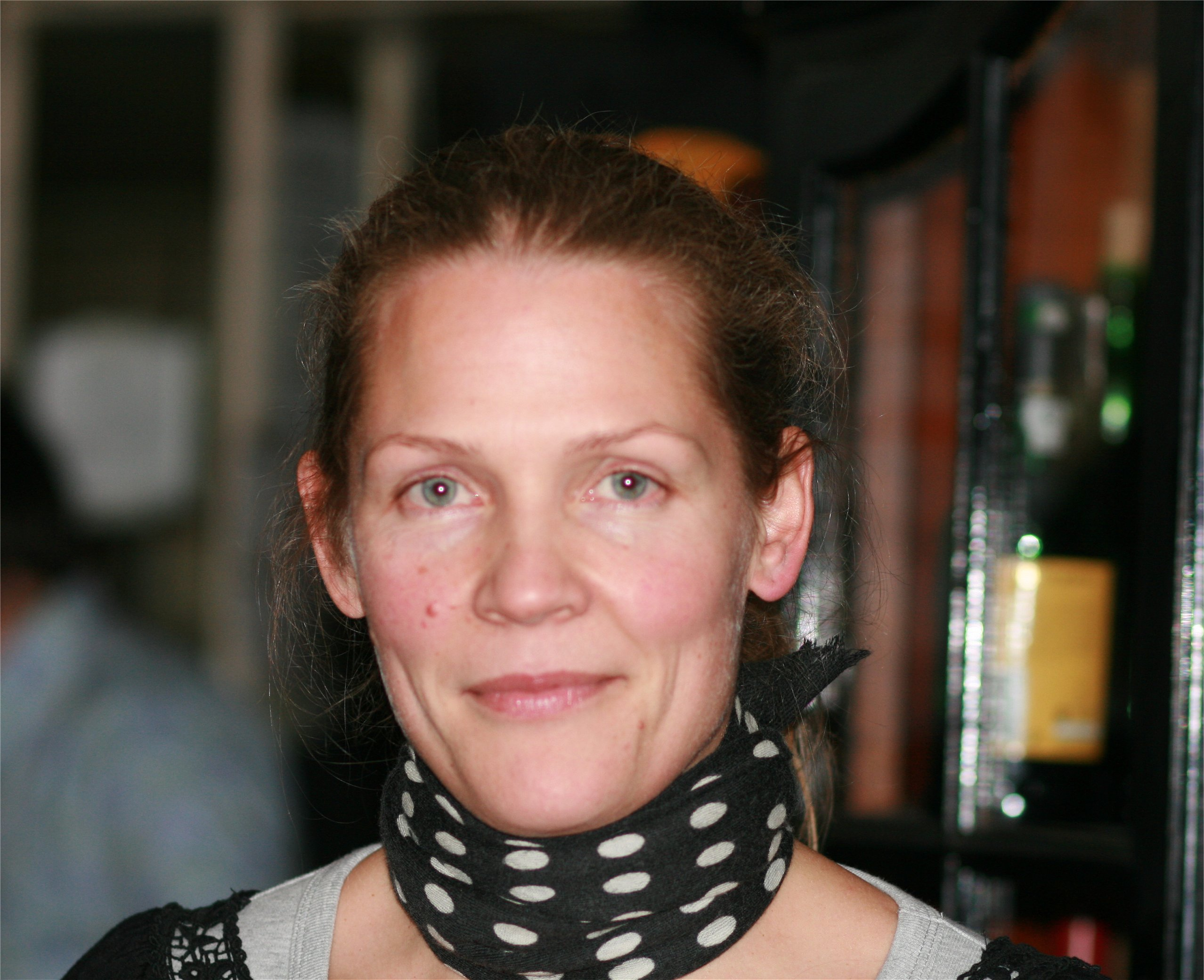
Åsne Seierstad, 2002 winner

- 1948 – Sigurd Hoel
- 1961 – Kristian Kristiansen
- 1962 – Vera Henriksen
- 1963 – Terje Stigen
- 1964 – Elisabeth Dored
- 1965 – Johan Borgen
- 1966 – Ebba Haslund
- 1967 – Kristian Kristiansen and Tarjei Vesaas
- 1968 – Odd Eidem and Hans Heiberg
- 1969 – Finn Alnæs and Richard Herrmann
- 1981 – Leif B. Lillegaard
- 1982 – Anne Karin Elstad
- 1983 – Herbjørg Wassmo
- 1984 – Torill Thorstad Hauger
- 1985 – Jo Benkow
- 1986 – Anne-Cath. Vestly
- 1987 – Fredrik Skagen
- 1988 – Bjørg Vik
- 1989 – Gunnar Staalesen
- 1990 – Lars Saabye Christensen
- 1991 – Roy Jacobsen
- 1992 – Karsten Alnæs
- 1993 – Jostein Gaarder
- 1994 – Klaus Hagerup
- 1995 – Anne Holt
- 1996 – Ingvar Ambjørnsen
- 1997 – Karin Fossum
- 1998 – Erik Fosnes Hansen
- 1999 – Erlend Loe
- 2000 – Jo Nesbø
- 2001 – Lars Saabye Christensen
- 2002 – Åsne Seierstad
- 2003 – Per Petterson
- 2004 – Levi Henriksen
- 2005 – Anne B. Ragde
- 2006 – Erik Fosnes Hansen
- 2007 – Jo Nesbø
- 2008 – Tore Renberg
- 2009 – Roy Jacobsen
- 2010 – Jan-Erik Fjell
- 2011 – Jørn Lier Horst
- 2012 – Per Petterson
- 2013 – Cecilie Enger
- 2014 – Lars Mytting
- 2015 – Maja Lunde
- 2016 – Vigdis Hjorth
- 2017 – Helga Flatland
- 2018 – Simon Stranger
- 2019 – Lisa Aisato
- 2020 – Tore Renberg
- 2021 – Abid Raja
- 2022 – Zeshan Shakar
- 2023 – Oliver Lovrenski
- 2024 – Erika Fatland
- 2025 – Åsne Seierstad
- 2026 – Vetle Lid Larssen
