= Jørgen Wilhelm Rudolph =

Norwegian businessperson (1881–1968)

Jørgen Wilhelm Thrue Rudolph III (11 December 1881 – 11 February 1968) was a Norwegian businessperson.

He was born in Drammen and took commercial training for three years in Germany, England in France. He had a dry goods wholesaling company in Drammen of which he became sole owner in 1919.

He was a board member of the employers' association Manufakturgrossistenes landsforening and Den Norske Kalosje- & Gummivarefabrik, supervisory council member of Drammens og Oplands nye Privatbank and Forsikringsselskapet Norge and control committee member of Drammens Sparebank.
