= Norwegian Society of Engineers and Technologists =

NITO
- Norwegian Society of Engineers and Technologists
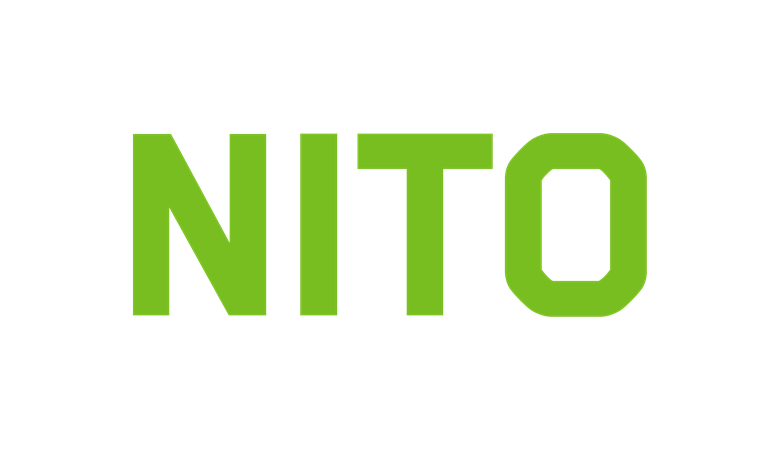
- Founded: March 1, 1936; 90 years ago
- Headquarters: Oslo
- Location: Norway
- Members: 120,000
- Key people: Egil Thompson, Trond Markussen, Kjetil Lein

The Norwegian Society of Engineers and Technologists (Norwegian: Norges Ingeniør- og Teknologorganisasjon; NITO) is the largest union in engineering in Norway with approximately 110 000 members. NITO has 21 regional branches covering the country and over 2,000 local clubs and shop stewards. Most of the working members are affiliated to a local club. The local clubs or workshops are organisationally placed directly under the regional branches. With a few exceptions the branches follow Norway's county borders.

NITO was established in 1936 and is an independent, non-affiliated, and non-political union.

NITO is led by a Board of Representatives. The daily work of the union is carried out by shop stewards and elected union representatives at different organisational levels; by the secretariat and main office in Oslo, consisting of the general secretary and 75 employees; and by the 23 employees who run the branch offices.

== Presidents and Secretaries General ==
Presidents

- Frithjof Svendsen (1936–1937)
- Einar I. Larsen (1937–1941)
- Arne G. Myhrvold (1941–1948)
- Brynil Brynjulfsen (1948–1952)
- Erling Willoch (1952–1954)
- Arne H. Johansen (1954–1968)
- Trygve Hanæs (1968–1975)
- Lars Harlem (1975–1979)
- Harald Skuggedal (1979–1983)
- Gunnar Hamre (1983–1987)
- Jan Abrahamsen (1987–1990)
- Svein Erik Andresen (1990–1995)
- Svein Vikhals (1995–1998)
- Roger Johansen (1998–2000)
- John A. Haugen (2000–2003)
- Marit Stykket (2003–2012)
- Trond Markussen (fra 2012)

Secretaries General

- Modolf Guttelvik (1945–1946)
- Oddvar de Lange (1946–1950)
- Knut Reistad (konstituert) (1950–1951)
- Trygve Sommerhein (1951–1968)
- Erik Bjore (1968–1981)
- Anth. B. Nilsen (1981–1992)
- Erik Prytz (1992–2011)
- Steinar Sørlie (fra 2011)
- Egil Thompson (fra 2022)

== Honorary Members ==
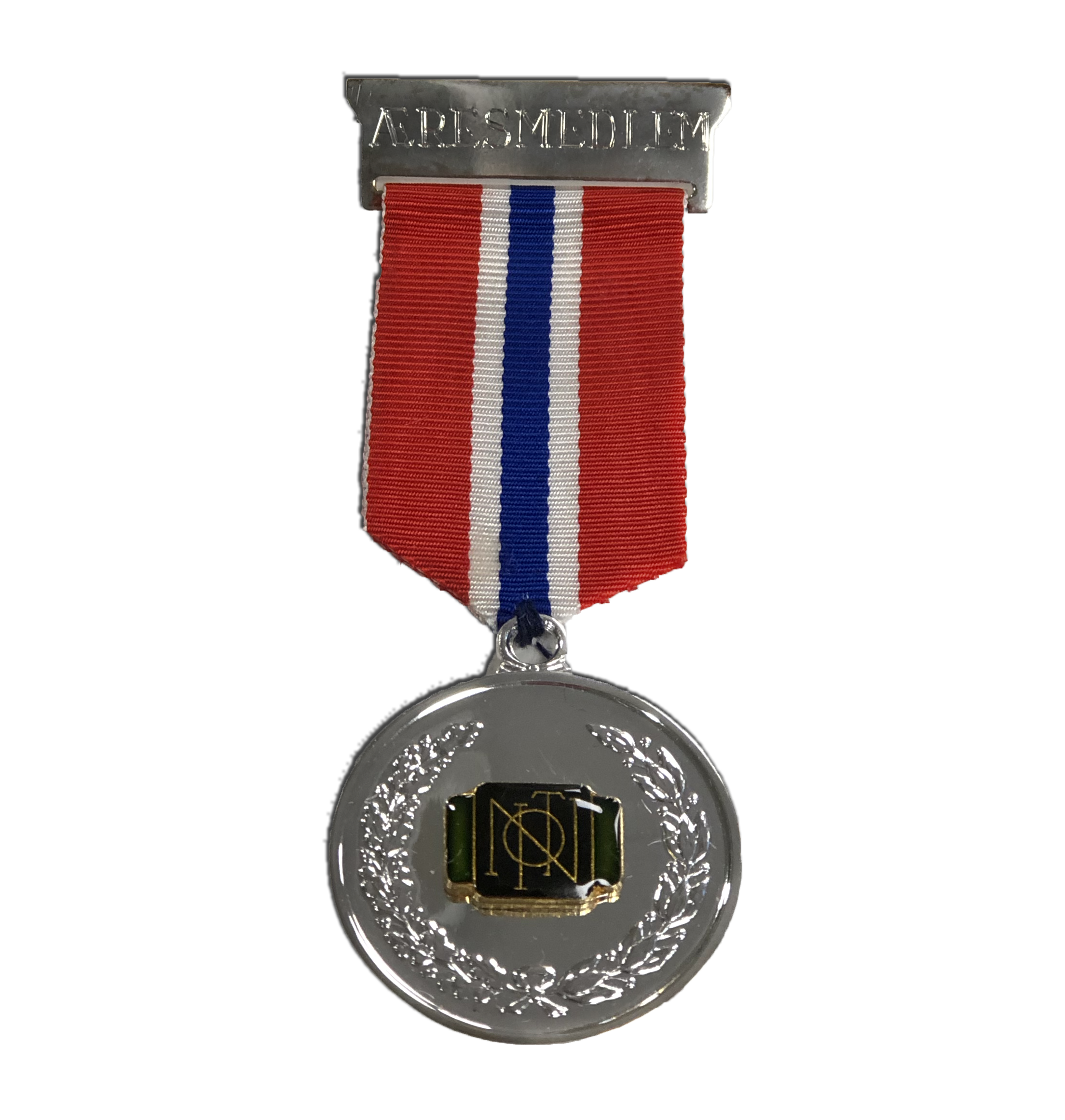
NITO medal of honor. Logo established in 1954.

#	Name	Location	Year
1	Albert Faugner	Oslo	September 15, 1938
2	Fridtjof Svendsen	Oslo	September 15, 1938
3	Jens Glad Balchen	Kristiansand	November 6, 1954
4	Georg Solheim	Oslo	November 6, 1954
5	Arne G. Myhrvold	Oslo	November 3, 1956
6	Alfred Vossgård	Bergen	November 3, 1956
7	Erling Willoch	Oslo	May 27, 1961
8	Arnold Jensen	Sør-Trøndelag	June 13, 1964
9	Johan E. Paashe	Bergen	June 13, 1964
10	Arne H. Johansen	Oslo	May 25, 1968
11	Bergsvein Olsberg	Sør-Trøndelag	June 2, 1973
12	Ragnar Hartsang	Oslo	June 2, 1973
13	Trygve Hanæs	Oslo	May 31, 1975
14	Lars Harlem	Oslo	May 23, 1981
15	Magnar G. Huseby	Sør-Trøndelag	May 23, 1981
16	Harald Skuggedal	Oslo	June 8, 1985
17	Knut Nordal	Nedre Telemark	July 8, 1985
18	Gunnar Hamre	Bergen	May 23, 1987
19	Jan Abrahamsen	Moss	December 1, 1990
20	Svein Erik Andersen	Vest-Agder	November 23, 1996
21	Odd Skaug	Oslo	December 2, 2000
22	Svein Vikhals	Østfold	December 2, 2000
23	Roger Johansen	Østfold	September 27, 2003
24	John Arne Haugen	Oppland	September 27, 2003
25	Aage Frantzen	Nordland	October 1, 2006
26	Kjell Harry Olaussen	Østfold	October 1, 2006
27	Leif Eskedal	Hordaland	October 1, 2009
28	Marit Stykket	Buskerud	September 29, 2009
