= Svein Enersen =

Norwegian footballer and editor (born 1968)

Personal information
- Date of birth: 12 February 1968 (age 58)
- Height: 1.79 m (5 ft 10 in)
- Position: Defender

Youth career
- –1983: Nærbø
- 1984: Bryne
- 1984: Viking

Senior career*
Years	Team	Apps	(Gls)
1985–1987	Viking		
1988–1989	Vidar		
1990	Stord		
1990	→ Eiger (loan)		
1991	Moss		
1992–1993	Bryne		
1994	Kongsvinger	21	(0)
1995	Bryne		
1996	Start	14	(0)
1997	Bryne	4	(0)

International career
1984	Norway U16	3	(0)
1985	Norway U19	4	(1)
1986	Norway U21	2	(0)
- * Club domestic league appearances and goals

Svein Enersen (born 12 February 1968) is a Norwegian newspaper editor and retired football defender. He played in the highest Norwegian league for Viking, Kongsvinger and Start, and the second highest league for Viking, Vidar, Stord, Moss and Bryne–serving as team captain in several of the teams. A journeyman, he also had a spell in the third tier with Eiger.

== Early career ==
Enersen played youth football for Nærbø IL and a short time for Bryne FK before joining Viking FK. He became a part of their senior team, playing 35 games for Viking in the highest Norwegian league of 1985 and 1986. During that time he also played twice for Norway U-17, four times for Norway U-20 and once for Norway U-21. He also got his sole appearance in European competition, which was the away leg against Legia Warszawa in the 1985–86 UEFA Cup. At the end of 1986, Viking were relegated to the second tier, where Enersen continued his career.

His playing style was described as that of "ball winner" and "labourer" in central midfield. During the winter of 1986–87, Enersen also played handball on the youth team of Viking HK.

In 1987 Enersen grew discontent with his role in Viking. After sitting on the bench throughout the 1987 season opener against Varegg, Enersen reportedly issued an ultimatum: if he did not play the next match, he would leave the club. He also met IK Start for "informal" transfer talks. Enersen wanted to leave the club after the season, contacted the other Stavanger-based club on the second tier, FK Vidar, and came to an agreement to join the club. Viking demanded 170,000 kr–175,000 for the player, a fee that was disputed by Vidar. Viking's chairman also claimed that the transfer was a breach of contract by Enersen. Enersen countered with numerous claims of Viking treating him unfairly and "childishly".

== Journeyman career ==
FK Vidar started the 1988 1. divisjon in a promising manner, but lost out on promotion in the last round. To Vidar's dismay, Viking was the team that clinched promotion. When joining Vidar, Svein Enersen thought he joined the better Stavanger team, but in hindsight he saw his error in abandoning Viking.

Enersen continued in Vidar in 1989, even serving as team captain. After that, it became clear that Enersen was looking for a new club. IK Start, Djerv 1919, Molde and Brann were mentioned as possible clubs, but Enersen chose Stord IL. While Stord was an amateur club, the plan was for the club to help Enersen enrol in the local college (what later became Stord/Haugesund University College). According to Enersen, the spell in Stord "was as big as a failure can get. What I experienced in that club, I wouldn't wish upon my greatest enemy". The teaching actually took place in Haugesund, not Stord, which caused Enersen to give up and move back to Stavanger. First, it was decided that he would commute to Stord to only play for the team during the weekends. This solution did not work. Among others, one flight from Sola Airport was cancelled, with Enersen missing the match of the weekend. During the summer Enersen was allowed to leave stord for a club in Rogaland. That club became IL Eiger, making his debut in August 1990.

Wrapping up his education in Stavanger, Enersen considered leaving Western Norway. In the fall of 1990 he took part in training sessions with Moss FK, whose manager Mike Speight had managed Enersen in FK Vidar.

Enersen and Moss agreed to a transfer deal. He resided at Jeløya for the time being.

As Enersen was a central part of the manager's plans in Moss in 1991, he was able to play in central defence and midfield. He was also chosen as captain. Enersen later complained about the same education mishap happening in Moss; he wanted to enrol in a local college in Østfold, but it transpired that he had to attend classes in Halden. He once again moved back to Stavanger. While the idea was for Enersen to remain in Moss throughout 1991, Johnny Melbye was assigned the captain role after Enersen moved. Moss wanted a captain who trained with the club on weekdays. In September 1991, Moss released Enersen as the club could no longer afford Enersen's weekly commute by airplane.

In September 1991, Enersen was announced as a new Bryne player, starting in 1992. His role as a journeyman had given him a bit of a frayed reputation, but the managing director of Bryne FK stated: "We have commissioned an assessment from Kjell Schou Andreassen, who thinks that we would be mad, had we not signed a contract with Svein Enersen if he wants to join Bryne". Moss demanded 135,000 kr for the player, with the Football Association setting the fee to 120,000 kr.

Enersen captained Bryne as well, but wanted to play in Norway's highest league, following his absence from the first tier since 1986. In the winter of 1993–94, there were talks about Enersen rejoining Viking, with some Viking players reportedly proposing the idea, but Viking's board did not want Enersen. Enersen instead returned to the highest tier for Kongsvinger IL, where he was seen as a direct replacement of Vidar Sanderud. The 1994 season started well, with Dagbladet proclaiming Enersen as "man of the match" on three occasions in April and May. Glåmdalen heled Enersen as the third best Kongsvinger player in 1994, and he played 21 out of 22 league games. Still, his stay in Kongsvinger was somewhat somewhat stunted by his residence and education situation–once again opting to move back to Stavanger as the month of August approached. Enersen stated that for 1995, his two options were a transfer to Viking or retiring altogether. In September 1994, he trained with Viking for a couple of weeks, trying to get a contract offer. Like the year before, Viking chose not to sign the player, citing that he would not "improve the team" and that his performance in Kongsvinger had been "up and down". In late September 1994 he was instead announced as playing assistant manager for Bryne, starting in 1995.

During the second spell in Bryne he also reprised his role as captain. Among others, he helped eliminate Viking from the 1995 Norwegian Football Cup. In October 1995, Enersen announced his wish to play for IK Start from 1996. He considered moving and settling in the Kristiansand region, as his girlfriend was originally from Søgne. Enersen also wanted to return to the Eliteserien.

The transfer went through, and Start's manager was delighted with Enersen's "tough" playing style and his heading abilities. Enersen was considered as a replacement of Claus Eftevaag in central defence. Start performed badly in 1996, and changed managers. As a curiosity, Enersen scored an own goal from 22 metres against Lillestrøm. Eventually, conflict arose. Enersen claimed that Start was in breach of contract, and contacted the players' union lawyer. According to Enersen, Start had committed to finding Enersen an entry-level position in the regional newspaper Fædrelandsvennen. The newspaper denied that such a deal existed. In December 1996, it was reported that Enersen cancelled his contract, and considered retiring from football. The severance of ties with Start was "definitive and final", Enersen said, though he was still under contract. Bryne agreed to take the player back for a transfer fee of 190,000 kr.

On 8 May 1997, as Bryne suffered a big loss at the hands of Byåsen, Enersen felt hampered by an ankle injury. He never returned on the field. After some time aawy from football, he was unceremoniously cut from Bryne's squad. Enersen retired after the failed 1997 season.

== Post-football career ==
In late 1997, after retiring from football, he was hired as a sports journalist in Rogalands Avis. He was later hired in the same capacity in Fædrelandsvennen, and finally settled in Søgne. After 13 years in Fædrelandsvennen, where he advanced to sports editor, Enersen was hired in Polaris Media/Schibsted in 2012. He worked as a coordinator of syndicated sports news, but already in the spring of 2012 he was headhunted as the new editor-in-chief of Mandal-based local newspaper Lindesnes Avis. Also, in the spring of 2010 he had briefly worked as a tourism coordinator in Setesdal, but regretted and gave notice to leave after one month.

In late 2013 he announced another job change, this time becoming communications adviser in Agder Police District. He also took a part-time position as player developer in Søgne FK.
