= Tekna (Norway) =

Norwegian trade union

Logo.

Tekna (short for Teknisk-naturvitenskapelig forening, English: Norwegian Society of Graduate Technical and Scientific Professionals) is a union for graduate technical and scientific professionals in Norway.

== History and profile ==
It was established in 1874 under the name Den Norske Ingeniør- og Arkitektforening ('the Norwegian Engineer and Architect Association'). In 1912 it was reorganized as Den Norske Ingeniørforening ('the Norwegian Engineer Association'). It was again renamed to Norske Sivilingeniørers Forening ('Certified Engineers' Association of Norway') in 1973, and to Tekna in 2004.

It has 117,500 members as of 2026. The headquarters are in Oslo. It publishes Teknisk Ukeblad together with NITO.

Tekna is a member of the Federation of Norwegian Professional Associations, Nording (the Scandinavian association of engineering organisations), and Nordic IN. Its president is Elisabet Line Haugsbø, succeeding Lars Olav Grøvik in 2023.
