= Takvam =

Takvam is a surname. Notable people with the surname include:

- Andreas Takvam (born 1993), Norwegian volleyball player
- Magnus Takvam (born 1952), Norwegian journalist
- Marie Takvam (1926–2008), Norwegian poet, novelist, writer of children's books, playwright, and actress
