= Blumenbar =

Small avantgarde publishing house in Germany

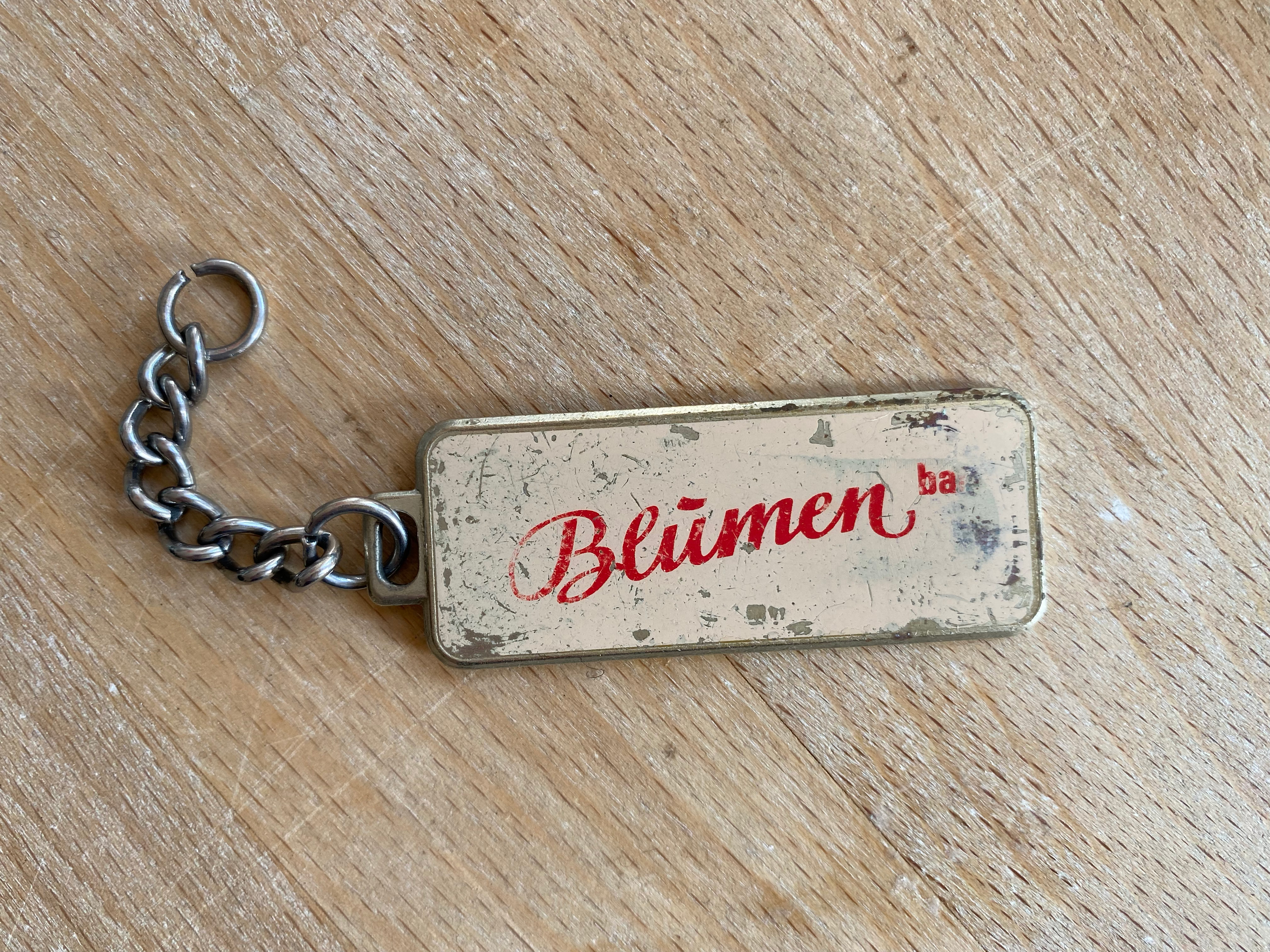
- Founded: 2002
- Founder: Lars Birken-Bertsch and Wolfgang Farkas
- Country of origin: Germany
- Headquarters location: Berlin
- Fiction genres: Avantgarde
- Official website: www.blumenbar.de

Blumenbar Verlag GmbH&Co KG is a small avantgarde publishing house in Germany. Blumenbar is German for "bar of flowers", alluding its beginnings in the Blumenstraße close to the Viktualienmarkt in Munich in 2002. The two founders, Lars Birken-Bertsch and Wolfgang Farkas, publish non-mainstream authors such as Matias Faldbakken or Tracey Emin. The graphic design of the books (by Chrish Klose) is especially noted. In 2009, Blumenbar moved to Berlin. Since March 2012, Blumenbar has continued as an imprint of the Berlin-based Aufbau-Verlag.

== History ==
Blumenbar emerged from the literary salon of the same name, which the two founders had been organizing since 1997 in their apartment at Blumenstrasse 3 in Munich and at changing locations. A decisive factor in the founding of the publishing house was the formation of the Blumenbar Club, a community interested in literature and culture. In 2002, members received a keychain with the publisher's logo upon payment of a minimum membership fee of 50 euros. The keychain entitled members to reduced admission to Blumenbar events. The money raised through the campaign helped finance the beginnings of the publishing house.

Blumenbar subsequently developed into one of the best-known and most influential labels in the recent publishing scene. From 2006, the publishing house was operated as a limited partnership. In 2008, a venture capitalist bought in. Blumenbar belonged to the group of independent publishers. The program, which focused on contemporary German-language and international literature, stood for a crossover of literature, art, pop culture, club culture and sociopolitical issues.

At the beginning of 2012, the Blumenbar brand was sold to Aufbau Verlagsgruppe. Publishing responsibility for the repositioned Blumenbar Verlag was assumed by Aufbau managing director René Strien until his departure. Today, publishing responsibility lies with Aufbau publishing director Gunnar Cynybulk, who brought Monika Zeiner and Bov Bjerg to the publishing house, among others.

At the end of October 2022, it was announced that Blumenbar publishing house founders Wolf Farkas and Lars Birken-Bertsch had sold the extensive publishing house archive from 1997 to 2012 to Monacensia (the City of Munich's literature and research archive).

== Authors ==
Among the authors in original german language are: Matthias Hirth, FX Karl, Olaf Kraemer, Tom Kummer, Hans-Peter Kunisch, PeterLicht, Thomas Palzer, Jasmin Ramadan, Walter Rufer, Alexander Schimmelbusch, Carmen Stephan, Alexander Wallasch, Raul Zelik and Anne Zielke.

International translated authors are: Paul Beatty, Zaza Burchuladze, Leonard Cohen, Erin Cosgrove, Tracey Emin, Matias Faldbakken, Sebastian Horsley, Leena Krohn, Alban Lefranc, Paulo Lins, Richard Milward, Murathan Mungan, Tony Parsons, Joseba Sarrionandía und Hunter S. Thompson.
