= Vågnes =

Vågnes is a Norwegian surname. Notable people with the surname include:

- Alfred Vågnes (1880–1970), Norwegian politician
- Øyvind Vågnes (1972–2025), Norwegian novelist, magazine editor, and researcher
- Reidar Vågnes (born 1950), Norwegian footballer
