= Melsom Prize =

Norwegian literary award

The Melsom Prize (Norwegian: 'Melsom-prisen') is a Norwegian literary award. It is given annually to a writer or translator who writes in Nynorsk, for a work published during the preceding year. The prize was established in 1922 by the shipowner Ferdinand Melsom. The prize sum was 40,000 Norwegian kroner in 2015.

== Recipients ==
The following have received the prize:

Year	Writer	Work
1924	Johs. Horvei; R.R. Hausback (pseudonym for Reinert Reinertsen)	Translation of Baroness Orczy: The Scarlet Pimpernel; Under lina
1925	Adolf Førsund; Hallvard Sandnes	Translation of Islandske småsoger Fjellkongen
1926	Lars Eskeland; Sven Moren	Bønder; Grøndalskongen
1927	Anders Hovden; Hans Reynolds	Attersyn; Grønland
1928– 1934	Not awarded	Not awarded
1935	Aslaug Vaa; Halvor Floden	Translation of Rudyard Kipling: The Jungle Book; Fagerlia
1936	Halldis Moren Vesaas; Åse Gruda Skard	Du får gjere det, du! Translation of Karl de Schwinitz: Slik blir vi til
1937	Knut Gjengedal; Ola Setrom	Den raude logen
1938	Lars Berg; Olav Gullvåg	Fire søsken går ut Det byrja ei jonsoknatt
1939	Andreas Haavoll	"for the publication of children's literature"
1940	Martinus Høgåsen	Mat for Mons
1941	Not awarded	Not awarded
1942	Inge Krokann; Ragnvald Vaage	Under himmelteiknet Av jord er du komen
1943– 1945	Not awarded	Not awarded
1946	Eirik Vandvik; Tarjei Vesaas	Far etter menneske The House in the Dark (Huset i mørkret)
1947	Gro Holm	Hjelpelaus
1948	Johan Hovstad	Rett og moral
1949	Alfred Hauge	Året har ingen vår
1950	Haakon Lie	Villmark og villdyr
1951	Bjarne Slapgard	Dagen du gav oss
1952	Tor Jonsson	Ei dagbok for mitt hjarte
1953	Jørgen Vikør	Gjennom framandt land
1954	Ivar Kleiva	Vågar
1955	Sjur Bygd	Draumen
1956	Åsta Holth	Kornet og freden
1957	Olav Berkaak	Det ædle malm
1958	Kyrre Benum; Arnold Dalen	Translation of J. L. Leithäuser: Mot ukjent land
1959	Harald Hammer (pseudonym for Helge Holager)	Translation of John L. Brom: Afrikansk Kon-Tiki
1960	Anders Hovden	Dikt i utval
1961	Olav Midttun	A.O. Vinje
1962	Bjørn Rongen	Slalåm for livet
1963	Hartvig Kiran	Tom Duley og andre viser
1964	Aslaug Høydal	Dyr last
1965	Arthur Klæbo	Over alle hav
1966	Ragnar Ulstein	Englandsfarten I
1967	Tore Ørjasæter	Den lange leid
1968	Knut Hauge	Dei løynde kjeldene
1969	Olav Rytter	Det tsjekkoslovakiske drama
1970	Arne Falk	Frifant-epistlar
1971	Arnljot Eggen	Baksideviser
1972	Johannes Heggland	Rusdøler
1973	Olav H. Hauge	Dikt i samling
1974	Jon Leirfall	Soga om Korvald Kyrre og den store hundestriden
1975	Halldis Moren Vesaas	I Midtbøs bakkar
1976	Alf A. Sæter	To i storm
1977	Arvid Hanssen	Randi til rors
1978	Pål Sundvor	Den mørke plogen
1979	Egil Lejon; Shanaz Saleem Baig	Bushra har to land
1980	Fredrik Heitkøtter	Frå Breheim til Mjøsstrand
1981	Kjartan Fløgstad	Fyr og Flamme
1982	Lillian Clausen Mangerøy	Berre eit menneskebarn
1983	Sigmund Skard	Mennesket Halvdan Koht
1984	Rune Belsvik	Sommarjubel
1985	Jan Rabben	Makkevika
1986	Audun Sjøstrand	Hundemordet
1987	Ingvar Moe	Rundt Sjøen
1988	Edvard Hoem	Ave Eva
1989	Arnljot Eggen	Det flyktige varige
1990	Ragnar Hovland	Sjølvmord i Skilpaddekafeen
1991	Hermann Starheimsæter	Han gjorde det
1992	Einar Økland	Når ikkje annna er sagt
1993	Sissel Solbjørg Bjugn	Tornekysset
1994	Bjørn Sortland; Lars Elling	Raudt, blått og litt gult
1995	Jon Hellesnes	På grensa. Om modernitet og ekstreme tilstandar
1996	Jon Fosse	Melancholy I (Melancholia I)
1997	Eldrid Lunden	Slik sett
1998	Marie Takvam	Dikt i samling
1999	Johannes Gjerdåker	Translation of Robert Burns: Dikt og songar, andre samling
2000	Ingar Sletten Kolloen; Jan Inge Sørbø	Berre kjærleik og død Over dype svelg
2001	Jon Fosse	Morning and Evening (Morgon og kveld)
2002	Brit Bildøen	Landfastlykke
2003	Sigrun Slapgard	Krigens penn
2004	Erling Indreeide	Utdrag frå Mistru den som ikkje er nostalgisk
2005	Knut Olav Åmås	Mitt liv var draum
2006	Edvard Hoem	Mors og fars historie
2007	Arvid Torgeir Lie	Innfor den myndige og umyndige beretninga
2008	Frode Grytten	Rom ved havet, rom i byen
2009	Stephen J. Walton	Skaff deg eit liv! Om biografi
2010	Maria Parr	Tonje Glimmerdal
2011	Lars Amund Vaage	Skuggen og dronninga
2012	Gunstein Bakke	Maud og Aud. Ein roman om trafikk
2013	Linda Eide	Oppdrag Mottro. Jakta på gamle dagar
2015	Siri Helle; Anna Kleiva	Handle rett Vårar seinare
