= Klæbo =

Klæbo is a Norwegian surname. Notable people with the surname include:

- Arthur Klæbo (1908–1985), Norwegian journalist
- Johannes Høsflot Klæbo (born 1996), Norwegian cross-country skier
