= Oddmund =

Oddmund is a given name. Notable people with the given name include:

- Oddmund Andersen (1915–1999), Norwegian footballer
- Oddmund Finnseth (born 1957), Norwegian jazz musician, composer and music teacher
- Oddmund Hagen (born 1950), Norwegian poet, novelist, children's writer and literary critic
- Oddmund Hammerstad (born 1942), Norwegian military officer, businessman and politician
- Oddmund Hoel (1910–1983), Norwegian politician
- Oddmund Jensen (1928–2011), Norwegian cross-country skier and coach
- Oddmund Myklebust (1915–1972), Norwegian politician
- Oddmund Raudberget (born 1932), Norwegian artist, painter, and sculptor
- Oddmund Vik (1858–1930), Norwegian politician
