= Linda Eide =

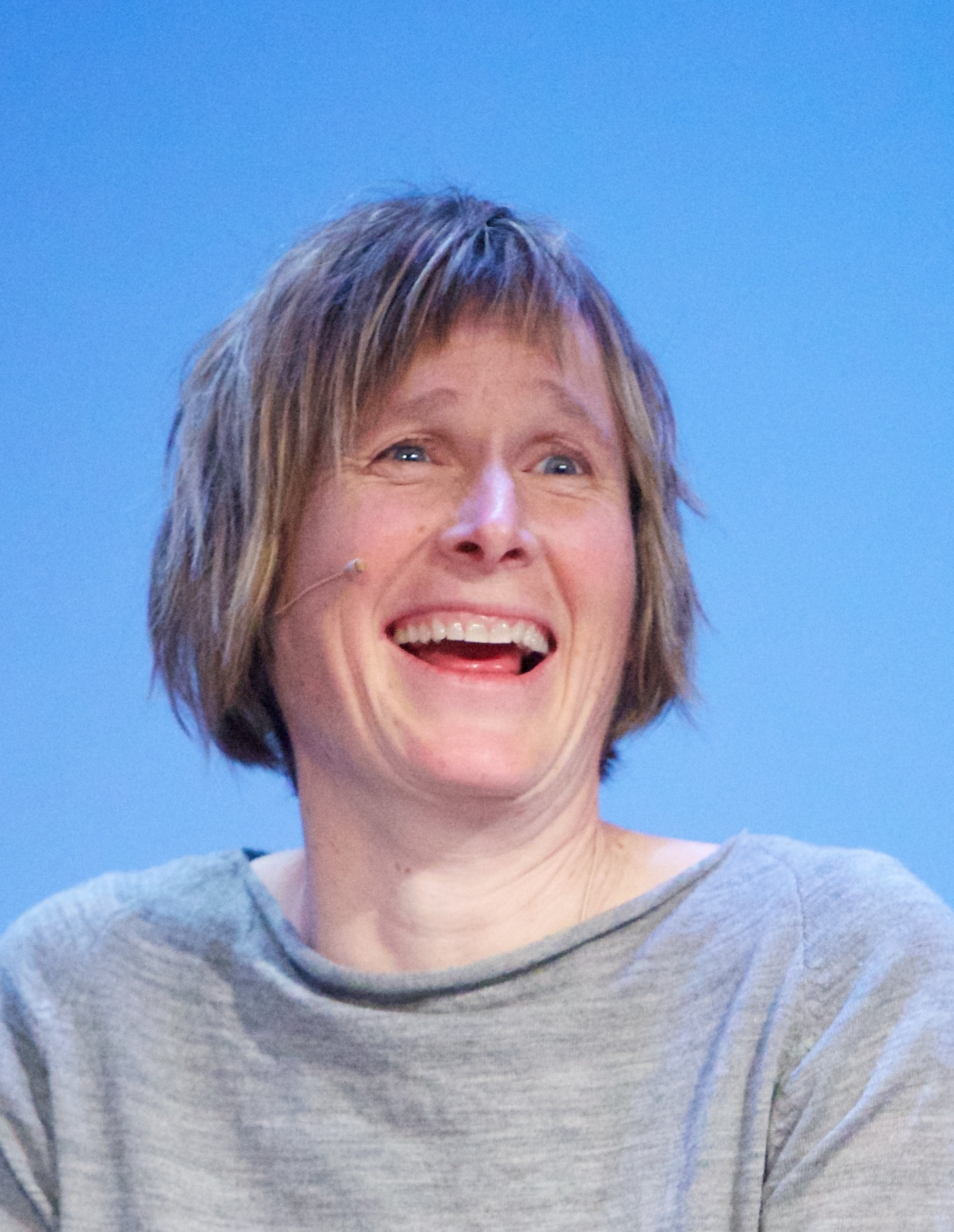

Linda Eide (born 10 February 1969) is a Norwegian television and radio presenter, programme producer, comedian, actor and chat-show host.

== Biography ==
Eide was born in Voss Municipality, a town in west Norway where the inhabitants speak a local dialect of Norwegian. Nynorsk is the official written form for many of the dialects in the west of Norway and Eide is a key advocate for the use and promotion of Nynorsk, one of the two official languages in Norway.

She attended Voss Secondary school and then graduated from the Norsk journalisthøgskole in Oslo in 1990. She studied literature in Trondheim University (NTNU) in conjunction with working for the new youth channel, at the time, on Norwegian television, NRK Petre.

She has worked for many years on the national NRK radio network but in recent years is best known for her television shows. In 2007 came Norsk attraksjon (Norwegian Attraction) where she travelled around Norway and introduced the Norwegian viewers to attractions that do not appear in tourist guidebooks.

In 2015, she presented Smæsj (Smash), a cultural-historic documentary series telling the history of various sports. This included travels and interviews in other countries including the USA, the UK and Germany.

In 2017 came Eides språksjov (Eide's language show) to the Norwegian television channel, NRK 1. This is an educational chat-show that researches and celebrates language use in daily life. Together with the show's own professor, pianist and special guests they dissect and analyse the use of language. In November 2019, the show was moved to the prime viewing time on Saturday night. The team comprises Linda Eide, professor Gunnstein Akselberg and pianist Sjur Hjeltnes.

In 2014, she set up the performance 200 years in 2 hours together with pianist and comedian Sjur Hjeltnes, a presentation of Norway's history. This performance was later shown on NRK1 television channel with the title Historical fun. The duo has performed a shortened version in various theatres around the country.

Eide has written numerous books, with her book Oppdrag Mottro (Mission Mother) winning the Melsom Prize for its wide readership and distribution. The book is based on a series of telephone interviews with her mother. Linda gathered stories of her mother's life spanning the 50s, 60s and 70s. In Autumn 2018, she presented her own performance and dramatization of the book in Det Vestenorske Teater in Bergen. The performance also showed in many theatres around Norway in the autumn of 2019 with more showings planned in 2020.

Since 2013, she has worked together with Akselberg and Hjeltnes on a monthly language show Ut med språket (Out with Language) in the Literature House in Bergen. She also gives lectures internally at NRK and at the university and Media centre in Bergen, on the subject of narrative for radio and television. Her ideas on engaging narrative presentations are presented in the lecture MEIRFIKSJON. This was first presented in Nordic Media Days in 2015.

== Awards and honours ==
- 2005, Gold Umbrella prize from the Bergen journalist society for Døden bak Styret (Death behind the handlebars), a documentary about the plight of cyclists in city traffic.
- 2008, the National Cyclists' Association gave her a prize for her long-standing commitment to the bicycle as a means of transportation.
- 2006, the Ministry of Culture gave her the Nynorsk prize for journalists.
- 2008, Dialect prize.
- 2012 and 2016, she was awarded the Gullruten award for best female programme leader.
- 2013, Melsom Prize

== Bibliography ==
- Eide, Linda (2000). Då gamlemor baka seg i hel: moderne skillingsdikt. [Oslo]: NRK P1. ISBN 8241902654
- 2003 – Kvardagstraume i utval (ISBN 9788252162110)
- 2004 – Radioradio: lyd i journalistikk (ISBN 9788252161618)
- 2009 – Norsk attraksjon: guiden til det du ikkje finn i guideboka (ISBN 9788281783089)
- 2012 – Oppdrag Mottro. Jakta på gamle dagar (ISBN 978-82-430-0708-6)
- 2012 – Norske Smakar https://www.tanum.no/_norske-smakar-hanne-frosta-linda-eide-9788241910555
- 2015 – Lydjournalistikk – innføring i radio og podkasting https://samlaget.no/collections/bestselgere/products/lydjournalistikk
