= Emmausprisen =

Norwegian Award

Emmausprisen is the name of a Norwegian literary award founded in 1998 by the Norsk Forleggersamband and Norsk Bokhandlersamband. It is given to books that "in an outstanding manner convey and confirm the Christian faith and Christian values." Past winners include Johannes Heggland, Peter Halldorf, Edvard Hoem, Max Lucado, Henri Nouwen, Janette Oke, Kirsten Sødal, and Lars Amund Vaage.
