= Liv Nysted =

Norwegian writer

Liv Nysted (27 August 1949 – 21 March 2010) was a Norwegian writer.

She was born in Alvdal Municipality, and made her debut in 1985 with Alltid disse bildene på nippet til å bli synlige. Later books include Samle på i morgen, vente til i går (1988), Som om noe noengang tar slutt (1990), Balladen om Ewi Halvorsen (1991), Ensomheten har syv huder (1992), Du var så vakker over meg (1995), Der husa står ute om vinteren (1998) and Metastase (2003) Liv Nysted had her language and literature exam from The University of Oslo, and from the Writer's School in Bø. She worked for many years as a teacher. In 1997 she received the Sigmund Skar-scholarship, and in 2000 she was granted a working scholarship for writers. In 1990 she was awarded the Nynorsk Literature Prize.

She died in March 2010.
