= Brit Bildøen =

Norwegian poet, novelist, essayist, children's writer and literary critic

- Born: 28 January 1962 (age 64); Ålesund, Norway
- Occupations: poet, novelist, essayist, children's writer and literary critic
- Awards: Nynorsk Literature Prize (1998, 2018); Melsom Prize; Amalie Skram Prize (2020); Dobloug Prize (2023)

Brit Bildøen (born 28 January 1962) is a Norwegian poet, novelist, essayist, children's writer and literary critic. Her awards include the Nynorsk Literature Prize, the Melsom Prize, the Amalie Skram Prize, and the Dobloug Prize.

== Background ==
Born in Ålesund on 28 January 1962, Bildøen grew up in Aukra Municipality. A librarian by education, she worked at the public library in Kvinnherad Municipality until 1989. She has also studied sociology, and attended the Skrivekunstakademiet in Hordaland in 1991.

== Literary career ==
She made her literary debut in 1991 with the poetry collection Bilde av menn. In her first novel, Eit anna eple (English: Another Apple) from 1992, the protagonist Eva sees her world collapsing, and not only the world but also her face, her body, her language and the time, dissolves. Bildøen's next poetry collection, På visse tider av døgnet, was published in 1994. In 1994 she also issued the picture book Peder og plystrelyden. Her second novel, Tur og orden (1995), consisting of 134 short chapters, deals with the protagonist Anna who experiences a series of bizarre events during a job travel.

The collection Det rosa er i oss (1996) is a translation of selected poetry by American poet Rita Dove into Norwegian language. She translated two children's books by Swedish writer Barbro Lindgren, Det vesle lokomotivet Rosa (1996), and Rosa flyttar til byen (1997), into Norwegian.

In 1998 she was awarded the Nynorsk Literature Prize, for the novel Tvillingfeber. This novel is regarded as her literary breakthrough, and treats issues such as separation, disappearance, and search of own identity. Her next novel, Landfastlykke (2001), portraits a modern woman who wants to accomplish everything, and treats issues like love and friendship. This novel earned her the Melsom Prize. In 2001 she also published the picture book Romhunden Odin.

The novels Alt som er (2004) and Mitt milde vesen (2006) are both family dramas. Adam Hiorths veg (2011) is an environmental novel, and Sju dagar i august (2014) was among the first fiction books to treat the 2011 Norway attacks. For her 2018 book Tre vegar til haveat she received her second Nynorsk Literature Prize.

She was awarded the Amalie Skram Prize in 2020. Her 2023 novel Gult farevarsel treats a family trapped at a remote mountain farm due to extreme weather conditions. In 2023 she was awarded the Dobloug Prize.
