= Lise Lindbæk =

Norwegian journalist (1905–1961)

- Born: 1 January 1905 Copenhagen, Denmark
- Died: 13 March 1961 (aged 56) Kiel, West Germany
- Spouse: Sanfrid Neander-Nilsson (1927–1933)
- Partner: Max Hodann (1934–1939)
- Children: Janka (b. 1929)

Lise Lindbæk (1 January 1905 – 13 March 1961) was a Norwegian freelance journalist and foreign correspondent, and writer of several books. She is commonly regarded as Norway's first female war correspondent.

== Personal life ==
Lise Lindbæk was born in Copenhagen, Denmark, to priest and journalist Johannes Peder Lindbæk and teacher and writer Sofie Aubert. She grew up in Copenhagen and later in Roskilde. After the death of her father, she moved with her mother to Kristiania, Norway in 1920. She married newspaper editor Sanfrid Neander-Nilsson in 1927, and their daughter Janka was born in 1929. Due to political disagreements (her husband sympathized with the Nazis), the marriage was dissolved in 1933, and Lise settled in Genoa as a single mother. From 1934 to 1939 she lived with physician Max Julius Carl Alexander Hodann, a former city physician (German: Stadtphysicus) in Berlin-Reinickendorf who had emigrated due to harassment from the Nazi regime. She was aunt to banker and businessman Jannik Lindbæk.

== Career ==
From 1924 Lindbæk worked as a foreign correspondent in Italy for Oslo newspapers, while she studied archaeology. She is generally considered the first female Norwegian war correspondent, covering the Spanish Civil War for the newspaper Dagbladet, even though Gerda Grepp arrived in Spain a few months before Lindbæk, covering the conflict for Arbeiderbladet. Author Sigrun Slapgard supports Lindbæk's status as Norway's first female war correspondent on the grounds that she covered Mussolini's road to power and the 1933 Reichstag fire. During Lindbæk's time in Spain, she wrote the story of the German/Scandinavian-speaking Thälmann Battalion of the International Brigades, Bataljon Thälmann being published in 1938. Amongst the people she cooperated with during the war were the writers Ernest Hemingway and Nordahl Grieg. After the nationalist victory in Spain, Lindbæk worked to improve the conditions of the Spanish refugee children in France. In the Second World War, she was in Paris during the German invasion in the summer of 1940, unable to return to Norway. She experienced a dramatic escape to Algeria and Morocco, where she spent half a year and learned about the situation of interned Scandinavian sailors in the French colonies in North Africa. She eventually reached the United States. In the U.S., she worked for the magazine Nordisk Tidende, lectured at universities, and edited the anthology Tusen norske skip (English: 'A Thousand Norwegian Ships') about the fate of the Norwegian sailors and their contributions to the war effort (issued in the US in 1943, and later also in Norway).

At the end of the war, Lindbæk returned to Norway, suffering from alcohol problems she had developed during her wartime work. She involved herself in the reconstruction work in Norway's northernmost county Finnmark, which had suffered almost complete destruction in the closing months of the war. She worked as a journalist for the United Nations from 1945 to 1949. Her UN experiences also resulted in the book FN; inntrykk og opplevelser fra Lake Success og Paris, which was published in 1949. In the 1950s, Lindbæk worked as a reporter in Germany, both in East and West Germany. She died in Kiel, Germany in 1961, committing suicide by drowning herself in the sea. Lise Lindbæk was buried in Roskilde, Denmark.

== Selected works ==
- Jødene vender hjem (1935, with Max Hodann)
- Bataljon Thälmann (1938)
- Tusen norske skip (first edition New York City 1943; anthology, editor)
- Spania og vi (1946)
- Brennende jord (1958)
