= Arne Falk =

Norwegian writer (1886–1973)

- Born: 15 September 1886; Herøy, Norway
- Died: 11 November 1973 (aged 87); Oslo, Norway
- Occupations: Journalist; Newspaper editor Magazine editor
- Awards: Melsom Prize (1970)

Arne Falk (15 September 1886 – 11 November 1973) was a Norwegian journalist and newspaper editor.

== Career ==
Falk was born on 15 September 1886 in Herøy Municipality, in the district of Helgeland, Norway. Working as a journalist in Den 17de Mai from 1913, Falk edited the newspaper Norsk Tidend from 1937 to 1946 and the magazine Journalisten from 1946 to 1962.

He was awarded the Melsom Prize in 1970. He was an honorary member of both the Oslo Union of Journalists, the Norwegian Union of Journalists and the Norwegian Press Association.
