= Kirstine Reffstrup =

Danish writer (born 1979)

Kirstine Reffstrup (born 1979) is a Danish writer. She is best known for her award-winning novels I, Unica (2016) and Iron Lung (2023). Iron Lung was translated into English by Hunter Simpson and published by Peirene Press. She has won the Stig Sæterbakken Memorial Prize 2023 (Norway) and the Statens Kunstfonds Legatutvalg 2016 (Denmark).

She was born in 1979 in Denmark. She attended Skrivekunstakademiet in Bergen. Both her first and second novels received praise from critics.
