= Matias Faldbakken =

Norwegian artist and writer

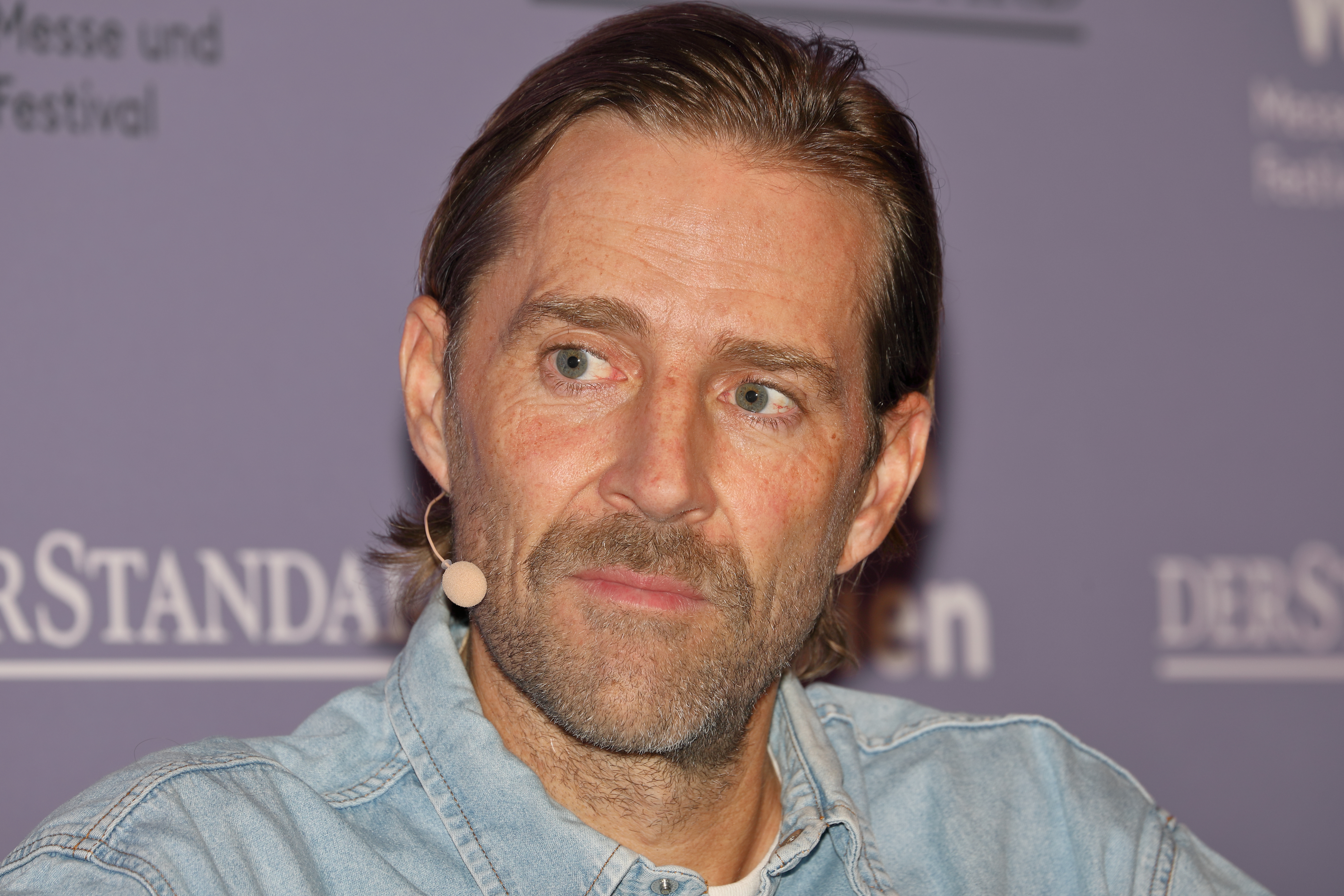
- Matias Faldbakken, 2025
- Born: 1973 (age 52–53); Hobro, Denmark
- Occupations: Author, artist
- Writing career
- Genres: pop cult, slash,
- Subjects: pop, youth culture, underground, slash
- Notable works: The Cocka Hola Company, Macht und Rebel, Unfun
- Website: www.salomonssonagency.se/matias-faldbakken

Matias Faldbakken (born 1973 in Hobro, Denmark) is a Norwegian artist and writer. Faldbakken studied at the National Academy of Fine Arts in Bergen and the Städelschule in Frankfurt am Main. He is the son of the author Knut Faldbakken and brother of film director Stefan Faldbakken. Matias Faldbakken is represented by Reena Spaulings Fine Art, New York.

== Literary career ==
Interview with Matias Faldbakken at Museum Boijmans Van Beuningen, 2012

He made his literary debut in 2001 with The Cocka Hola Company, the first part of his Scandinavian Misanthropy Trilogy. Macht und Rebel was released two years later, following most recently by Unfun, in Spring 2008, which completed his trilogy. All three novels are published under the pseudonym Abo Rasul and have not been translated into English.

In 2006, Faldbakken released Kaldt produkt ("Cold Product") under his own name. It is a contemporary update of A Doll's House by Henrik Ibsen. Faldbakken commented to Dagbladet when it was released: "I am a spokesperson for totally anarchistic mayhem on a bed of traditional family values". It was performed at Staatstheater Stuttgart in 2008.

He has also released a collection of short stories called Snort Stories.

His 2017 novel The Hills, translated into English by Alice Menzies in 2018 and published as The Waiter (Scout Press), received positive reviews, notably from New York Times food critic Pete Wells.

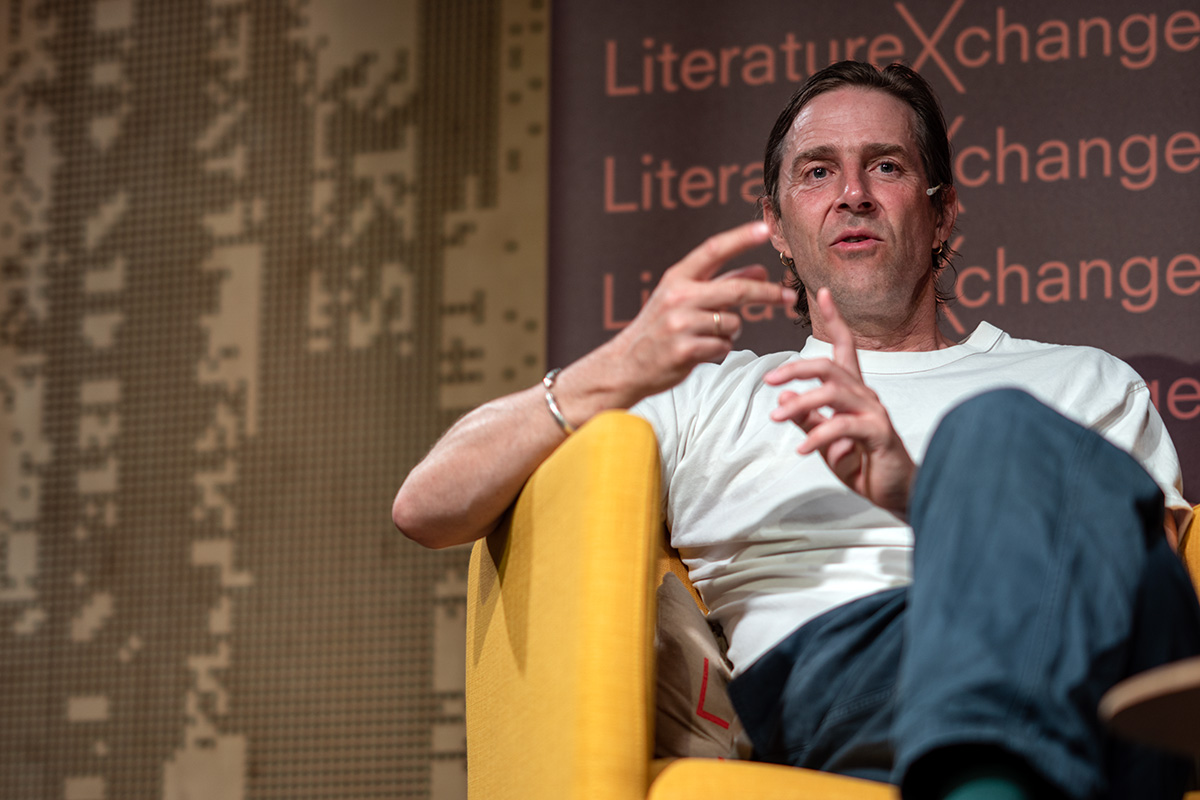
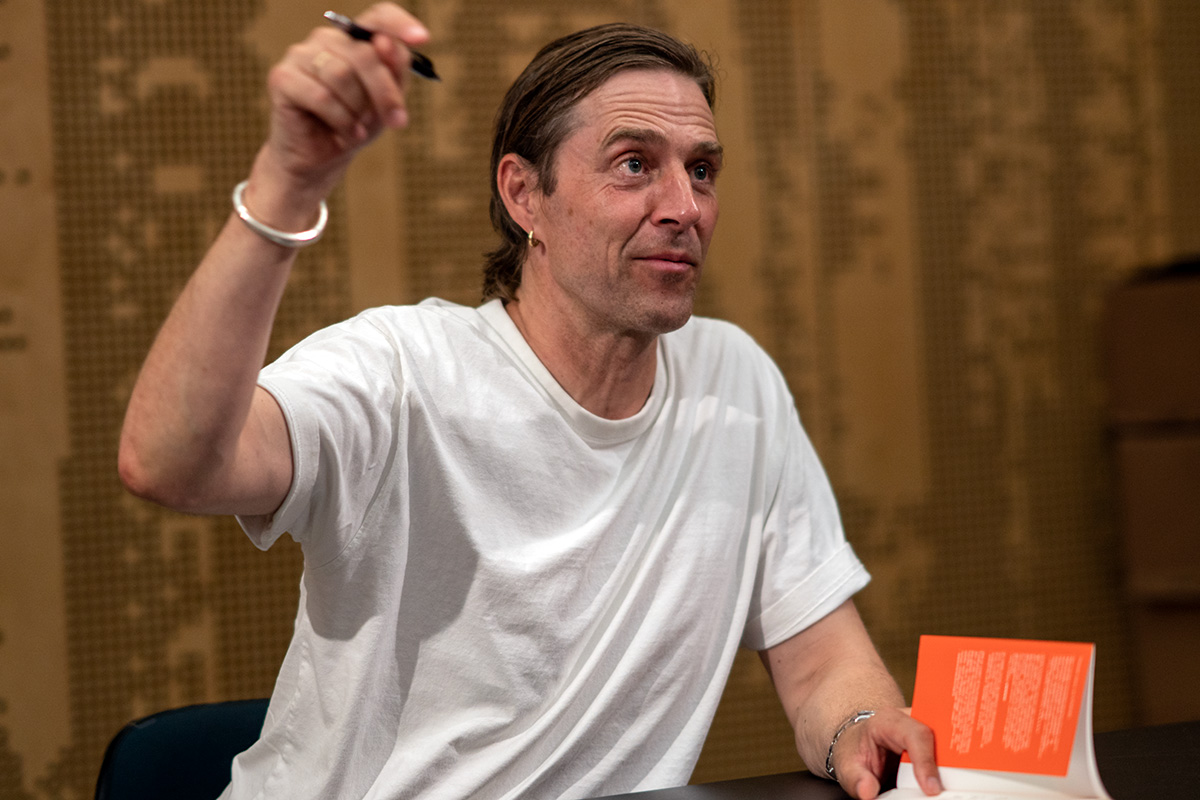
LiteratureXcange Festival
Aarhus 2026

== Art ==
In July 2026, the Upholding memorial by Faldbakken was unveiled in Oslo, Norway, commemorating the 2011 Norway attacks.

== Awards ==
Faldbakken received the Bjørnsonstipendet in 2002. He was awarded the Dobloug Prize in 2026.

== Affiliations ==
His publishers are Cappelen in Norway, Lindhardt og Ringhof in Denmark, Johnny Kniga in Finland, Blumenbar and Heyne in Germany, Mondadori in Italy, Suma in Spain, Limus in Russia, LWU in Lithuania, and Harvill in the UK.

Matias Faldbakken is represented by Paula Cooper Gallery in New York, Galerie Eva Presenhuber in Zurich and Vienna, Simon Lee Gallery in London, in Norway by Standard (Oslo) and in Berlin by Galerie Neu.

Awards
Preceded by Mona Høvring	Winner of the Norwegian Critics Prize for Literature; 2019	Succeeded by Karoline Brændjord
