= Peter Halldorf =

Swedish pastor (born 1958)

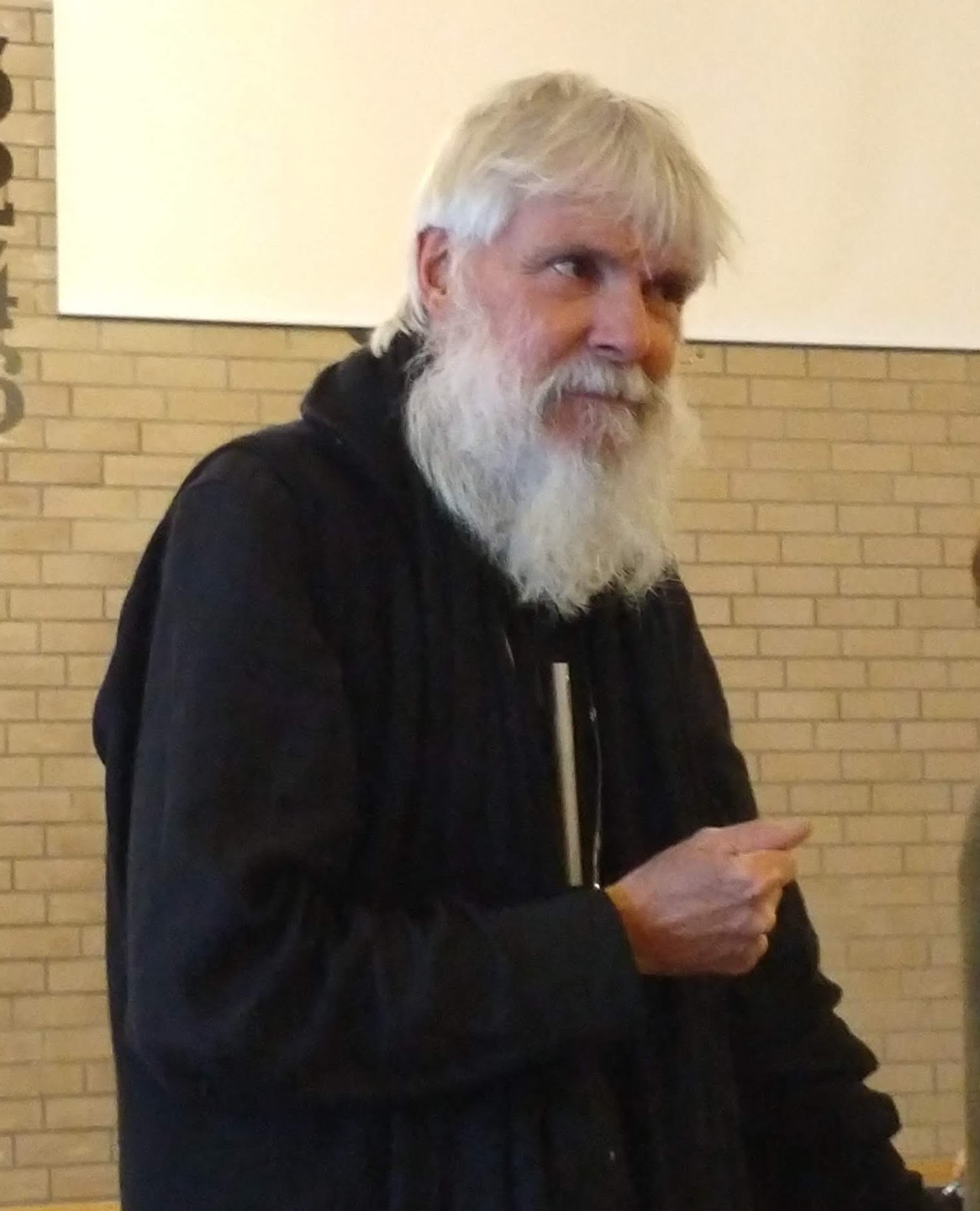
- Peter Halldorf leading Bible studies in October 2019
- Born: 21 June 1958; Norrköping's Östra Eneby parish
- Occupations: Pastor, editing staff, publisher

Peter Halldorf (born 21 June 1958) is a Swedish Pentecostal pastor, self-taught theologian, and writer. He is known for exploring Patristics, particularly the Desert Fathers, within a Pentecostal context. His interest has led him to be dubbed "The Pentecostal Monk" and sometimes prays in Coptic monasteries. He is a third-generation Pentecostal preacher who became interested in the Desert Fathers out of concerns Pentecostalism could fall into worldliness or shallowness. He also found an ultimate "gentleness" in much of the Desert Fathers' stories. Halldorf has both written about and been influenced by the Flodberg Circle, an early 20th-century Swedish circle of people interested in mysticism.

Halldorf is additionally a two-time winner of the Emmausprisen for Christian writing.
