= 80 Degrees East of Birdland =

- Directed by: Sølvi A. Lindseth
- Written by: Frode Grytten
- Starring: Daryl Barber; Fred Caruthels; David Malatesta; Charles Mena; Olav Niten Mannsåker
- Release date: 2000
- Country: Norway
- Languages: Norwegian, English

80 Degrees East of Birdland (Norwegian: 80 grader aust for Birdland) is a 2000 Norwegian short film directed by Sølvi A. Lindseth. It follows an American Jazz ensemble as they get stranded on a farm in rural Norway. The old man who lives there believes they have come to take him away to a retirement home.
