= Ola Setrom =

Norwegian writer

- Born: 1895; Oppdal Municipality, Norway
- Died: 1946 (aged 50–51)
- Occupations: Writer; Schoolteacher

Ola Setrom (1895–1946) was a Norwegian schoolteacher and writer.

Setrom was born in Oppdal Municipality. Among his books are the poetry collections Blåhøsongann from 1926 and Nordan under fjellom from 1935. The stories Medan steinane mel from 1937, Eit år sviv rundt from 1938, and Når tuftene ryk from 1939, treat conflicts between old and new in the rural society. He was awarded the Melsom Prize in 1937.
