= Karoline Brændjord =

Norwegian psychologist

Karoline Brændjord (born 1990) is a Norwegian poet.

Hailing from Sørum, she moved to Oslo and took two bachelor's degrees at the University of Oslo as well as the Skrivekunstakademiet course. She made her literary debut with Jeg vil våkne til verden in 2020, issued on Kolon forlag. For this book she received the Tarjei Vesaas' debutantpris and the Norwegian Critics Prize for Literature; becoming the first writer to win both awards for the same work.

Awards
Preceded by Hanna Stoltenberg	Winner of Tarjei Vesaas' debutantpris 2020	Succeeded by tbd
Preceded by Matias Faldbakken	Winner of the Norwegian Critics Prize for Literature; 2020	Succeeded by tbd
