= Max Hodann =

German sex educator (1894–1946)

Max Julius Carl Alexander Hodann (30 August 1894 – 17 December 1946) was a German physician, eugenicist, sex educator and Marxist, "the best-known and most controversial medical sex educationalist in the Weimar Republic". He wrote for a working-class readership (e.g. Guy and Gal, 1924) and for children (e.g. Where Children Come From, 1926). After 1933, as a refugee from Nazi Germany, he lived predominantly in Norway and Sweden.

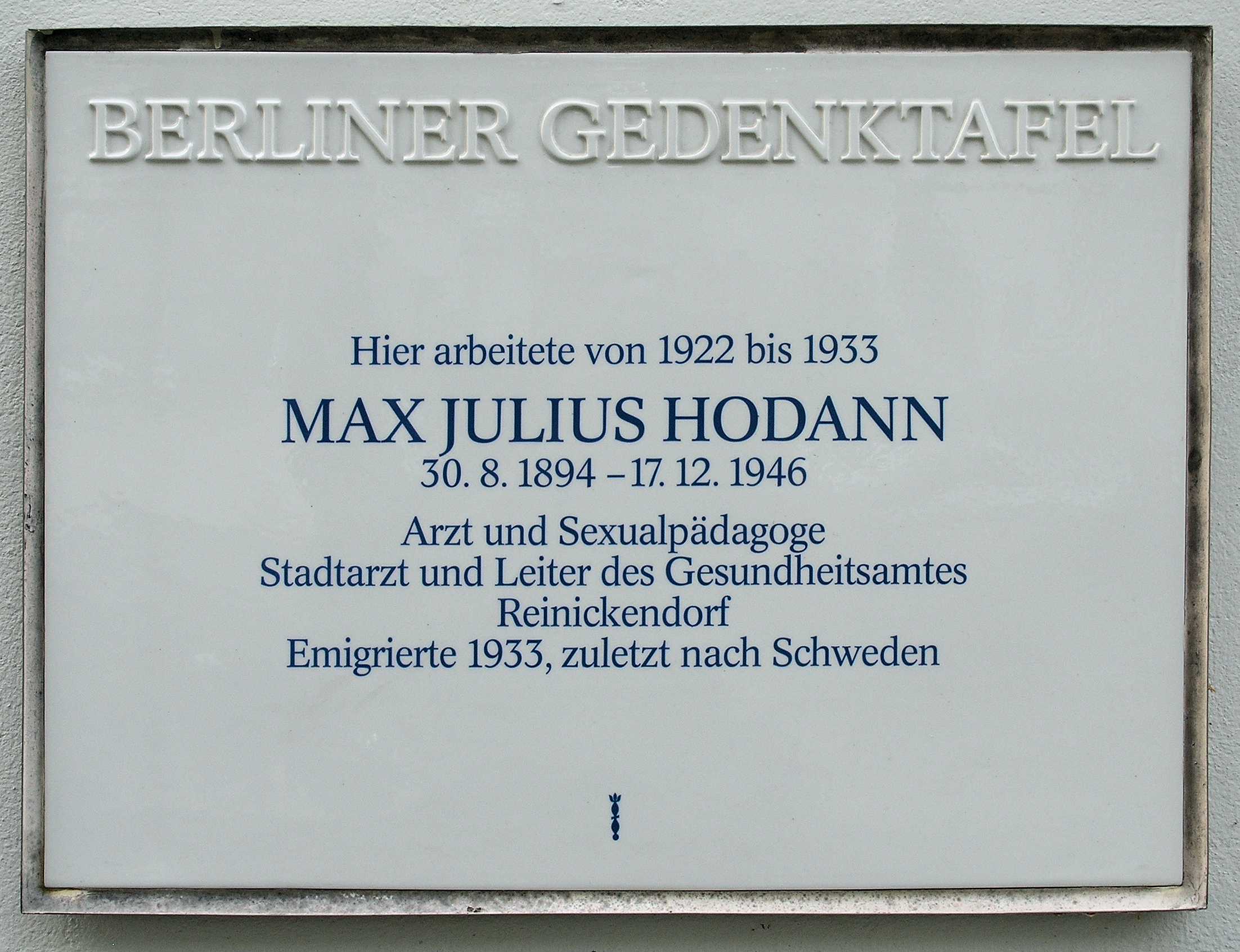
A plaque to Hodmann hanging at Reinickendorf 45, in Berlin

== Life ==
Max Hodann was born in Neisse, Upper Silesia, the son of a military doctor. After his father died in 1899, Hodann and his mother moved to Berlin, then to Meran in the Tyrol, and back to Berlin in 1904. He was educated at a Berlin gymnasium and took part in the German Youth Movement. He studied medicine at the University of Berlin, graduating (after interruption for army service in World War I) in 1919.

Hodann was a medical health officer in Reinickendorf, Berlin from 1922 to 1923. He worked at Magnus Hirschfeld's Institute for Sexual Science from 1926 to 1929 as head of sexual counseling and the "eugenic department for mother and child" He organized public question-and-answer sex education evenings, and wrote several sex education publications which were temporarily banned. He was a member of the Association of Socialist Physicians and the National League for Birth Control and Sexual Hygiene in Weimar Germany.

Hodann was arrested in February 1933, and detained without trial for several months. He crossed the border to Switzerland, staying briefly in France, the Netherlands and Denmark before living in England, where he was unsuccessful in efforts to set up an Institute. Moving to Norway, where he was financially supported by the Norwegian workers' organization Workers' Justice Fund (Arbeidernes justisfond), he published articles on family and sexuality in the Norwegian workers' press. After visiting Palestine in 1934, he co-authored a book with Lise Lindbæk about the Jewish return to Palestine. He worked as a military doctor in Spain during the Civil War from 1937 to 1938, returning to Norway and publishing a children's novel in Norwegian under the pseudonym Henry M. Dawes. Shortly before the German invasion of Norway in 1940, he moved to Sweden. There he published a novel worked with German military deserters, as well as with the Swedish Association for Sexuality Education (RFSU). He died from an asthma attack in Stockholm on 17 December 1946. There are papers at the Archives of the Swedish Municipal Workers' Union in Stockholm.

== Works ==
- (ed.) Die Jugend zum Sexualproblem (Young people and the sexual problem), Leipzig, 1916.
- (ed.) Schriften zur Jugendbewegung (Publications on the youth movement), Leipzig: Radelli & Hille, 1916.
- (ed. with Walther Koch) Die Urburschenschaft als Jugendbewegung; in zeitgenössischen Berichten zur Jahrhundertfeier des Wartburgfestes (The first student fraternity as a youth movement; in contemporary reports on the centenary of the Wartburg Festival), Jena: E. Diederichs, 1917
- Die sozialhygienische Bedeutung der Beratungsstellen für Geschlechtskranke: unter besonderer Berücksichtigung der Beratungsstelle der Landesversicherungsanstalt Berlin (The importance for social hygiene of counselling centres for venereal diseases: with special reference to the Advisory Board of the National Insurance Institute Berlin), Leipzig: Vogel, 1919. Doctoral dissertation, Friedrich-Wilhelms-Universität Berlin
- Deutsche Medizinische Wochenschrift, Vol. 45, No. 50 (1919), p. 1389
- 'Aus den Parlamenten' (From parliaments), Deutsche Medizinische Wochenschrift, Vol. 45, No. 51 (1919), p. 1423
- "Hygienische Maßnahmen in Sowjet-Rußland" (Hygiene measures in Soviet Russia), Deutsche Medizinische Wochenschrift, Vol. 45, No. 52 (1919), p. 1442-3
- Erziehungsarbeit und Klassenkampf (Educational work and class struggle), Jena, Thür. Verlagsanstalt und Druckerei
- Eltern und Kleinkinder-Hygiene (Eugenik) (Parents and toddler-hygiene (eugenics)), Leipzig: Oldenburg, 1923.
- Bub und Mädel. Gespräche unter Kameraden über die Geschlechterfrage (Guy and gal. Conversations among comrades on the gender question), Leipzig: Oldenburg, 1924. Foreword by Paul Oestreich.
  - Translated by Boris Osipovich Finkelʹshteĭn into Russian, 1925; translated into Ukrainian, 1925.
  - Translated into Swedish as Saker som man inte talar om (Things we don't talk about), Stockholm: Arbetarkultur, 1934.
- (ed. with Heinrich Müller) Der jugendliche Mensch und der Erzieher (The young man and the educator), Berlin, 1925.
- Woher die Kinden kommen: Ein Lehrbuch, für Kinder lesbar (Where babies come from: a textbook for children to read), Rudolstadt: Greifenverlag, 1926. Illustrated by Willi Geißler. New edition (1928) as Bringt uns wirklich der Klapperstorch? Ein Lehrbuch, für Kinder lesbar (Does the stork really bring us? A textbook for children to read)
- Geschlecht und Liebe in biologischer und gesellschaftlicher Beziehung (Sex and love in their biological and social relationship), Rudolstadt: Greifenverl., 1927.
  - Translated by Jerome Gibbs as Sex life in Europe: A biological and sociological survey, New York: The Gargoyle Press, 1932.
- Der Mensch, sein Körper und seine Lebenstätigkeit (Man: his body and his life activity), München: Birk, 1927.
- Sexualpädagogik: Erziehungshygiene und Gesundheitspolitik. Gesammelte Aufsätze u. Vortr. (1916–1927) (Sex education: hygiene education and health policies), Rudolstadt/Thür.: Greifenverl., 1928.
- Elternhygiene : Eugenik für Erzieher (Parental hygiene: eugenics for educators), Rudolstadt: Greifenverl., 1928.
- Von der Kunst des Liebesverkehrs, Rudolstadt i. Thür.: Greifenverl., 1928
- Die Sexualnot der Erwachsenen (The sexual frustration of adults), Rudolstadt: Greifenverl., 1928.
- Sexualelend und Sexualberatung (Sexual misery and sexual counselling), Thür. Rudolstadt, 1928
- Unzucht! Unzucht! Herr Staatsanwalt! zur Naturgeschichte des deutschen Schamgefühls (Fornication! Fornication! Mr. Prosecutor! The natural history of German shame), Rudolstadt: Greifenverlag, 1928
- Onanie: weder Laster noch Krankheit (Masturbation: neither wicked nor illness), Berlin: Universitas, 1929
- Sowjetunion: Gestern, Heute, Morgen (Soviet Union: yesterday, today, tomorrow), Berlin: Universitas, 1931
- Der slawische Gürtel um Deutschland; Polen, die Tschechoslowakei und die deutschen Ostprobleme (The Slavic girdle of Germany: Poland, Czechoslovakia and the problem of the German East), Berlin: Universitas, 1932
- (with Lise Lindbaek) Jødene vender hjem (Jews returning home), Oslo: Aschehoug, 1934.
- (ed.) The New Birth Control and Abortion Law in Iceland. (10 December 1934.) Reprinted from the Marriage Hygiene, etc., Bombay, 1936.
- Sex and Modern Morality. Reprinted from the "Marriage Hygiene," etc., Bombay, 1936. Translated by Stella Browne.
- History of modern morals, London, W. Heinemann ltd, 1937. Translated by Stella Browne from the unpublished German original.
- (as Henry M. Dawes) Jakob går over grensen, Oslo: Tiden Norsk Forlag, 1938.
