= Upholding =

Memorial mosaic in Norway

- En Oprettholdelse (Norwegian)
- Artist: Matias Faldbakken
- Completion date: July 19, 2026
- Medium: Mosaic; Steel
- Subject: 2011 Norway attacks
- Dimensions: 12 m × 15 m (39 ft × 49 ft)
- Location: Oslo, Norway; 59.9154°N 10.7448°E

Upholding (Norwegian: En Oprettholdelse) is an outdoor mosaic in Oslo to remember victims of the 2011 Norway attacks. The mosaic was created by artist Matias Faldbakken, and unveiled in July 2026 at the Norwegian Government Quarter in Oslo.

The artwork is 12 metres (39 ft) high, and supported by a steel frame painted blue; echoing the design of the support structure used to relocate The Fishermen by Pablo Picasso—one of Picasso's Regjeringskvartalet murals— following the 2011 bomb blast.

The memorial was unveiled on 19 July 2026, with Haakon, Crown Prince of Norway in attendance. The unveiling was held prior to the fifteen-year anniversary, to bring survivors and victims' families together in the city's renovated government district, near the site of the original bombing.

== Design ==
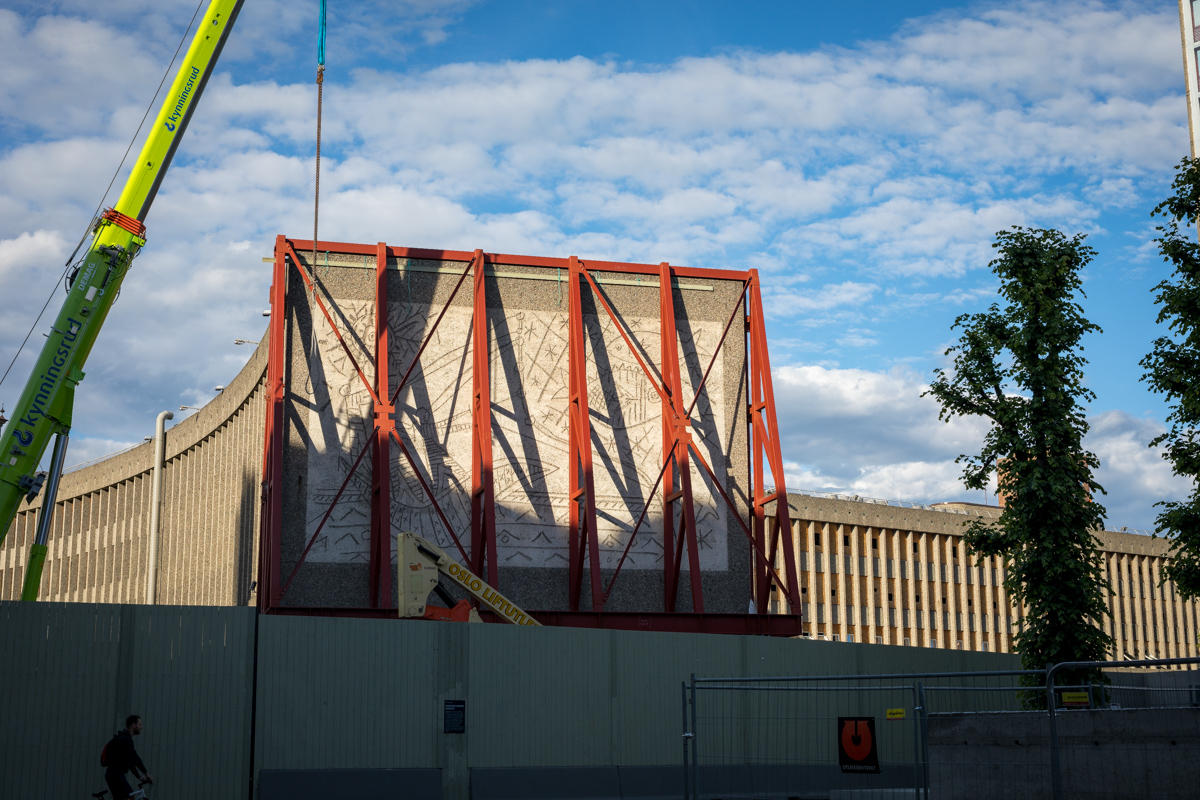
Steel frame around Picasso's The Fishermen, inspiration for the framing of Upholding

A three-year competition was held, with Faldbakken's design entitled En Oprettholdelse selected as the winner in early-2025. Following the competition, Faldbakken's miniature model for the design was placed on display at the Kunstnernes Hus in Norway.

The stone mosaic shows reed plants and a wader bird, on Norway's Tyrifjorden lake.
