= Inger Bråtveit =

Norwegian novelist and children's writer

- Born: 3 October 1978 (age 47); Bergen, Norway
- Occupations: Novelist; Children's writer

Inger Bråtveit (born 3 October 1978) is a Norwegian novelist and children's writer.

Bråtveit was born in Bergen, and grew up in Suldal Municipality. She made her literary debut in 2001 with the novel Munn mot ein frosen fjord. For this novel she was awarded the Nynorsk Literature Prize in 2002. Her second novel was Siss og Unn from 2008, where the central characters are taken from Tarjei Vesaas' novel The Ice Palace. The poetry collection Loveprosjekt from 2009 was a collaboration with the Swedish poet Cecilia Hansson. Her first children's book is Kven er snillast av mor og far? from 2012. She was awarded Bjørnsonstipendet in 2009, and Suldal Mållags Målpris in 2010.
