= Audun Sjøstrand =

Norwegian writer (born 1950)

- Born: 11 April 1950 (age 76); Radøy, Norway
- Education: University of Bergen
- Occupations: Crime fiction writer Journalist; Teacher
- Awards: Melsom Prize (1986); Riverton Prize (1991)

Audun Sjøstrand (born 11 April 1950) is a Norwegian journalist, teacher and crime fiction writer.

== Personal life and education ==
Sjøstrand was born in Radøy Municipality on 11 April 1950. He studied literary science, English language and Nordic literature at the University of Bergen, graduating in 1977.

== Career ==
Sjøstrand has been a journalist for the newspaper Gula Tidend, and taught in secondary schools. He made his literary debut in 1985 with the puzzle crime novel Hundemordet. With this book he introduced the subgenre rural crime fiction in Norway. Further novels are Ureint trav from 1987 and Valsekongens fall from 1991. He was awarded the Melsom Prize in 1986 (for Hundemordet), and the Riverton Prize in 1991 (for Valsekongens fall).
