= Solfrid Sivertsen =

Norwegian writer (born 1947)

- Born: 29 December 1947 (age 78); Mosterhamn, Bømlo, Norway
- Occupations: Librarian; Poet; Novelist; Children's writer
- Relatives: Kenneth Sivertsen (brother)

Solfrid Sivertsen (born 29 December 1947) is a Norwegian librarian, poet, novelist and children's writer.

== Personal life ==
Born in Mosterhamn on the island of Bømlo on 29 December 1947, Solfrid Sivertsen is a sister of musician Kenneth Sivertsen (1961–2006). Their parents were Gunnar Sivertsen and Bertha Elisabeth Svendsen.

== Literary career ==
She made her literary debut in 1986 with the short story collection Porselensfiguren. Her poetry collection Bortanfor mellomste rommet came in 1988. She was awarded the Nynorsk Literature Prize in 1994 for the novel Grøn koffert. Her novels also include Langtidsvarsel from 1996, and Eit plutseleg mørke from 2008.
