= Jan Roar Leikvoll =

Norwegian novelist (1974–2014)

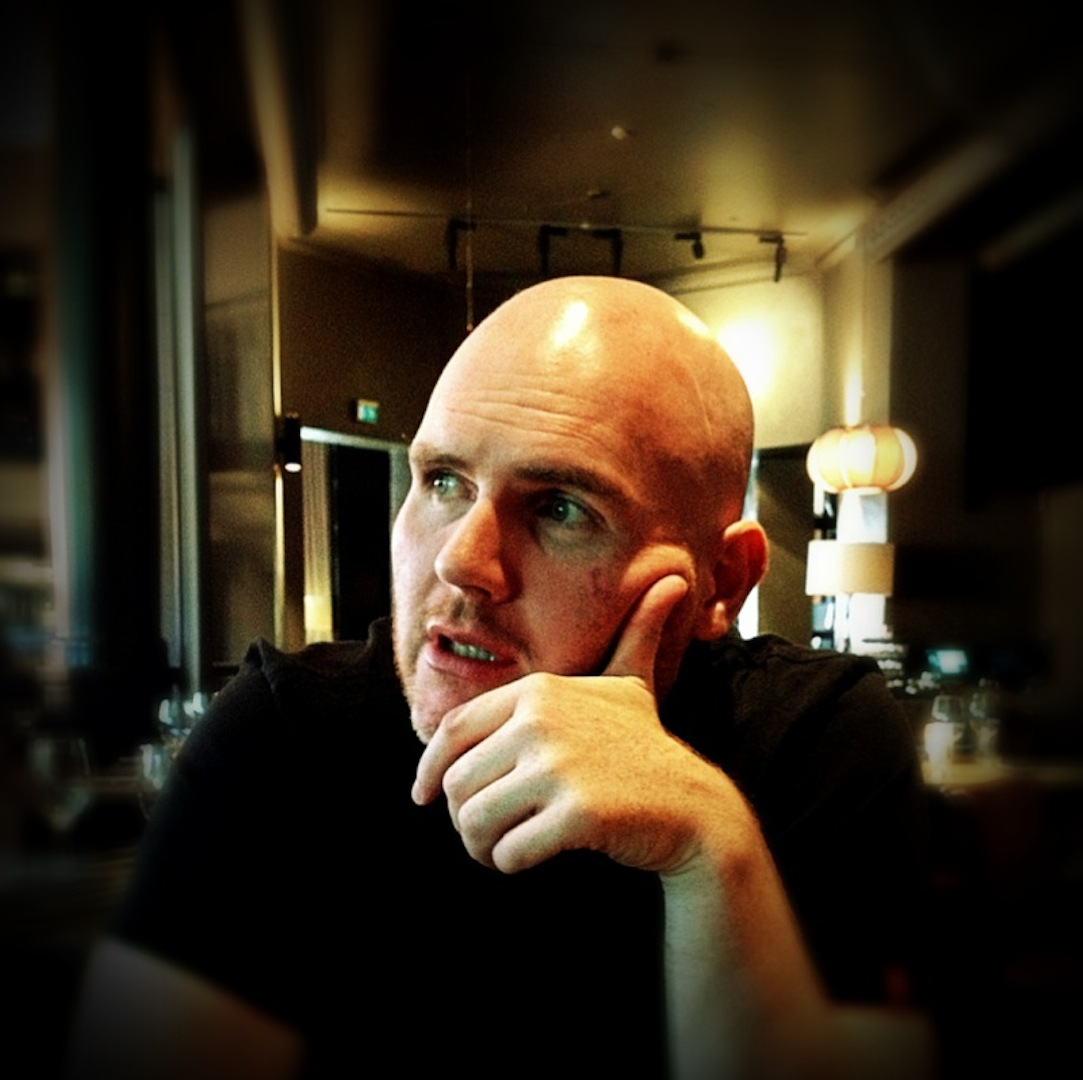
Jan Roar Leikvoll in 2013

Jan Roar Leikvoll (7 June 1974 – 1 August 2014) was a Norwegian novelist.

In 2002–2003 he studied creative writing at the Academy Skrivekunstakademiet at Bergen.

He published four novels: Eit vintereventyr ("A Winter Story", 2008), Fiolinane ("The Violins", 2010), Bovara (2012), and Songfuglen ("The Songbird", 2013), all on the publishing house Det Norske Samlaget.

He was awarded the Nynorsk Literature Prize for "The Violins" and Stig Sæterbakken's memorial prize for his three first novels. He was also awarded the Bokhandelens forfatterstipend in 2013, a grant for writers by the Norwegian Booksellers Association.

Leikvoll was open about living with a brain tumor a big part of his life. He died on 1 August 2014.
