= Aslaug Høydal =

Norwegian writer (1916–2007)

- Born: 22 December 1916; Seljord Municipality, Norway
- Died: 20 July 2007 (aged 90)
- Occupations: Schoolteacher; Novelist; Poet; Children's writer
- Awards: Melsom Prize (1964)

Aslaug Høydal (22 December 1916 – 20 July 2007) was a Norwegian schoolteacher, novelist, poet and children's writer.

She was born in Seljord Municipality. Among her novels are Dyr last from 1963, Tårer i sand from 1969, and Brest i såldet from 1973. Her children's books include Born og bøling from 1950, Bak berg og blåne from 1965, and Heile klassa i sving from 1970. Other works are the short story collection I skotlina from 1970, and the poetry collection Skjelv i vindovne skogar from 1986. She was awarded the Melsom Prize in 1964.
