= Frode Grytten =

Norwegian writer and journalist

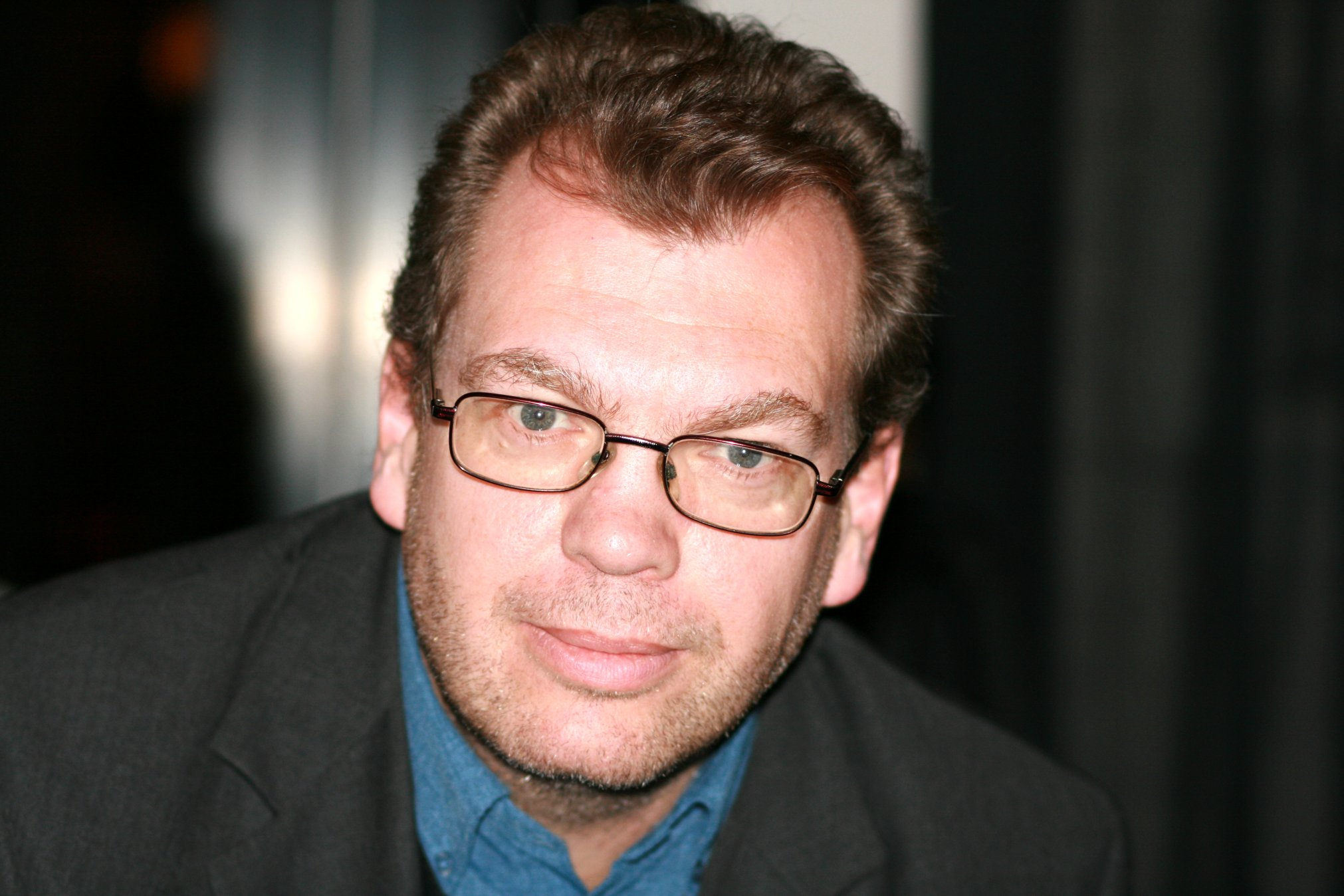
Frode Grytten, 2007.

Frode Grytten is a Norwegian writer and journalist. Born 11 December 1960 in Bergen and a native of Odda Municipality, he is the author of the Brage Prize-winning novels Bikubesong ("Song of the Beehive") and Den dagen Nils Vik døde ("The Day Nils Vik Died") as well as other short stories and poems. His works have been translated into Swedish, Danish, Finnish, German, Dutch, French, English, Albanian, Croatian, Macedonian and Chinese. He is one of three writers to win the Norwegian Brage Prize for adult fiction twice.

His journalism includes work for the local newspaper Bergens Tidende as well as the Oslo-based Dagbladet.

== Bibliography ==
- 1983 Start. Poems.
- 1986 Dans som en sommerfugl – stikk som en bie. Short stories
- 1990 Langdistansesvømmar. Short stories
- 1993 80 grader aust for Birdland. (80 Degrees East of Birdland) Short stories
- 1995 Meir enn regn. Short stories
- 1997 Heim att til 1990–åra. Short stories
- 1999 Bikubesong. Short stories.
- 1999 Frosken Vertigo og det store spranget. Children's book
- 2001 Popsongar. Short stories.
- 2002 Dublin. Non-fiction
- 2004 Hull & sønn. Children's book
- 2005 Bikubegang : 24 stopp i Frode Gryttens univers Non-fiction
- 2005 Flytande bjørn. Novel, winning the Norwegian Rivertonprisen crime award (published in English as The Shadow in the River, 2008)
- 2007 Rom ved havet, rom i byen. Short stories written to Edward Hopper's paintings
- 2009 Det norske huset
- 2010 50/50, collection of essays.
- 2011 Saganatt. Lundetrilogien, a trilogy of novels released together in one book.
- 2023 Den dagen Nils Vik døde ["the day that Nils Vik died"]

== Awards ==
- Brage Prize 1999, for Bikubesong
- Sigmund Skard-stipendet 2000
- Norsk språkpris 2003
- Rivertonprisen 2005, for Flytande bjørn
- Samlagsprisen 2006
- Nynorsk Literature Prize 2007, for Rom ved havet, rom i byen
- Melsom-prisen 2008, for Rom ved havet, rom i byen
- Brage Prize 2023, for Den dagen Nils Vik døde
