= Ruth Lillegraven =

Norwegian poet, novelist and children's writer

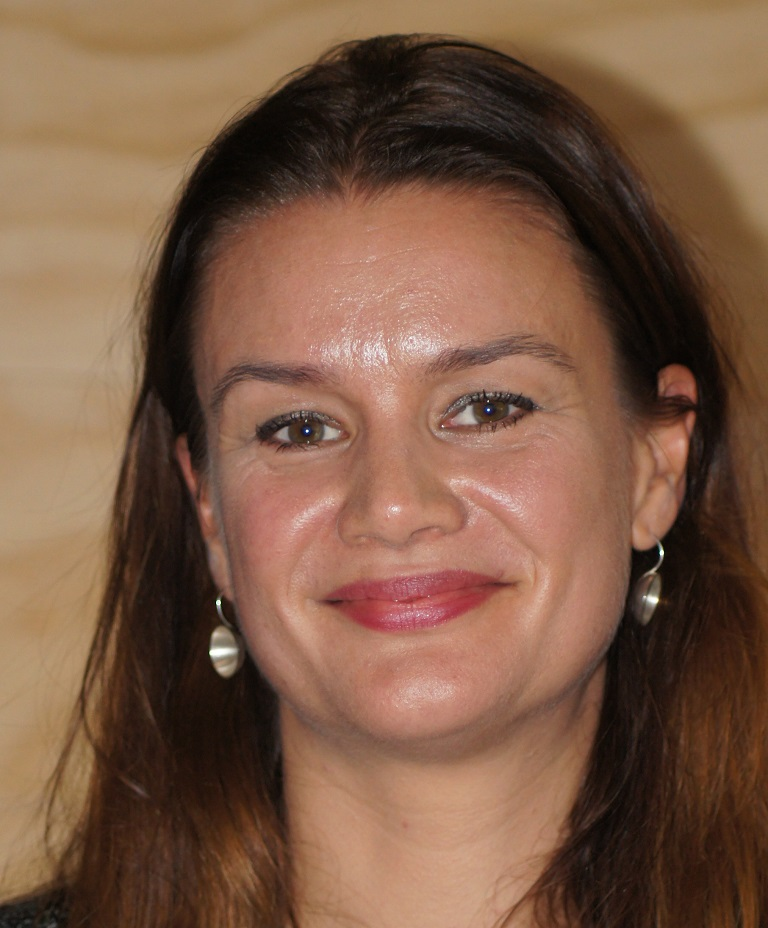
- Lillegraven in 2018
- Born: 21 October 1978 (age 47); Granvin Municipality, Norway
- Occupations: poet, novelist and children's writer
- Awards: Brage Prize (2013); Nynorsk Literature Prize (2016)

Ruth Lillegraven (born 21 October 1978) is a Norwegian poet, novelist and children's writer. Her awards include the Brage Prize and the Nynorsk Literature Prize.

== Personal life and early career ==
Born in Granvin Municipality on 21 October 1978, Lillegraven studied marketing at Norges Markedshøyskole. She worked for the publishing house Det Norske Samlaget from 2001 to 2007, and was appointed senior advisor in the Ministry of Transport from 2007 to 2015, writing speeches. Having written books since 2005, she became a full time writer from 2015. She resides in Bærum.

== Literary career ==
Lillegraven made her literary debut in 2005 with the poetry collection Store stygge dikt. Her novel Mellom oss was issued in 2011. She wrote the children's books Mari og Magnus flyttar inn (2011), Mari og Magnus og smokketjuven (2012), and Mari og Magnus får katt (2013).

In 2012 she was awarded the Sokneprest Alfred Andersson-Rysst fond. The jury listed five reasons for their decision. First, her poetry. Second, an insightful article about the poet Olav H. Hauge. Third, the novelist, and fourth, for her children's books. Fifth reason was to inspire her to write more. She was awarded the Brage Prize in 2013 for the poetry collection Urd. In 2014 she published the long poem Manilahallen, and another children's book, Mari og Magnus hos bestemor. She issued the poetry collection Atlanten in 2015. In 2016 she wrote a poetry collection for children and young adults, Eg er eg er eg er, and the poetry collection Disse dagene, dette livet. She was awarded the Nynorsk litteraturpris in 2016, for the poetry collection Sigd.

The psychological thriller Alt er mitt from 2018 pictures Clara Lofthus and her marriage. The sequel Av mitt blod came in 2021, and was shortlisted for the Sølvkniven prize at the Randaberg crime festival Blodig alvor i landsbyen.

She wrote the poetry collection Dette er andre dagar in 2020, and the children’s books Dei svarte svanene (2020), Hytta som forsvann (2020), and Fanga på fjorden (2021).
