= Olav Berkaak =

Norwegian novelist and teacher (1915–1980)

- Born: 6 November 1915; Rennebu Municipality
- Died: 5 January 1980 (aged 64)
- Occupation: Novelist

Olav Berkaak (6 November 1915 – 5 January 1980) was a Norwegian novelist and teacher at a folk high school.

Berkaak was born in Rennebu Municipality. Among his books are the novels Snø og eld from 1953, Det ædle malm from 1956, and November from 1958. The novel Riaren from 1973 treats a rural society in the 19th century. He was awarded the Melsom Prize in 1957.
