= Skrivekunstakademiet =

Creative writing college in Bergen, Norway

- Type: Private creative writing college
- Location: Bergen, Vestland, Norway
- Website: skrivekunst.no

Skrivekunstakademiet is a private creative writing college in Bergen, Vestland, Norway.

== Alumni ==
- Agnes Ravatn
- Brit Bildøen
- Erlend O. Nødtvedt
- Karl Ove Knausgård
- Karoline Brændjord
- Kirstine Reffstrup
