= Sigrun Slapgard =

Norwegian journalist and non-fiction writer

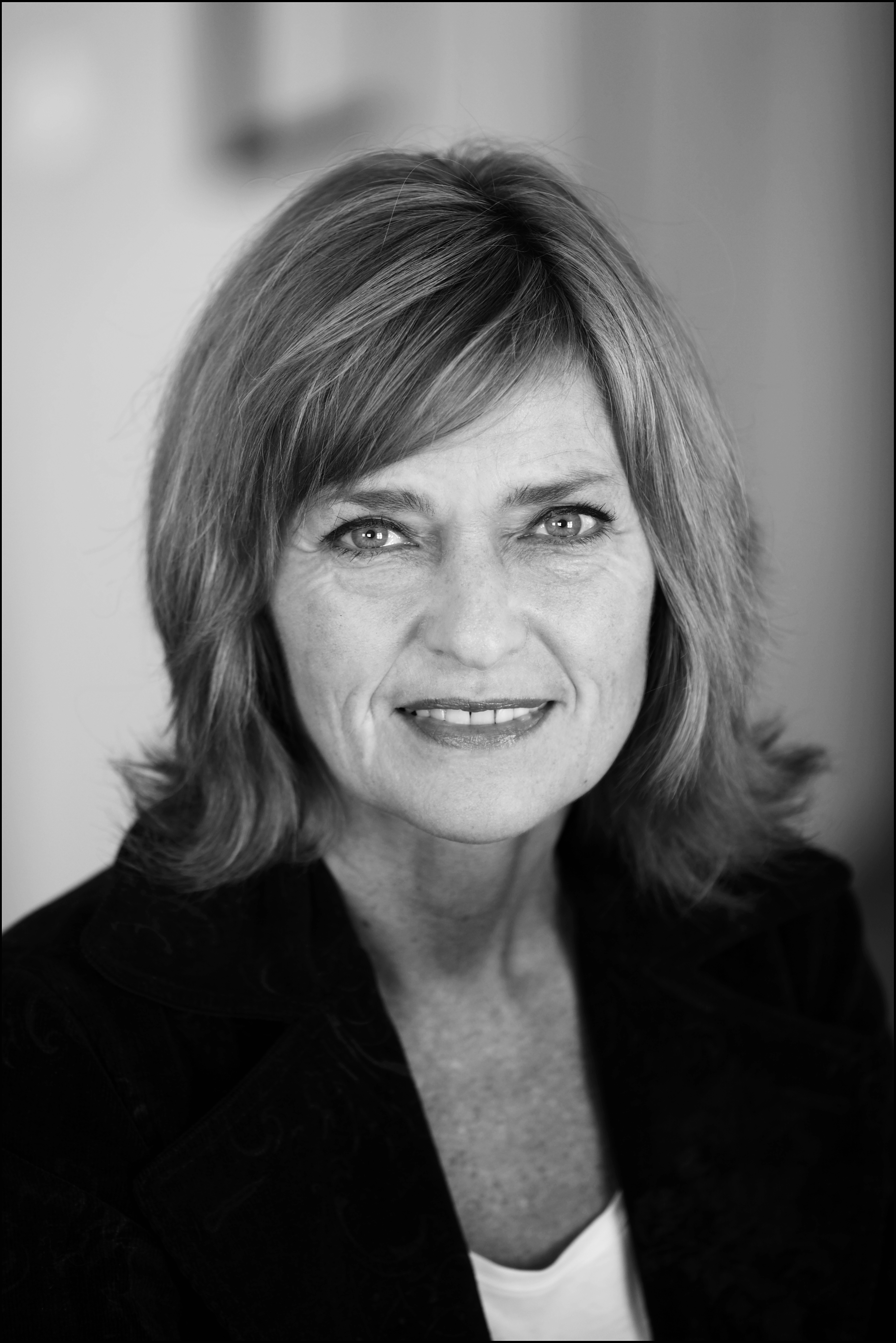
- Slapgard in 2011
- Born: 30 October 1953 (age 72); Hemsedal, Norway
- Education: University of Oslo
- Occupations: Non-fiction writer Journalist; Novelist
- Awards: Melsom Prize; Nynorsk Literature Prize

Sigrun Slapgard (born 20 October 1953) is a Norwegian journalist, novelist and non-fiction writer. She worked as journalist for the Norwegian Broadcasting Corporation, and has written novels and biographies of Lise Lindbæk, Sigrid Undset and Werna Gerhardsen. Her awards include the Melsom Prize and the Nynorsk Literature Prize.

== Career ==
Slapgard was born in Hemsedal, and graduated as cand.mag. from the University of Oslo in 1980.

She worked as journalist for NRK from 1988, where she presented programs such as the actuality magazine Redaksjon 21, the foreign affairs television magazine Utenriksmagasinet, and its sequel Urix. Her 2002 book Krigens penn, a biography on war reporter Lise Lindbæk, earned her the Melsom Prize. In 2003 she wrote the book Krig og løgn, discussing media ethics and the Iraq War. She wrote a biography on novelist and Nobel laureate in Literature Sigrid Undset in 2007.

She wrote the novel Paradishagen in 2011. In 2013 she was awarded the Nynorsk Literature Prize, for the novel Englestien. This was an independent contiuation of the previous Paradishagen, and largely based on her own experiences. Further books are the novel Maleren from 2015, and the non-fiction books Eg har sett jaguaren: latinamerikanske historier (2018), and Eit hemmeleg liv: spesialagent og spaniafrivillig (2020).

In 2024 she wrote a biography of Werna Gerhardsen, titled Werna Gerhardsen – jenta fra Løkka.
