= Flodberg Circle =

Swedish Christian group

The Flodberg Circle (Swedish: Flodbergskretsen) was a Swedish Christian ecumenical circle of friends with an interest in mysticism in Stockholm around the turn of the 20th century and for the next 30 years.

== History ==
The circle gathered around lantern lighter Carl Flodberg (1848–1933) and customs officer Henrik Schager (1870–1934). Schager had previously been part of the Swedish Holiness Union's conference and mission school. The group met in a small room at Köpmangatan 10 in Gamla Stan, Stockholm, where they engaged in spiritual and social activities. Those who met were a mixed group of people from even the lowest social classes. Here they differ from Carl Henrik Bergman's mystical circle, known as the Bergman Circle, which it otherwise closely resembles. The Bergman Circle consisted mostly of priests and people from higher social classes, while the Flodberg Circle had a greater social breadth. Schager was, however, in contact with Bergman's circle of friends. From there, the Flodberg Circle was supplied with Christian mystical writings in new translations and editions that had not previously appeared in Swedish.

The circle's mystical interest centered on the Holiness movement, Quietism and Radical Pietism.

The Flodberg Circle's most famous figure was David Petander, about whom at least seven books have been written and who has been called a "Swedish Francis". Many in the Flodberg Circle saw themselves as his disciples. Two of these have also become famous in Swedish church history, Nils Peter Wetterlund (1852–1928) and Hjalmar Ekström (1885–1962). Ekström came into contact with the circle in 1922. In 1924 and 1926, Ekström and Schager jointly published the journal Det fördolda livet ('The Hidden Life'), which included translations of writings by Christian mystics as well as their own articles. Ekström also became the pastor for many of the friends of the Flodberg Circle.

Women played a crucial role in the Flodberg Circle, such as Stina Svensk, Emilia Ullstard, Elsa Nilsson, Fanny von Otter and hymnwriter Linnea Hofgren, all of whom were called mothers in Christ.

One of the members of the Flodberg Circle, Ulrika Ljungman (1906–2002), wrote a small book about the circle, Gud – och intet mer. Levnadsteckningar och brev från den mystika flodbergskretsen (Artos 1984). Swedish Pentecostal pastor Peter Halldorf has also written about it in his 1997 book Hädanefter blir vägen väglös (Trots Allt/Pilgrim), and has been strongly influenced by the group's spirituality.

Hjalmar Ekström's book collection was donated to the Sigtuna Foundation, where it is now available to the public. This collection gives insight into what was read in the circle. It includes a range of books from old Catholic mystics such as Madame Guyon, François Fénelon, Thomas à Kempis and Franz Xaver von Baader to Lutheran mystics such as Jakob Böhme, Carl Olof Rosenius, Søren Kierkegaard and Waldemar Rudin.

== Influence ==
The Flodberg Circle has had a great influence on Nordic church life. For example, the founder of Brunstad Christian Church, Johan Oscar Smith, visited the Flodberg Circle in the early 1930s and took away significant influences from them.

Others from more recent times who have been influenced by the circle are Bible teacher Poul Madsen and bishop Martin Lönnebo. The latter wrote both about Hjalmar Ekström (Religionens fem språk, 1975) and about Henrik Schager (En annan väg än den där mange gå, 1987).
