= Knut Gjengedal =

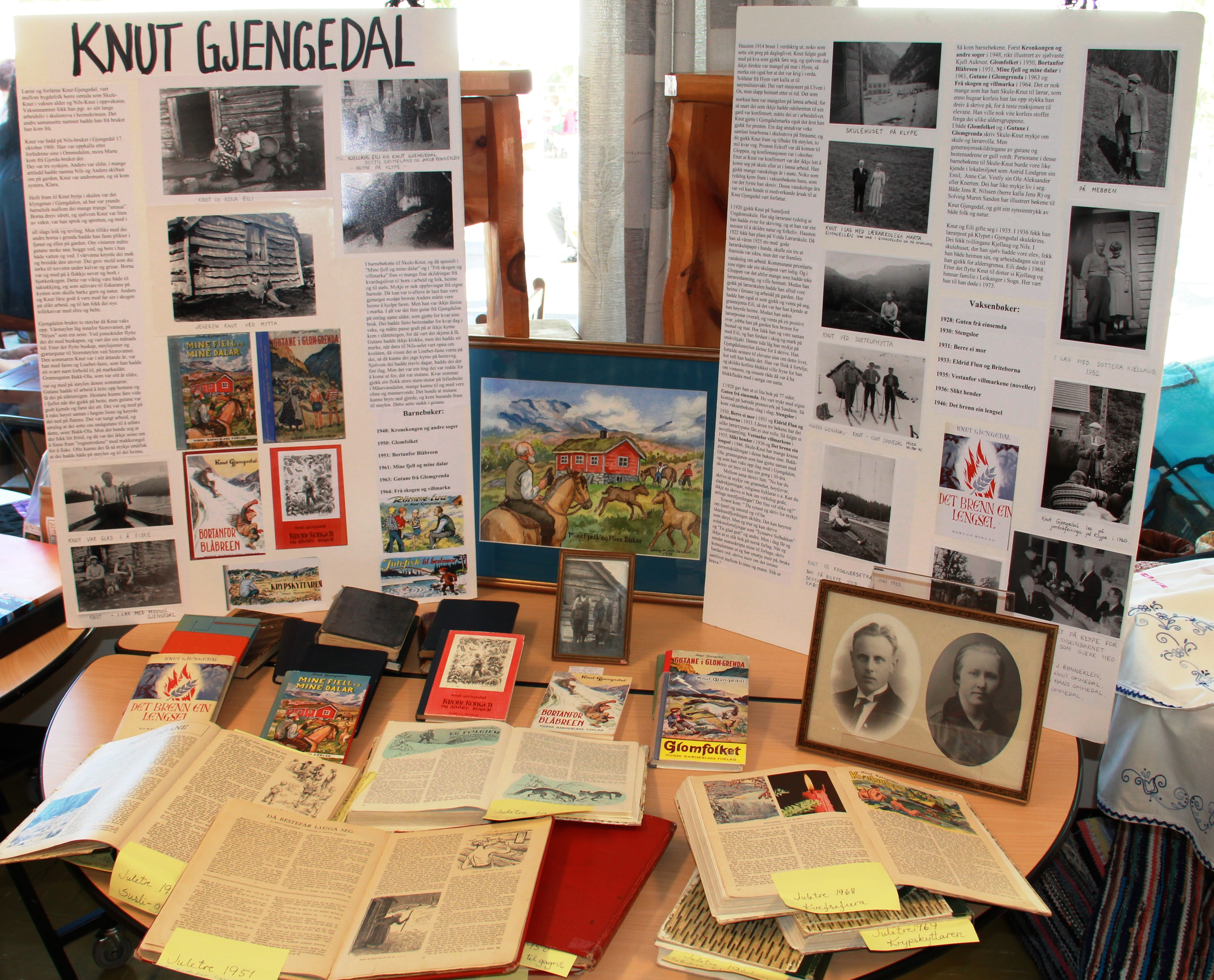
- Display of works by Gjengedal
- Born: 17 October 1900; Gloppen, Norway
- Died: 14 February 1973 (aged 72)
- Occupations: Schoolteacher; Novelist; Children's writer

Knut Gjengedal (17 October 1900– 14 February 1973) was a Norwegian schoolteacher, novelist, short story writer and children's writer.

== Biography ==
Gjengedal was born in Gloppen Municipality. He attended Sunnfjord Folkehøgskole 1919-20 and Volda lærerskole 1922–25. He received his first teaching post at Gimsøysand in Lofoten in 1933 and in 1936 got a post in his hometown.

Among his books are the novel Stengslor from 1930 and the short story collections Vestanfrå villmarkene (1935) and Slikt hender (1936). He was awarded the Melsom Prize in 1937. His children's books include Kronekongen from 1948, Bortanfor Blåbreen from 1951, Glomfolket from 1950, and Gutane frå Glom-grenda from 1963.

He married in 1935 to Eli M. Gjengedal. He was the grandfather of author Eli Kari Gjengedal (born 1971).
