= Nynorsk Literature Prize =

Annual Norwegian prize

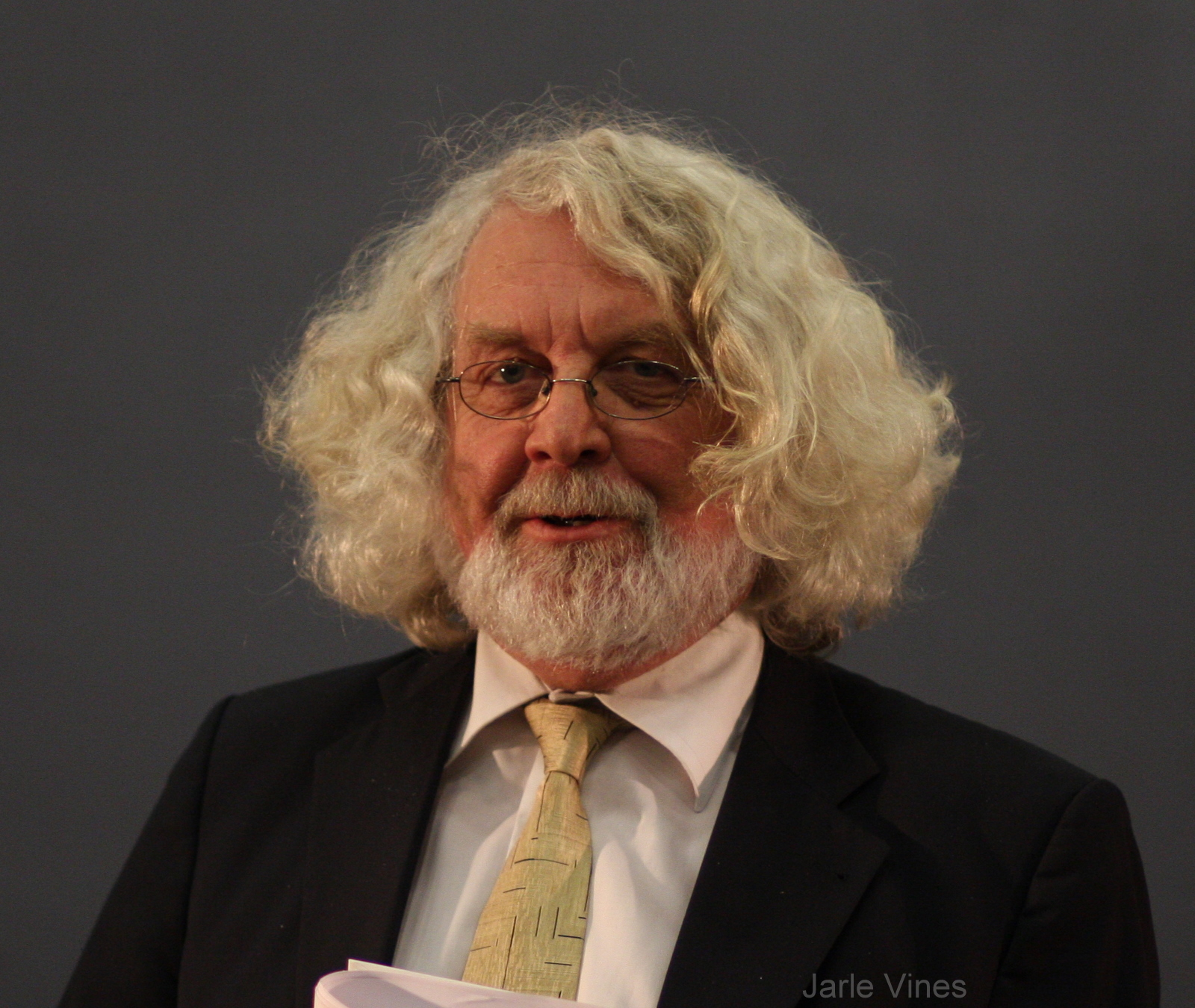
Edvard Hoem

The Nynorsk Literature Prize is awarded annually by Noregs Mållag, Det Norske Teatret and Det Norske Samlaget for the best book in either Nynorsk or dialect. The award is presented for the best novel, poetry, novellas, or drama in the past year.

== Winners ==
List of winners.

- 1982 – Eldrid Lunden, Gjenkjennelsen
- 1983 – Kjartan Fløgstad, U3
- 1984 – Alfred Hauge, Serafen
- 1985 – Paal-Helge Haugen, Det overvintra lyset
- 1986 – Kjartan Fløgstad, Det 7. klima
- 1987 – Edvard Hoem, Ave Eva
- 1988 – Johannes Heggland, Meisterens søner
- 1989 – Helge Torvund, Den monotone triumf
- 1990 – Liv Nysted, Som om noe noengang tar slutt
- 1991 – Marit Tusvik, Ishuset
- 1992 – Jon Fosse, Bly og vatn
- 1993 – Einar Økland, Istaden for roman og humor
- 1994 – Solfrid Sivertsen, Grøn koffert
- 1995 – Lars Amund Vaage, Rubato
- 1996 – Oddmund Hagen, Utmark
- 1997 – Marie Takvam, Dikt i samling
- 1998 – Brit Bildøen, Tvillingfeber
- 1999 – Åse Marie Nesse, Dikt i samling (1999), Faust (1993, 1999) and Mitt hjarte slo (1999)
- 2000 – Rune Belsvik, Ein naken gut
- 2001 – Ragnar Hovland, Ei vinterreise
- 2002 – Inger Bråtveit, Munn mot ein frosen fjord
- 2003 – Jon Fosse, Auge i vind
- 2004 – not awarded
- 2005 – Øyvind Vågnes, Ekko
- 2006 – Eilev Groven Myhren for Ringdrotten, a translation of The Lord of the Rings
- 2007 – Frode Grytten for Rom ved havet, rom i byen, novella
- 2008 – Gunnhild Øyehaug for Vente, blinke, novel
- 2009 – Kjartan Fløgstad for Grense Jakobselv, novel
- 2010 – Jan Roar Leikvoll for Fiolinane, novel
- 2011 – Marit Eikemo for Samtale ventar, novel
- 2012 – Lars Amund Vaage for Syngja, novel
- 2013 – Sigrun Slapgard for Englestien, novel
- 2014 – Lars Petter Sveen for Guds barn, novel
- 2015 – Eirik Ingebrigtsen for Spikrar frå fallande plankar, novel
- 2016 – Ruth Lillegraven for Sigd, poems
- 2017 – Olaug Nilssen for Tung tids tale, novel
- 2018 – Brit Bildøen for Tre vegar til havet, novel
