= Magnus Takvam =

Norwegian journalist

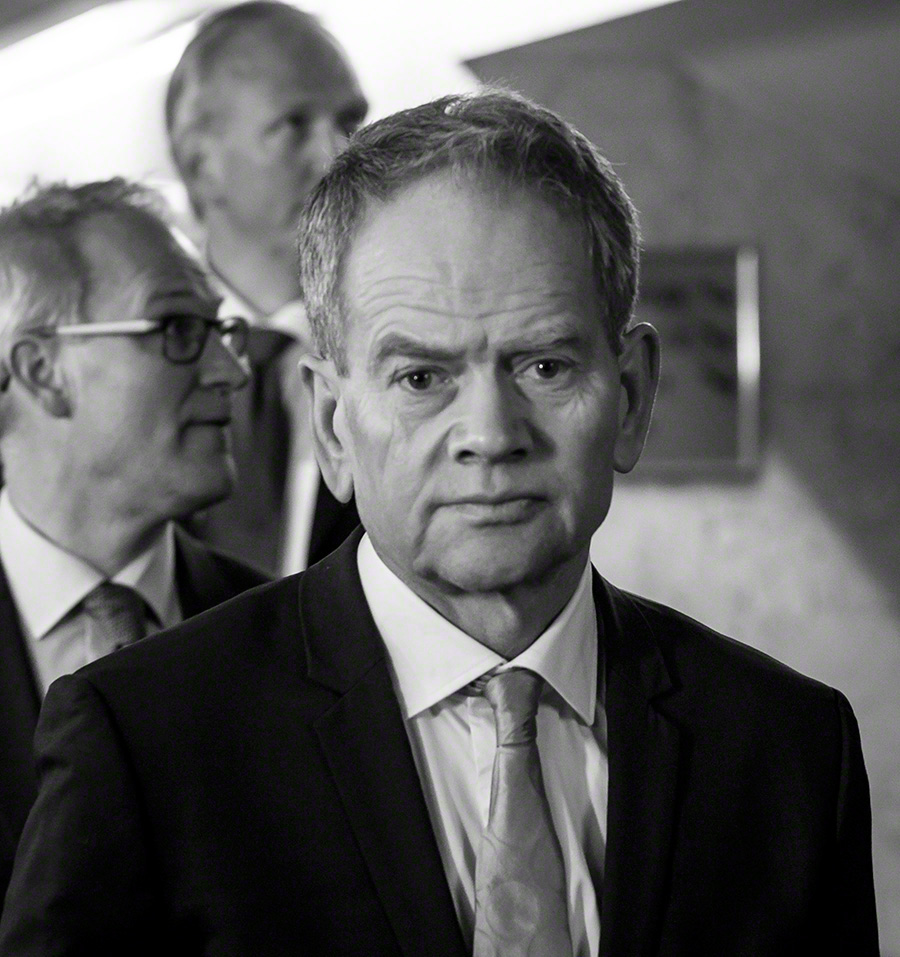
Magnus Takvam in 2016

Magnus Takvam (born 26 June 1952) is a Norwegian journalist.

He is currently employed as a news analyst in the Norwegian Broadcasting Corporation, appearing on the evening news Dagsrevyen and the radio news magazine Dagsnytt Atten. He was employed in the Norwegian Broadcasting Corporation in 1983.

Magnus Takvam is the son of poet Marie Takvam.
