= Zaza Burchuladze =

Georgian novelist and dramatist

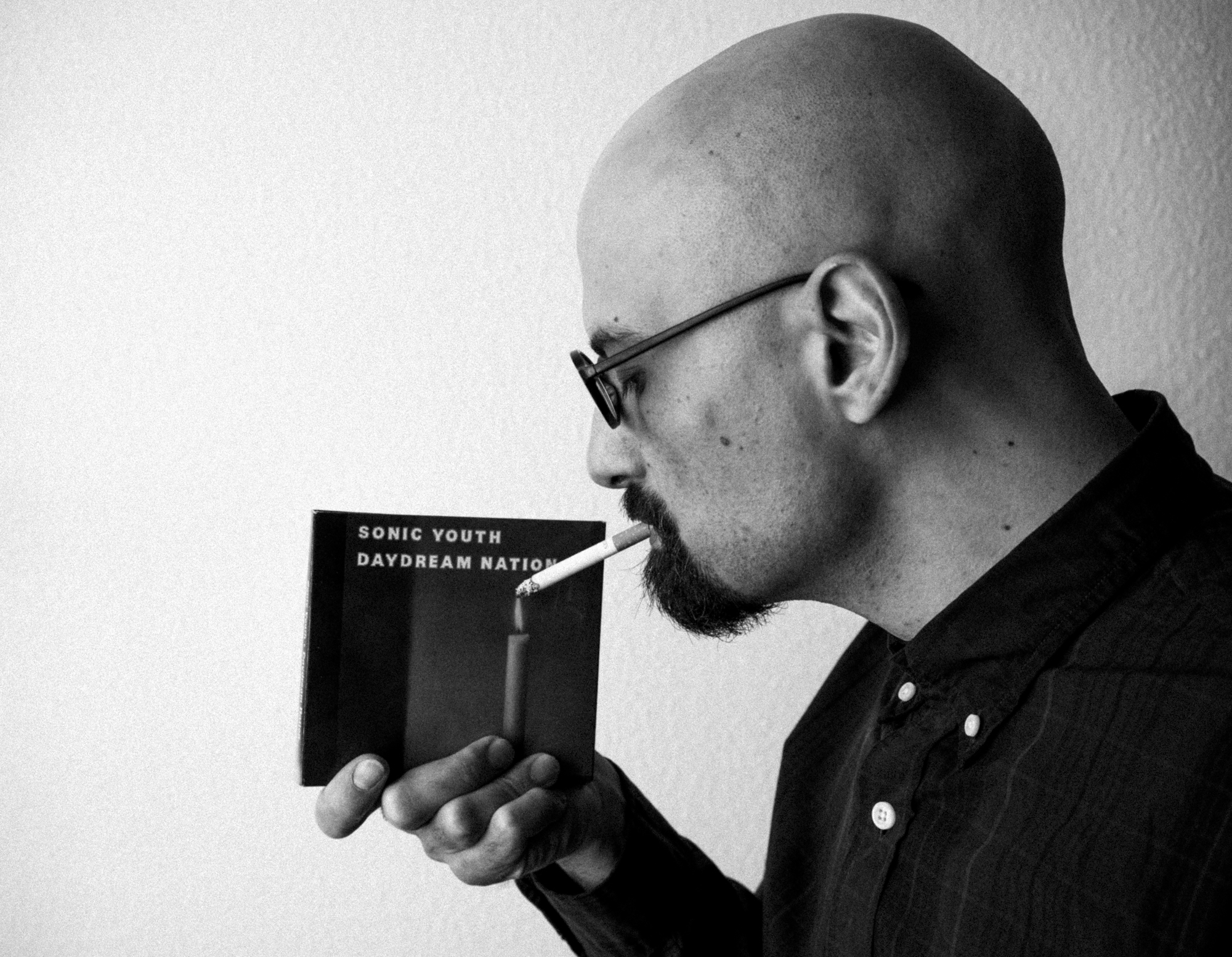
- Born: 9 September 1973 (age 53)
- Education: Tbilisi State Academy of Arts
- Writing career
- Language: Georgian
- Genre: Postmodernism
- Notable work: adibas (2009)

Zaza Burchuladze (Georgian: ზაზა ბურჭულაძე; born 9 September 1973 in Tbilisi, Georgia) is a contemporary postmodern Georgian novelist and dramatist. Currently, he lives and works in Berlin, Germany.

== Biography ==
Zaza Burchuladze graduated with honors from the monumental and ornamental painting department of Tbilisi State Academy of Arts.

Since 1998 he has been publishing his stories in Georgian newspapers and magazines. He worked as a freelance journalist for Radio Free Europe/Radio Liberty while teaching literature and contemporary art at the Caucasian Media Institute

Until 2001 Burchuladze published his works under a pen-name of Gregor Samsa. He translated the books of Fyodor Dostoyevsky and Daniil Kharms into Georgian.

His narratives often startle the audience with experimental writing and provocative themes. He writes about political conformity, violence and brutality, sexuality, and ideological and religious topics.

Burchuladze's books have been translated into several languages.

== Bibliography ==
=== Novels ===
- My Song, Tbilisi, Bakur Sulakauri Publishing, 2023
- Zoorama, Tbilisi, Bakur Sulakauri Publishing, 2021
- Tourist Breakfast, Tbilisi, Bakur Sulakauri Publishing, 2015
- Inflatable Angel, Tbilisi, Bakur Sulakauri Publishing, 2011
- adibas, Tbilisi, Bakur Sulakauri Publishing, 2009
- Instant Kafka, Tbilisi, Bakur Sulakauri Publishing, 2005
- Mineral Jazz, Tbilisi, Bakur Sulakauri Publishing in 2003

=== Translations ===
- Zoorama, German, Klett-Cotta Verlag / Tropen, 2022
- Inflatable Angel, German, Aufbau Verlag / Blumenbar, 2018
- Tourist Breakfast, German, Aufbau Verlag / Blumenbar, 2017
- adibas, Czech, Dobrovsky, 2016
- adibas, German, Aufbau Verlag / Blumenbar, 2015
- Inflatable Angel, Russian, Ad Marginem, 2014
- adibas, English, Dalckey Archive, 2014
- Inflatable Angel, French, L'Âge d'Homme, 2013
- adibas, Russian, Ad Marginem, 2011
- Instant Kafka, Russian, Ad Marginem, 2008
- Mineral Jazz, Russian, Ad Marginem, 2007

== Literary awards ==
- Work Stipend from Senate of Berlin, 2020
- „Brücke Berlin“ Prize for Tourist Breakfast, 2018
- Best Georgian Novel of the year (Iliauni Prize) for Inflatable Angel, 2011
- Best Georgian Novel of the year (Tsinandali prize) for Mineral Jazz, 2003
