= Øyvind Vågnes =

Norwegian novelist, magazine editor and researcher (1972–2025)

- Born: 4 August 1972; Brattvåg, Norway
- Died: 7 January 2025 (aged 52); Bergen, Norway
- Occupations: Novelist; Magazine editor
- Awards: Nynorsk Literature Prize (2005)

Øyvind Vågnes (4 August 1972 – 7 January 2025) was a Norwegian novelist, magazine editor and researcher.

== Life and career ==
Vågnes was born in Brattvåg on 4 August 1972. He made his literary debut in 2003 with the novel Ingen skal sove i natt. He was awarded the Nynorsk Literature Prize in 2005, for the novel Ekko. He was co-editor of the magazine Ekfrase - Nordisk Tidsskrift for Visuell Kultur. Among his non-fiction works are Zaprudered : the Kennedy Assassination Film in Visual Culture from 2011, for which he was awarded the Peter C. Rollins Book Award, and Den dokumentariske teikneserien from 2014.

Further novels are the science fiction novel Sone Z from 2014, about a future fictional surveillance society. In his satirical novel Vesaas from 2017, the protagonist works with writing a biography about Tarjei Vesaas. His last novel was Ei verd utan hestar from 2022.

Vågnes died from lung fibrosis at Haukeland hospital in Bergen, on 7 January 2025, at the age of 52.
