= Lars Amund Vaage =

Norwegian writer

Lars Amund Vaage (born 1952 at Sunde, Kvinnherad on the west coast of Norway) studied classical piano at the Bergen Music Conservatory. He made his literary debut in 1979 with the novel Exercise Cold Winter, and has since published award-winning novels, short stories and collections of poetry, and a long essay on the art of storytelling, Sorrow and Song, 2016. In 1995 he had a definitive breakthrough in Norway with the Critics' Prize-winning novel Rubato. In 2012, his acclaimed novel Sing, based on his experience of being the parent of a severely autistic child, was a national bestseller, winning the national Brage Prize and nominated for the Critics' Prize. It has since become a classic.

"The one to whom I write this cannot read." That is the opening sentence of Sing. It is also the key to the way this established novelist needs to find in order to tell his life-changing story, which for many years and many different reasons he did not think would be possible. In Sorrow and Song he expands on this decisive moment and sheds light on other insights into the art of writing, such as the relevance of music and rhythm in prose, and how fiction offers a certain freedom of speech which confessional literature does not.

The Little Pianist (2017) is a collection of short stories regarding love, longing, and the absence of love. The characters seek a personal language to connect with others. They face challenges while art is presented as a potential source of insight, though its representatives may be difficult to navigate. The narrative explores the difficulty of finding love without prior experience of it, and the potential for alienation from oneself and one's community after leaving home.

His work has been translated into English, German, Swedish, Russian, Polish and Hindi.

He was the festival writer with Bergen International Festival in 2001, and Dei nynorske festspela (The New Norwegian Festival) in 2008.

Vaage is the grandson of the Norwegian author Ragnvald Vaage (1889–1963).

== Awards ==
- Sokneprest Alfred Andersson-Ryssts fond 1990
- Norsk Forfattersentrums pris 1993
- Samlagsprisen 1993
- Aschehoug Prize 1995
- Norwegian Critics Prize for Literature 1995, for Rubato
- Nynorsk litteraturpris 1995, for Rubato
- Dobloug Prize 1997
- Oktoberprisen 1999
- Gyldendalprisen 2002
- P2-lytternes romanpris 2002, for Kunsten å gå
- Emmausprisen 2005, for Tangentane
- Melsomprisen 2011, for Skuggen og dronninga (The Shadow and the Queen)
- Nynorsk litteraturpris 2012, for Syngja (Sing)
- Brageprisen 2012, for Syngja (Sing)

== Bibliography ==
- Øvelse Kald vinter (Exercise Cold Winter) - novel (1979)
- Fager kveldsol smiler (The Fair Evening Sun Smiles) - novel (1982)
- Kyr (Cows) - short stories - (1983)
- Dra meg opp (Pull Me Up)- novel (1985)
- Baronen (The Baron) – play (1987)
- Begynnelsen (The Beginning) - novel (1989)
- Guten med den mjuke magen (The Boy with the Soft Tummy) - children’s book (1990)
- Oklahoma - novel (1992)
- Rubato - novel (1995)
- Den framande byen (The Strange City) – a novel about Wilhelm Reich (1999)
- Guten og den vesle mannen (The Boy and the Little Man) - children’s book (2000)
- Det andre rommet (The Other Room) - poetry (2001)
- Kunsten å gå (The Art of Walking) - novel (2002)
- Tangentane (The Piano Keys) - novel (2005)
- Utanfor institusjonen (Outside the Institution) - poetry (2006)
- Skuggen og dronninga (The Shadow and the Queen) – novel (2010)
- Den stumme (The Mute) – poetry (2011)
- Syngja (Sing) – novel (2012)
- Den raude staden (The Red Place) – poetry (2014)
- Sorg og song (Sorrow and Song) – essay (2016)
- Den vesle pianisten (The Little Pianist) – short stories (2017)
