= Arthur Klæbo =

Norwegian journalist

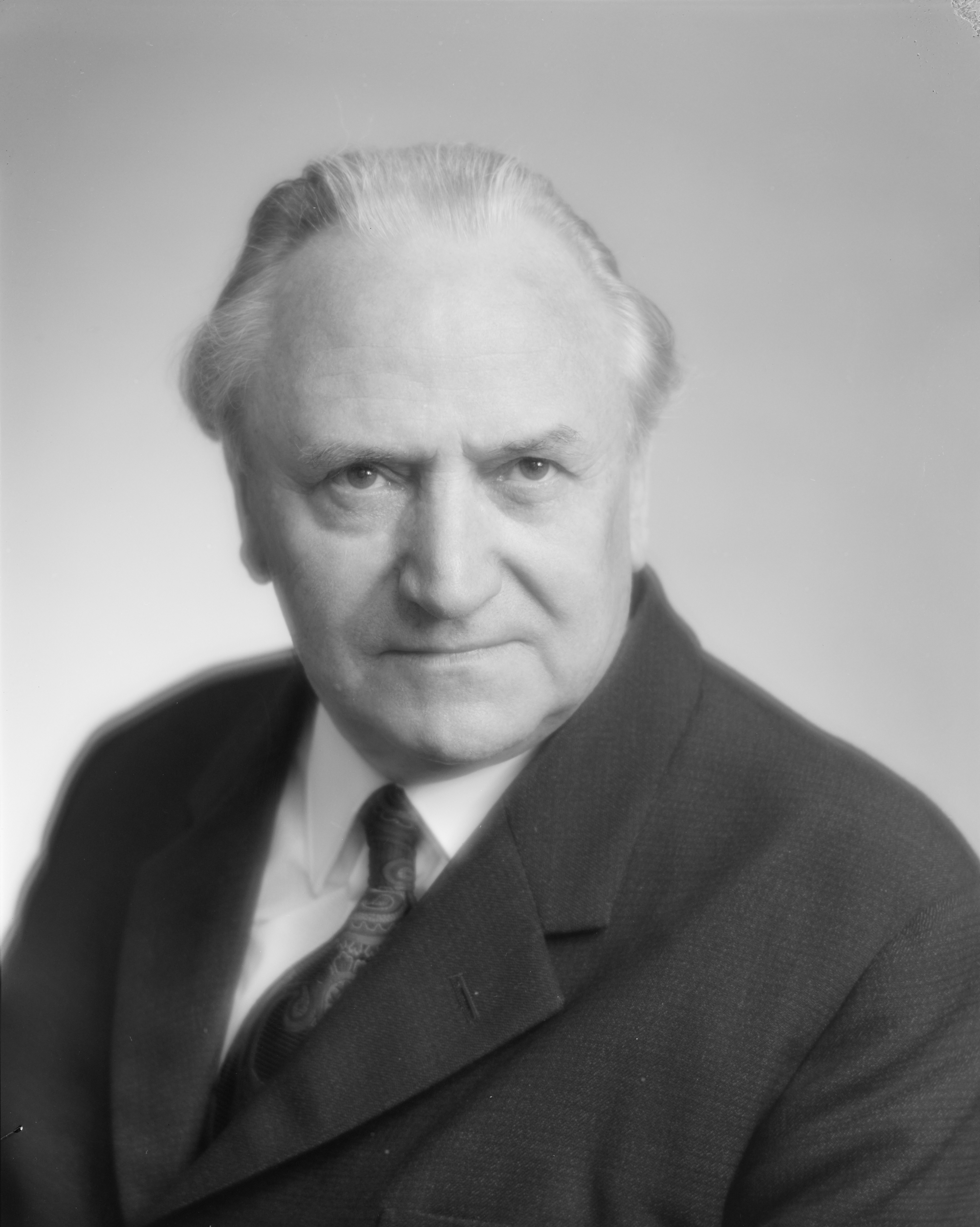
- Arthur Klæbo, 1975
- Born: 6 August 1908; Ålesund, Norway
- Died: 21 July 1985 (aged 76); Oslo
- Occupation: Journalist

Arthur Klæbo (6 August 1908 – 21 July 1985) was a Norwegian journalist.

== Personal life ==
Klæbo was born in Ålesund to Konrad Klæbo and Marie P. Ryste. In 1936 he married Astrid Melle.

== Career ==
Klæbo worked a journalist for the newspaper Den 17de Mai from 1929 to 1934. From 1935 he was a journalist in the magazine Hallo! Hallo!, for the Norwegian Broadcasting Corporation, and edited the relaunched weekly magazine Programbladet from 1945. He was also a popular radio causeur, with his characteristic style and voice. Among his books are Farlige fjell from 1942, a biography on Alfred Maurstad from 1945, and Dette er Norsk rikskringkasting from 1953. His collections of radio talks include Arvesølvet blinkar bak glasdisken (1951), Ullstrømper til Afrika (1963), God kveld godtfolk (1968), and På eiga bølgjelengd (1977). He was awarded the Melsom Prize in 1965.
