= Marie Takvam =

Norwegian writer (1926–2008)

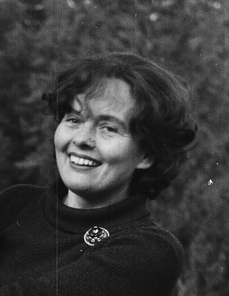
- Takvam in 1965
- Born: Marie Ragnhild Skylstad; 5 December 1926; Ørsta, Norway
- Died: 28 January 2008 (aged 81)
- Occupations: poet, children's writer, novelist, playwright and actress
- Children: Magnus Takvam

Marie Ragnhild Takvam (née Skylstad; 5 December 1926 – 28 January 2008) was a Norwegian poet, novelist, writer of children's books, playwright and actress.

== Biography ==
Takvam was born in Ørsta Municipality in Møre og Romsdal, Norway. Her parents were Johan Skylstad (1883-1974) and Martha Sperre (1901-1983). She grew up in the neighboring Hjørundfjord Municipality as the eldest of five siblings of a farm family. After graduation artium at Nordfjordeid in 1945, she moved to Oslo together with her future husband Johannes Takvam (1925-2003). They were married in 1950; their marriage dissolved in 1975. Takvam studied psychology at the University of Oslo, but had to cancel her studies when her eldest son was born. She was the mother of journalist Magnus Takvam.

In the 1950s and 1960s, Takvam worked as program leader for the children's programming at NRK. She published 12 poetry collections over a 45-year period. She made her literary debut in 1952 with the poetry collection Dåp under sju stjerner. Among her other collections are Merke etter liv from 1962, Brød og tran from 1969, and Falle og reise seg att from 1980.

Marie Takvam was awarded several literary including the Dobloug Prize in 1983, and the Nynorsk Literature Prize in 1997 and Melsomprisen in 1998. She died in 2008 at Ljabruhjemmet in Oslo and was buried at Vestre gravlund.

== Bibliography ==
- Dåp under sju stjerner, 1952
- Syngjande kjelder, 1954
- Merke etter liv, 1962
- Mosaikk i lys, 1965
- Brød og tran, 1969
- Auger, hender, 1975
- Dansaren, 1975
- Falle og reise seg att, 1980
- Brevet frå Alexandra, 1981
- Aldrande drabantby, 1987
- Rognebær, 1990
- Dikt i samling, 1997

== Filmography ==
- Åpenbaringen (1977)
- Det tause flertall (1977)
- Hvem har bestemt? (1978)
- Løperjenten (1981)
