= Edvard Hoem =

Norwegian writer, poet, translator and playwright

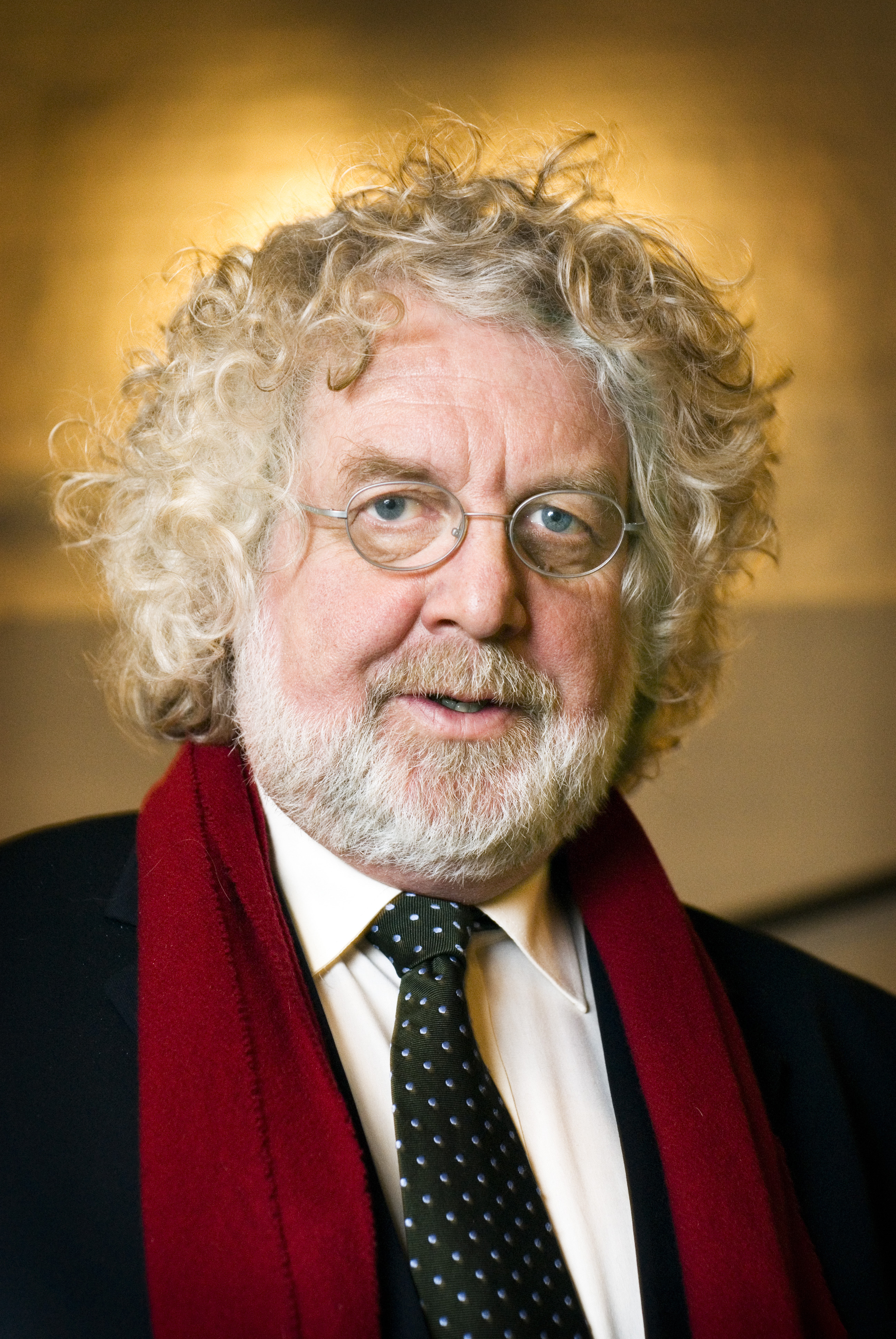
- Hoem at the 2006; Nordic Council Literature Prize
- Born: 10 March 1949 (age 77); Fræna Municipality, Norway
- Occupations: Author, novelist, essayist
- Writing career
- Genres: Fiction, plays, essays

Edvard Hoem (born 10 March 1949) is a Norwegian novelist, dramatist, lyricist, psalmist and government scholar. He made his literary debut in 1969, with the poetry collection Som grønne musikantar. He was awarded the Norwegian Critics Prize for Literature in 1974 for the novel Kjærleikens ferjereiser. He was awarded the Melsom Prize in 2006, and the Peter Dass Prize in 2007 for the novel Mors og fars historie. He received the Ibsen Prize in 2008 for the play Mikal Hetles siste ord.

Several of his books (Kjærleikens ferjereiser (1974), Prøvetid (1984), Ave Eva (1987), Mors og fars historie (2005)) have been nominated for the Nordic Council's Literature Prize, but did not win this award.

Hoem was the director of the theater, Teatret Vårt (in Molde) 1997–1999. He has translated at least eleven of Shakespeare's plays into Norwegian.

== Bibliography ==
- Som grønne musikantar – Poems (1969)
- Landet av honning og aske – Poems (1970)
- Anna Lena – Novel (1971)
- Kvinnene langs fjorden – Play (1973)
- Kjærleikens ferjereiser – Novel (1974)
- Tusen fjordar, tusen fjell og Musikken gjennom Gleng – Play (1977)
- Gi meg de brennende hjerter 1. Melding frå Petrograd – Novel (1978)
- Der storbåra bryt – Play (1979)
- Fjerne Berlin. Gi meg de brennande hjerter 2 – Novel (1980)
- God natt Europa – Play (1982)
- Du er blitt glad i dette landet – Poems (1982)
- Lenins madame – Play (1983)
- Prøvetid – Novel (1984)
- Heimlandet Barndom – Novel (1985)
- Ave Eva – Novel (1987)
- Landkjenning Romsdal (1987)
- Sankt Olavs skrin (1989)
- Til ungdommen, Nordahl Griegs liv (1989)
- I Tom Bergmanns tid – Novel (1991)
- Engelen din, Robinson – Novel (1993)
- Olav Engelbrektsson – Opera (1993) (music: Henning Sommerro)
- I kampens hete – Essay (1994)
- Bibelhistorier – (1994)
- Meisteren og Mirjam – Play (1995)
- Tid for klage, tid for dans – Novel (1996)
- Frøken Dreyers musikkskole – Novel (2000).
- Audun Hestakorn – Play (2002)
- Eystein av Nidaros – Opera (2003) (music: Henning Sommerro)
- Roerne i Christiania – Documentary novel (2003)
- Kristuskonfigurasjonar – (2003)
- Den fattige Gud – Psalms and ballads (2003)
- Kom fram, fyrste! – Historic novel (2004)
- Mors og fars historie – novel (2005)
- Faderen. Peder Bjørnson forsvarer seg (The Father. Peder Bjørnson Defends Himself.) – biography on Bjørnstjerne Bjørnson's father (2007)
- Villskapens år (The Wild Years. The Life of Bjørnstjerne Bjørnson 1832–1875) – biography on Bjørnstjerne Bjørnson (2009)
- Vennskap i storm – Bjørnstjerne Bjørnson 1875-1892 (2010)
- Syng mig hjæm – Bjørnstjerne Bjørnson 1890-1899 (2011)
- Slåttekar i himmelen – Novel (2014)
- Bror din på prærien ["your brother on the prairie"]
- Land ingen har sett ["countries no one has seen"]
- Felemakaren ["the fiddle maker"] (2020)

== Translations ==
Edvard Hoem's most famous retranslations (Year of translation in brackets).

- King Lear by William Shakespeare (1981)
- Romeo and Juliet by William Shakespeare (1985)
- The Merchant of Venice by William Shakespeare (1990)
- Troilus and Cressida by William Shakespeare (1993)
- Othello by William Shakespeare (1996)
- The Taming of the Shrew by William Shakespeare (1997)
- Richard III by William Shakespeare (1998)
- Macbeth by William Shakespeare (1999)
- As You Like It by William Shakespeare (2000)
- A Dream Play by August Strindberg (2004)
- Henry IV, Part 1 and Henry IV, Part 2 by William Shakespeare (2008–2009)

== Awards ==
- The Sunnmøre Prize 1974 for Kjærleikens ferjereiser
- Norwegian Critics Prize for Literature 1974 for Kjærleikens ferjereiser
- Pastor Alfred Andersson-Rysst Bursary 1978
- Aschehoug Prize 1985
- Nynorsk Literature Prize 1987 for Ave Eva
- Dobloug Prize 1988
- Melsom Prize 1988
- Gyldendal's Endowment 1989
- The Sarpsborg Prize 1993
- Bible Prize from Norwegian Bible Society for reproduction of the bible 1995
- Emmaus Prize 2004 for Krituskonfigurasjonar
- Melsom Prize 2006 for Mors og fars historie (Mother's and Father's Story)
- Peter Dass Prize 2007 for Mors og fars historie (Mother's and Father's Story)
- Ibsen Prize 2008
- Ikaros Prize
- Neshornet, Klassekampen's Cultural Prize 2009
- Government scholar 2012
