= Gunnstein Akselberg =

Norwegian linguist

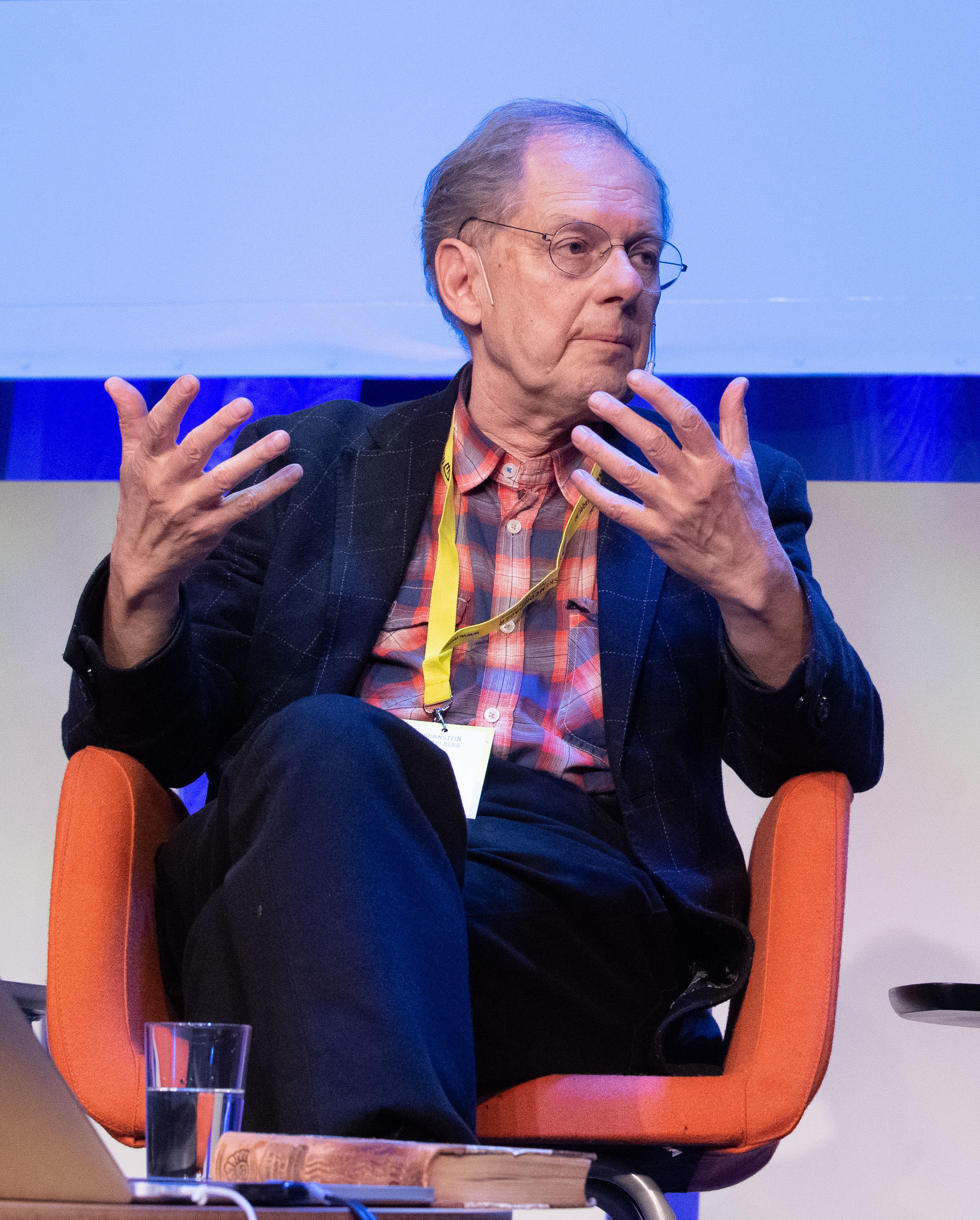
Gunnstein Akselberg, 2019

Gunnstein Akselberg (born July 20, 1949) is a Norwegian linguist and professor of Nordic linguistics at the University of Bergen.

Akselberg was born in Voss Municipality. He studied at the University of Bergen and became a candidatus philologiæ in 1979. He received his doctorate in 1995 with a dissertation on sociolinguistic relations in the Voss Municipality, titled Fenomenologisk dekonstruksjon av det labov-milroyske paradigmet i sosiolingvistikken. Ein analyse av sosio-lingvistiske tilhøve i Voss kommune (Phenomenological Deconstruction of the Labov-Milroy Paradigm in Sociolinguistics: An Analysis of Sociolinguistic Conditions in the Municipality of Voss). He served as dean of the Faculty of Humanities at the University of Bergen from 2005 to 2009.

Akselberg's research interests include sociolinguistics, dialectology, and onomastics. In addition to Norwegian, he also works on Faroese. He served as an editor of the journals Namn og Nemne (Name and Denomination) and Nordica Bergensia (Bergen Nordic Studies), and has been active in the language program Snakk med oss (Talk with Us) on the NRK Hordaland channel since 1997.

== Selected publications ==
- Veg- og gatenamnleksikon for Vossabygdi (Voss District Road and Street Name Lexicon; Voss: Hangur forlag, 1984)
- Ord og uttrykk frå Hordaland (Words and Phrases from Hordaland; Oslo: Samlaget, 2008)
- Frå Bontelabo til Ånuglo. Stadnamn i Hordaland (From Bontelabo to Ånuglo: Town Names in Hordaland; Oslo: Samlaget, 2012)
