= Oddmund Hagen =

Norwegian writer

- Born: 21 February 1950 (age 76); Snillfjord Municipality, Norway
- Occupations: Poet; Novelist; Children's writer Literary critic

Oddmund Hagen (born 21 February 1950) is a Norwegian poet, novelist, children's writer and literary critic.

== Personal life ==
Hagen was born in Snillfjord Municipality on 21 February 1950.

== Literary career ==
He made his literary debut in 1977 with the poetry collection Kvardagar. Other collections are Tiltale from 1980, Heller ikkje du from 1992, and Bort, bort frå dette from 1994. In 1989 he wrote the short story collection Å legge til – at alt er borte, and a second collection, Denne brannen, alltid, came in 1995. In 1996 he wrote the novel Utmark, about an outsider who returns home from a journey. His children's books include three picture books about the hare baby "Klumpen", Over jordet from 1998, Rundt jordet from 2000, and Bort frå jordet from 2003 – illustrated by Akin Düzakin.

== Awards ==
- Nynorsk Literature Prize 1996 for Utmark
- Samlagsprisen 1999

== See also ==
- Norwegian literature
