= Tom Kummer =

Swiss journalist (born 1961)

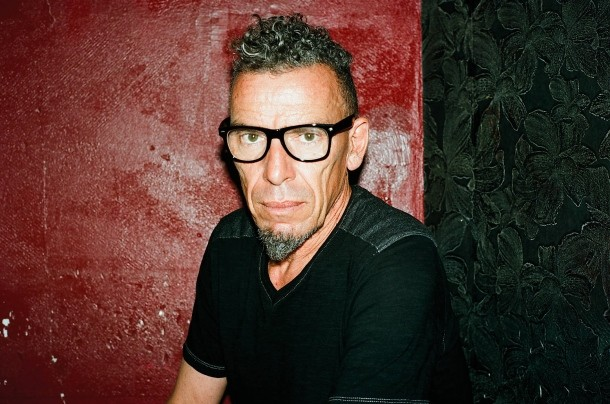
Tom Kummer

Tom Kummer (born 14 January 1961) is a Swiss journalist who published numerous celebrity profiles in Germany and Switzerland. It was discovered that Kummer never met his subjects. His primary publisher, Süddeutsche Zeitung issued a public apology for running Kummer's stories, calling them "a betrayal of monumental proportions". His work was also published in Der Spiegel, Stern, the Tagesanzeiger, the Berner Zeitung, and the Frankfurter Allgemeine Zeitung. Because of the timespan in which his bogus reporting appeared in print, he has earned comparisons to Jayson Blair and Stephen Glass.

== Celebrities profiled ==
Tom Kummer published fake interviews with the following celebrities:

- Courtney Love
- Mike Tyson
- Sharon Stone
- Brad Pitt
- Kim Basinger
- Christina Ricci
- Tom Hanks
- Liv Tyler
- Bruce Willis
- Robert Redford
- Kevin Costner
- Snoop Doggy Dogg
- Whitney Houston
- Ivana Trump
- Sean Penn
- Pamela Anderson

== Style ==
In his profile of Mike Tyson, Kummer quotes the boxer talking about eating cockroaches with bread in prison in order to get more protein. Sharon Stone confesses her sexual fantasies to Kummer, and she expresses a desire to "irritate men from wholly different classes of society". In Kummer's profile of Kim Basinger, she reveals that she gave Alec Baldwin see-through underwear.

Courtney Love describes herself as "depressed, empty, and stupid." She also says, "There are seagulls on the Riviera, slurping ice-cooled gin and tonics," and, "Minotauruses are eating the genitals of the moon." Kummer has Brad Pitt saying, "sometimes, something will be hanging out of my nose for days." Bruce Willis tells Kummer, "I understood pretty early on that we do not advance through morality, but immorality, vices, cynicism."

Kummer was fond of injecting references to other writers in his profiles, often by having a celebrity quote an author. He discusses Neuromancer with Pamela Anderson. He has Sean Penn quote Kierkegaard and Mike Tyson quote Nietzsche.

== Discovery ==
Marie Claire sought out Kummer for an interview at the height of his success. He told the magazine that his secret was to demand no less than 45 minutes with his subject. According to Katie Roiphe, "What eventually betrayed [Kummer] was his inability to be banal, his desire to put ideas into people's mouths that they would never actually utter."

Holger Hoetzel, a journalist with Focus magazine, uncovered Kummer's fraud. Hoetzel was suspicious of Kummer's access to such famous celebrities, and along with many of his foreign correspondent colleagues, he was being hounded by his editors to match Kummer's efforts. One reporter claimed, "Our editors were ringing up and saying, Why can't you go fishing with Bruce Willis, riding with Robert Redford and playing golf with Kevin Costner?"

Kummer's profile of Courtney Love, in particular, struck Hoetzel as too outlandish to be true. "That did it for me. We all know Courtney Love is far out, but this was something else. This woman has been so controlling about all press and all interviews were conducted under extremely restrictive circumstances. And yet this guy seemed to have this incredible access." Hoetzel translated Kummer's profile of Love and sent it to her publicist, which began the cascade of denials from publicists who insisted their clients had never even met Kummer.

One of the chief editors of Süddeutsche Zeitung, Christian Kaemmerling, said the paper began to suspect Kummer's work was false in 1999. They also discovered that Kummer had been fired for writing a fabricated story in another paper in 1990. Kammerling and his colleague Ulf Poschardt were both fired for publishing Kummer's hoaxes. Claus Lutterbeck, one of the foreign correspondents who was also being pressured to match Kummer's success, explained how such an elaborate and sustained fraud could happen among the foreign press in Hollywood. "The problem is that no one, not even our bosses, knows how Hollywood really works. They don't know how hard it is to get any access at all. They think we spend our time at cocktail parties with movie stars. So someone like Kummer can come along and they have no control over him."

== Aftermath ==
Kummer has maintained a largely unapologetic stance about his work. He has referred to his work as "montage reporting" from "the school of borderline reporting", where his goal was simply to entertain the reader, knowing full well that celebrities would never provide such interesting material. He told the Berner Zeitung, "Interviews are an art form. Only people in Switzerland still believe that they have to be true word for word." SZ-Magazin, the Friday section of Süddeutsche Zeitung where his profiles appeared would frequently feature satirical articles and graphics. Even some of his publishers came to his defense. The Frankfurter Allgemeine Zeitung went on record as dismissing the celebrity profile genre as "tedious", concluding: "No exclusive interviews blossom behind the hedges of Malibu, and the people who live there are paying a lot of money to make sure things stay that way." In the preface for a 1997 compilation of Kummer's interviews, Ulf Poschardt actually outlines Kummer's gonzo journalism as a "stylistic honing during the transcription of the tapes", where Kummer "decided to add his authorship into the framework of classical journalism, to inject it with fun and intelligence, taking no prisoners."

Kummer is the subject of a 2011 documentary called Bad Boy Kummer by Miklós Gimes.
