= The Lion Woman (film) =

- Directed by: Vibeke Idsøe
- Based on: The Lion Woman by Erik Fosnes Hansen
- Starring: Ida Ursin-Holm; Rolf Lassgård
- Release date: 26 August 2016
- Running time: 126 minutes
- Country: Norway
- Language: Norwegian

The Lion Woman (Norwegian: Løvekvinnen) is a 2016 Norwegian drama film directed by Vibeke Idsøe. The film is an international coproduction and had a budget of approximately NOK 52 million. Parts of the film were shot in Lillehammer, and the rest was recorded at various locations. The film had its world premiere on August 26, 2016.

== Plot ==
In 1912, a Norwegian woman dies in childbirth, leaving behind a daughter born with hypertrichosis, or excessive hair growth, and a grieving husband who hides the girl from gawkers.

== Cast ==
- Ida Ursin-Holm - Eva (23)
- Mathilde Thomine Storm - Eva (14)
- Aurora Lindseth-Løkka - Eva (7)
- Rolf Lassgård - Gustav
- Rolf Kristian Larsen - Sparky
- Kjersti Tveterås - Hannah
- Lars Knutzon - Professor Stroem
- Kåre Conradi - Jahnn
- Lisa Loven Kongsli - Ruth
- Connie Nielsen - Mrs. Grjothornet
- Henrik Mestad - Swammerdamm
- Ken Duken - Andrej
