= Egil Børre Johnsen =

Norwegian writer (born 1936)

Egil Børre Johnsen (born 14 July 1936 in Oslo) is a Norwegian author.

Johnsen has written several non-fiction books on Norwegian language, literature and schools, as well as textbooks for upper secondary schools. In his book Det store bondefangeriet (1981), he critiqued the Norwegian subject in schools. Later, he edited the three-volume work Vårt eget språk (Our own language). He has also published biographies of Nordahl Rolfsen and Knud Knudsen.

In 2006, he received the Riksmål Society Literature Prize for his biography Unorsk og norsk about Knud Knudsen, who is considered the father of Riksmål and Bokmål.
