= Odd Abrahamsen =

Norwegian poet

- Born: 20 May 1924; Fredrikstad
- Died: 23 June 2001 (aged 77)
- Occupation: Poet
- Awards: Riksmål Society Literature Prize (1983); Fritt Ord Honorary Award (1992)

Odd Abrahamsen (20 May 1924 – 23 June 2001) was a Norwegian poet. He was born in Fredrikstad.

Among his collections are Om det finnes en stillhet (1962), Nedslag (1971) and Makten skal tie (1944).

He was awarded the Riksmål Society Literature Prize in 1983. He received the Fritt Ord Honorary Award for his poetical contributions for the Baltic countries.
