= Inger Margrethe Gaarder =

Norwegian children's writer

Inger Margrethe Gaarder (née Berthelsen; 8 June 1926 – 31 December 1993) was a Norwegian children's writer.

She made her literary debut in 1977 with the children's book Nikolai begynner på skolen. She published books with myths and fairy tales from Sri Lanka and from India, and contributed to textbooks for primary school. She was awarded the Cappelen Prize in 1986. She was the mother of Jostein Gaarder and Helge Gaarder.

Awards
Preceded by Kolbein Falkeid, Arvid Hanssen	Recipient of the Cappelen Prize; 1986 (shared with Fredrik Skagen)	Succeeded by Roy Jacobsen, Håvard Rem
