= Erna Osland =

Norwegian writer

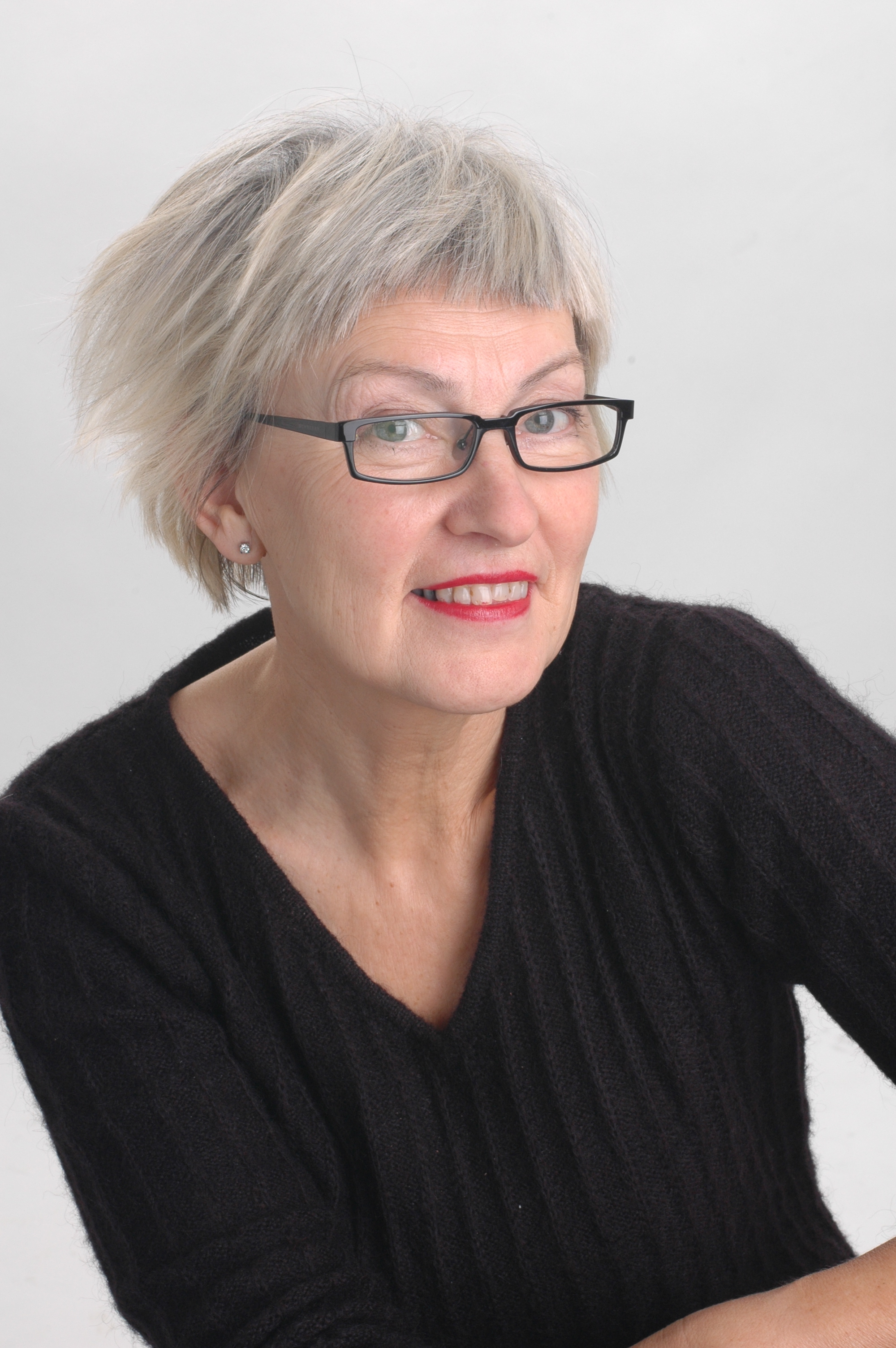
- Born: 24 February 1951 (age 75); Høyanger, Norway
- Occupations: educationalist, writer
- Writing career
- Genre: children's literature
- Notable awards: Norwegian Critics Prize for Best children's book (1999); Brage Prize (1999, 2025)

Erna Osland (born 24 February 1951) is a Norwegian teacher and author of children's literature. She made her literary debut in 1987 with the youth's book Natteramnen. She received the Norwegian Critics Prize for Best children's book in 1999 for Salamandarryttaren.

In 2025 she received the Brage Prize for best non-fiction for children and young adults, for the book Barnas verdshistorie, along with illustrator Victoria Sandøy.

== Personal life ==
Osland was born in Høyanger on 24 February 1951.

Awards
Preceded by Stein Erik Lunde	Recipient of the Brage Prize for children and youth 1999	Succeeded by Rune Belsvik
