= Arve Solstad =

Norwegian newspaper editor (1935–2016)

Arve Solstad (15 November 1935 – 3 June 2016) was a Norwegian newspaper editor.

He was born in Orkdal Municipality as a son of farmer Johan Solstad (1896–1989) and Marit Skauge (1910–2000). He finished his secondary education in Orkdal in 1955, worked one year as editor-in-chief of Akershus Folkeblad before enrolling in studies of political science at the University of Oslo. He wrote for the newspaper Dagbladet, including summaries of debates in the Norwegian Students' Society. He was hired permanently in Dagbladet after graduation in 1964. Also, in 1961 he married nurse Inger Marie Richter.

He won the Narvesen Prize for journalism already in 1968. From 1969 to 1973 he was the political editor of the newspaper, and in 1973 he became editor-in-chief. The newspaper then had two chief editors, and between 1977 and 1980 it had three, but from 1984 to 1990 Solstad was the sole editor. The newspaper assumed the tabloid format during his tenure. Solstad was then political editor from 1990 to 1995, and a journalist from 1995 to 2002. He was also leader of the Norwegian Association for Media History from 1993 to 2003, and professor of journalism at the University of Oslo from 1994. In 2000 he received the Fritt Ord Honorary Award.

Awards
Preceded by Richard Herrmann	Recipient of the Narvesen Prize; 1968 (shared with Per Egil Hegge)	Succeeded by Kai Otto Hansen
Media offices
Preceded by Roald Storsletten	Chief editor of Dagbladet; 1973–1990 (together with Roald Storsletten until 1980, also together with Jahn Otto Johansen 1977–1984)	Succeeded by Bjørn Simensen
