= Karin Sveen =

Norwegian poet, novelist and essayist

- Born: 17 August 1948 (age 78); Hamar
- Occupations: Poet, novelist and essayist
- Awards: Cappelen Prize (1984); Norsk språkpirs (2007)

Karin Sveen (born 17 August 1948) is a Norwegian poet, novelist and essayist.

== Early and personal life ==
Sveen was born in Hamar. She attended Hamar Cathedral School, and studied at the teachers' college at Hamar and the University of Oslo. She worked as schoolteacher from 1975 to 1979, and thereafter as writer full time.

== Literary career ==
Sveen made her literary debut in 1975 with the poetry collection Vinterhagen. Critics compared her with poet Hans Børli, mentioning similar relation to nature, plants and animals. In her next collection, Mjøsa går from 1976, she wrote poetry using Hedmark dialect. Further collections are Den svarte hane from 1977, Kroppens sug, hjertets savn (1985), Tegnebok (1989) and Nye dikt (1996).

Her prose includes the short story collection Døtre from 1980, Utbryterdronninga (1982), Den reddende engelen (1984), and the novel Kvinnen som forsvant (1987). In the novel Hannas hus (1991), the title figure Hanna is modeled after leader of the "Suttung" movement Ingeborg Refling Hagen. Her next novel was Maria Waters verden (1993). In 1997 she published the essay collection Den kulturelle lidelse. En bok om kropp og samfunn, and her second collection, Klassereise, came in 2000. Her essay collection Frokost med fremmede (2005) was well received by the critics. Her book from 2011, Mannen i Montgomery Street – portrett av en norsk emigrant, is a biography of Peder Sather from Odal in Hedmark, who emigrated to the United States and settled in California.

Sveen has been a board member of the Norwegian Authors' Union, and was a member of the authors' union's literary council.

She was awarded the Cappelen Prize in 1984, and the Norsk språkpris in 2007.

Awards
Preceded by Richard Herrmann, Otto Øgrim, Helmut Ormestad, Kåre Lunde	Recipient of the Cappelen Prize; 1984 (shared with Lars Saabye Christensen, Rune Belsvik, Ove Røsbak)	Succeeded by Kolbein Falkeid, Arvid Hanssen
