= Cappelen Prize =

Norwegian literary award

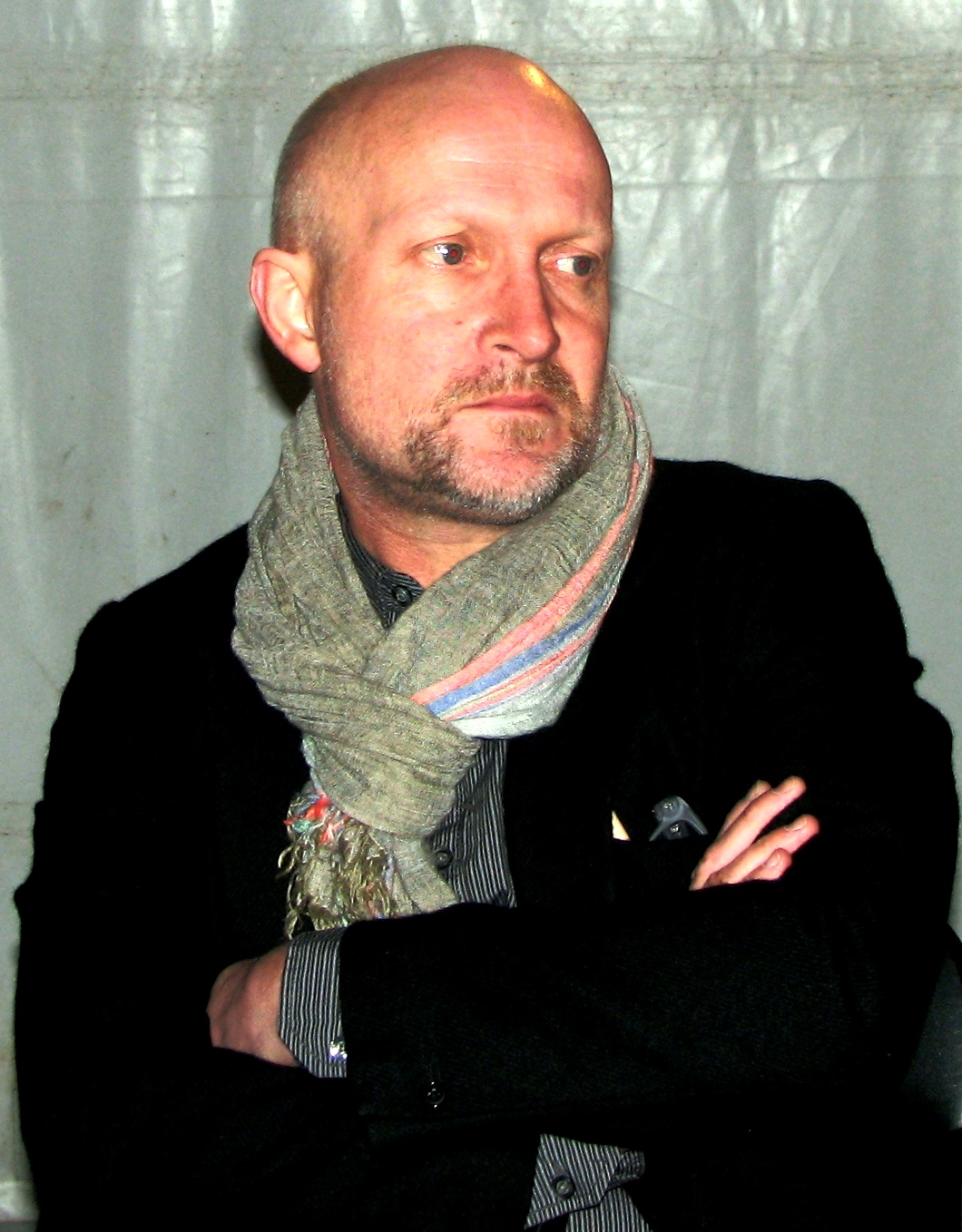
1984 winner Lars Saabye Christensen

The Cappelen Prize (Norwegian: Cappelenprisen) is a Norwegian literary award that was established in 1979 by J.W. Cappelens Forlag, one of the oldest publishing houses of Norway, on the occasion of the 150th anniversary of the publishing house. It has not been awarded after J.W. Cappelens Forlag merged with N. W. Damm & Søn to Cappelen Damm in 2007.

== Laureates ==
- 1979 – Thorbjørn Egner
- 1980 – Odd Eidem
- 1981 – Hans Normann Dahl and Vivian Zahl Olsen
- 1982 – Bjørg Vik and Jahn Otto Johansen
- 1983 – Richard Herrmann, Otto Øgrim, Helmut Ormestad and Kåre Lunde
- 1984 – Lars Saabye Christensen, Ove Røsbak, Rune Belsvik and Karin Sveen
- 1985 – Kolbein Falkeid and Arvid Hanssen
- 1986 – Inger Margrethe Gaarder and Fredrik Skagen
- 1987 – Roy Jacobsen and Håvard Rem
- 1988 – Ingvar Ambjørnsen
- 1989 – Vigdis Hjorth
- 1990 – Kjell Arild Pollestad and Hans-Wilhelm Steinfeld
- 1991 – Paal-Helge Haugen
- 1992 – Axel Jensen
- 1993 – Erik Bye and Tor Bomann-Larsen
- 1994 – No award
- 1995 – No award
- 1996 – Gert Nygårdshaug
- 1997 – Erlend Loe
- 1998 – No award
- 1999 – Georg Johannesen
- 2000 – Gro Dahle
- 2001 – Anne Holt
- 2002 – Jan Jakob Tønseth
- 2003 – Karin Fossum
- 2004 – Pedro Carmona-Alvarez, Ingeborg Arvola, Ørnulf Hodne, Anne-Lise Gjerdrum
- 2005 – No award
- 2006 – Erik Fosnes Hansen and Torbjørn Færøvik
- 2007 – Discontinued.
