= Otto Øgrim =

Norwegian physicist (1913–2006)

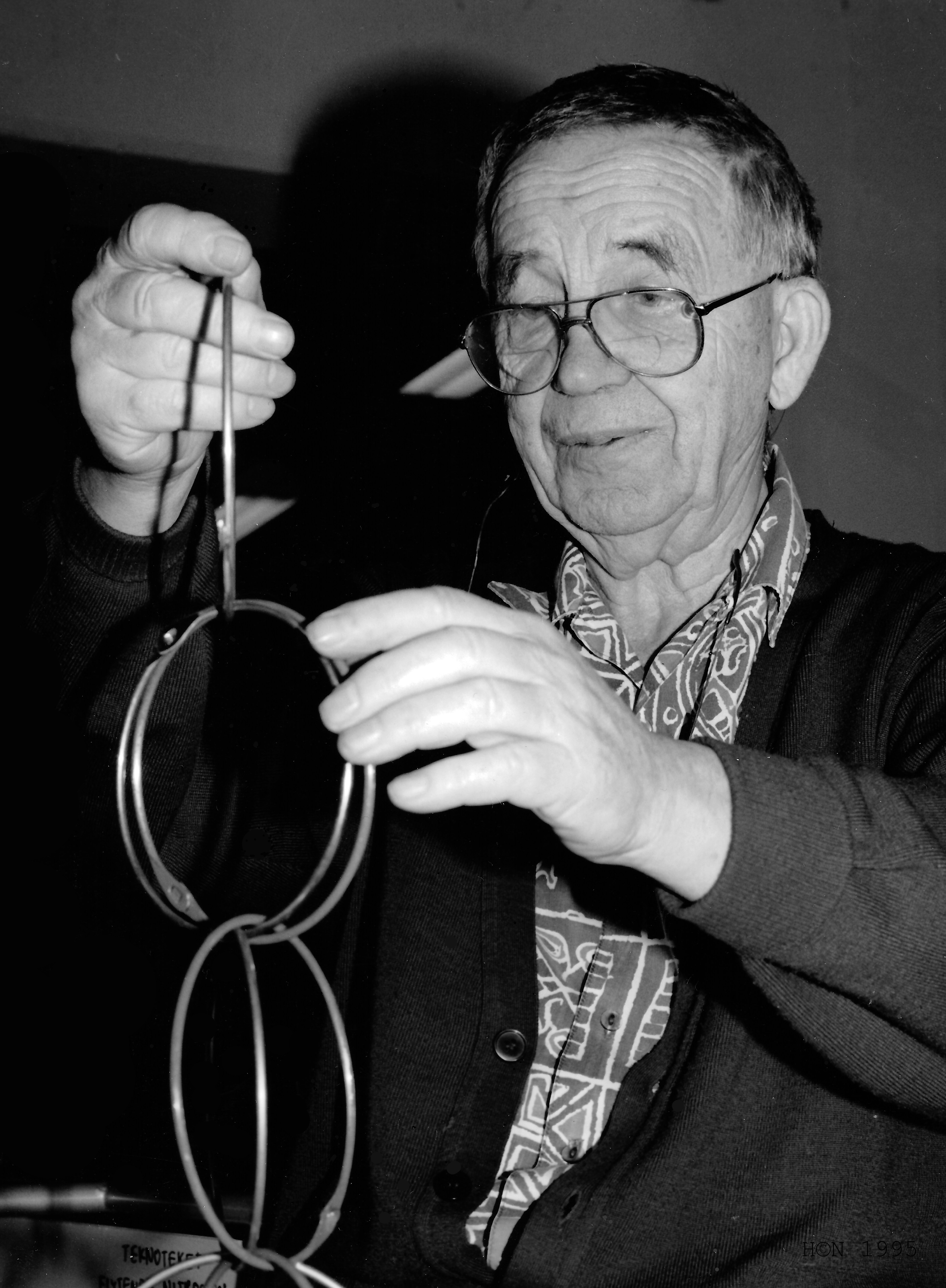
Øgrim in 1995

Johan Otto Øgrim (1 October 1913 – 6 December 2006) was a Norwegian physicist.

== Personal life ==
Øgrim was born in Copenhagen, Denmark, as a son of Tobias Immanuel Øgrim (1886–1962), leader of the Salvation Army in Norway, and salvationist Othonie Margrethe Olsen (1879–1972). He spent his childhood years in Kristiania, Bærum and Hamar.

In 1938, he married Marit Odlaug Eggen (1915–2008), a daughter of Albert Fredrik Eggen and granddaughter of Lorents Mørkved. Their son Tron Øgrim became an author and political activist. Otto Øgrim's sister married Brynjulf Bull. Otto Øgrim was also the grandfather of rappers Elling and Aslak Borgersrud in Gatas Parlament.

== Education and Second World War ==
Øgrim took commercial education at Clark's College, London in 1929. He worked as a bookkeeper's assistant in London for one year before attending middle school in Hamar from 1930 to 1931. He then moved to Oslo to work with advertising and study for the examen artium, which he completed as a private candidate in 1934.

During the Second World War, Øgrim together with Arvid Storsveen was central in establishing the secret intelligence organization XU, from its start in the summer of 1940. After Storsveen had to flee to Sweden in 1942 and was shot and killed by the Gestapo in 1943, Øgrim continued as a central XU operative in southern Norway under Øistein Strømnæs and Anne-Sofie Østvedt. He was not exposed before the end of the Occupation of Norway by Nazi Germany in May 1945.

== Physicist ==
He graduated with a cand.real. degree with a physics major in 1946. He became a professor of experimental physics at the University of Oslo in 1947. For more than 35 years, Øgrim worked as a lecturer at the Institute of Physics and a prolific textbook author at the University of Oslo.

Together with Helmut Ormestad, he was best known for presenting the TV series Fysikk på Roterommet on NRK. The two won the Cappelen Prize in 1983, for work on a widely used series of textbooks at high school level. In 2003, he was appointed honorary member of the Norwegian Physical Society, a Norwegian organization that promotes research in physics.

Selected works

- Termofysikk, (1971)
- Mekanisk fysikk, 2 volumes, (1973, 1976)

Awards
Preceded by Bjørg Vik, Jahn Otto Johansen	Recipient of the Cappelen Prize; 1983 (shared with Richard Herrmann, Helmut Ormestad, Kåre Lunde)	Succeeded by Rune Belsvik, Lars Saabye Christensen, Ove Røsbak, Karin Sveen
