= Jahn Otto Johansen =

Norwegian journalist

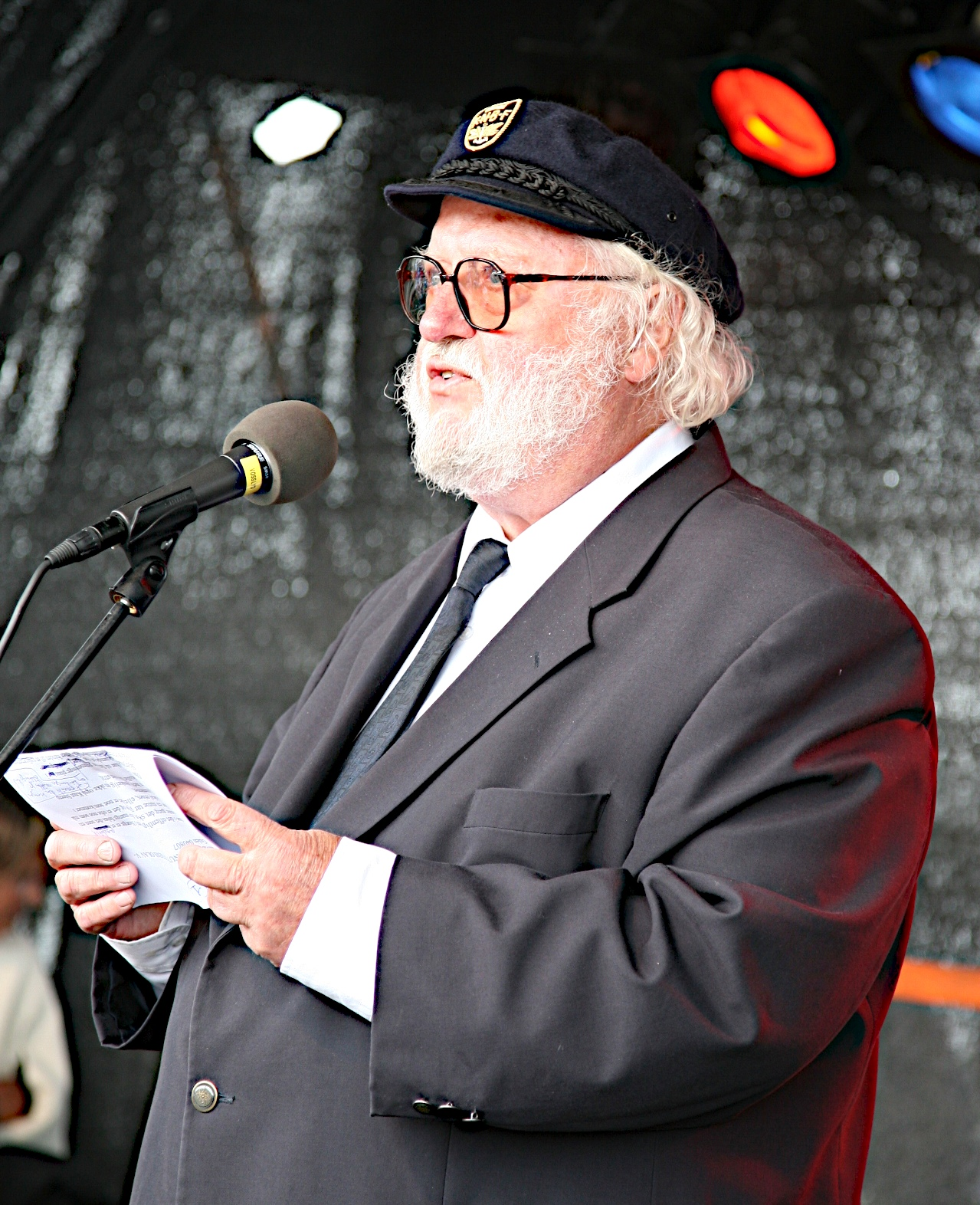
- Born: 3 May 1934; Porsgrunn, Norway
- Died: 1 January 2018 (aged 83)
- Occupations: journalist, newspaper editor, foreign correspondent and non-fiction writer

Jahn Otto Johansen (3 May 1934 – 1 January 2018) was a Norwegian journalist, newspaper editor, foreign correspondent and non-fiction writer.

He worked for the newspaper Morgenposten from 1956 to 1966, for the Norwegian Broadcasting Corporation (NRK) from 1966 to 1977, and was chief editor of Dagbladet from 1977 to 1984. He has been a foreign correspondent for NRK in Moscow, Washington, D.C., and Berlin. He wrote about sixty books, including several bestsellers.

He received the Cappelen Prize in 1982, shared with Bjørg Vik, who died six days after Johansen.

== Selected works ==
- Nikita Sergejevitsj Krusjtsjov: En kortfattet biografi Aschehoug (1960) (Oversatt av Jahn Otto Johansen)
- Studiet av Sovjetsamveldet: Referat fra en studiekonferanse 7.- 9.11.1959 (1960) (redaktør) (Norsk selskap for Sovjetstudier, i samarbeid med Norsk utenrikspolitisk institutt (NUPI))
- Polen mellom øst og vest Aschehoug (1962)
- Ti år uten Stalin Nasjonalforlaget (1963) (Skrevet sammen med Halfdan Hegtun)
- Rapport fra Sovjet - Aschehoug 1963
- Moskva-Peking: Den nye kalde krigen Aschehoug (1964) (Skrevet av Edward Crankshaw, tillegg av Jahn Otto Johansen).
- Øst-Europa i forvandling Aschehoug (1965)
- The difficult adaptation process of the Norwegian Communist Party in light of de-stalinization, the Soviet-China conflict and Khruschev's fall NUPI (1965) (Skrevet sammen med Karin Stoltenberg og Joan M. Torgersen).
- Titokratiet: Den jugoslaviske reformprosess Pax (1967)
- Sovjetunionen gjennom 50 år (red.) Tiden (1967)
- Tsjekkoslovakias skjebnetime (1968)
- Rapport fra Kina, 1972
- Jøde og araber, 1974
- Min jiddische mamma, 1980
- Supermaktsavspenningen i nytt perspektiv Den Norske Atlanterhavskomité (1981)
- Det polske drama Cappelen (1981)
- Ludvig Eikaas Stenersen (1981)
- Torolf Elster: Portrett av et mangesidig menneske Tiden (1981)(Skrevet sammen med Birgit Gjernes og Reidar Hirsti).
- Min jødiske reise Cappelen ( (1982)
- Gunnar S. Gundersen Stenersen (1982)
- Vår tids skjebnedrama: Krig og fred i atomalderen (red.) Aschehoug (1982)
- Øst-Europa etter Polen Den Norske Atlanterhavskomité (1983)
- Min jødiske krig Cappelen (1983)
- Finland: Det muliges kunst Cappelen (1983)
- Det hendte også her Cappelen (1984)
- Ustasja Cappelen (1984)
- Øst-Europa og det tyske spørsmål Den Norske Atlanterhavskomité (1984)
- Befolkningsbomben: Overbefolkning, krig og fred Cappelen (1985) (Skrevet sammen med Arne Fjørtoft og Thor Heyerdahl).
- Russland, Russland Cappelen (1985)
- Anti-semittismens spøkelse Ansgar (1985)
- Sovjetunionens utenrikspolitikk: Geografi eller ideologi? Universitetsforlaget (1985)
- Sovjetunionen og Norden: Konfrontasjon eller naboskap? Cappelen (1986)
- Inn i Amerika Cappelen (1987)
- Også dette er Amerika Cappelen (1988)
- Sigøynernes Holocaust Cappelen (1989)
- Amerika rundt Cappelen (1989)
- Vandringer med Kåre Tveter Stenersen (1990)
- Amerika fra hav til hav Cappelen (1990)
- Skumring i Øst. Rasisme og nasjonalisme i det nye Europa Aschehoug (1991)
- Sannhetens likkiste? Gulfkrigen og media Aschehoug (1991)
- Jon Bøe Paulsen. Blant mennesker og landskap Hjarrand (1992)
- Eikaas og Ibsen: samtaler med kunstneren Den norske bokklubben (1992)
- Johs. Rian Grøndahl Dreyer (1994, with Gunnar Groven and Magne Malmanger).
- Det «hellige» Russland: Et essay om religion og nasjonalisme i øst Aschehoug (1995)
- Folket som ingen vil ha. Forfølgelsen av sigøynerne i Øst-Europa Aschehoug (1995)
- Ludvig Eikaas, 1981
- Lutefisk. Tradisjon – tilberedning – tilbehør, 1997
- Reisebrev fra det andre Tyskland, 1997
- Erindringer fra en stor og en liten verden, 1999–2004
- Tyskland i oppbrudd: Reisebrev fra vest Aschehoug (1998)
- Praha Millennium (1998) (Millenniums norske reisebøker)
- Den alltid aktuelle Peer Gynt. Spillet om Peer Gynt, eller Peer Gynt som musikkdramatisk kasteball Stiftelsen Peer Gynt (1999) (Skrevet sammen med Eyvind Solås)
- Berlin Millennium (1999) (Millenniums norske reisebøker)
- I grenseland: Erindringer fra en stor og en liten verden Aschehoug (1999)
- Kald krig og varme vennskap: Erindringer fra en stor og en liten verden Aschehoug (2000)
- Medier, makt og mennesker: Erindringer fra en stor og en liten verden Aschehoug (2001)
- Den brune fare: Høyreekstremisme og rasisme i det nye Europa Aschehoug (2002)
- Alle byers mor: Historier om Praha og landet omkring Damm (2003)
- Klippfisk – bacalao: Kulturhistorisk kokebok Damm (2003)
- Amsterdam Millennium (2003) (Millenniums norske reisebøker)
- Hjem til Europa? Sentral- og Øst-Europa i EU og NATO Aschehoug (2004)
- St. Petersburg Millennium (2005) (Millenniums norske reisebøker)
- De mest forfulgte av de forfulgte: Sigøynerne på Balkan (småskrift) Bjørnstjerne Bjørnson-akademiet (2005)
- Den tyske pasient: Besk medisin for Europas viktigste land Aschehoug (2006)
- Ettertanker (sammen med Berthold Grünfeld) (2007)
- Verden på nettet: kommentarer på nrk.no 2001-2008 (2008)
- Mitt liv med Moder Russland (2009)
- Hastverk når vi elsker Juritzen Forlag (2012)[12][13]
- Kunstnervenner (2013)[14]
- Drømmen om Europa : Streiftog i tidligere jernteppeland Dreyers Forlag (2014)[15]
- Marie og hennes elsker : Jakten på mitt opphav Aschehoug (2017)[16]

Media offices
Preceded by Arve Solstad	Chief editor of Dagbladet; 1977–1984 (joint with Arve Solstad throughout the period, and Roald Storsletten until 1980)	Succeeded by Arve Solstad
Awards
Preceded by Hans Normann Dahl, Vivian Zahl Olsen	Recipient of the Cappelen Prize; 1982 (shared with Bjørg Vik)	Succeeded by Richard Herrmann, Otto Øgrim, Helmut Ormestad, Kåre Lunde
