= The Lion Woman =

2006 novel by Erik Fosnes Hansen

The Lion Woman (in Norwegian: Løvekvinnen) is a novel by the Norwegian writer Erik Fosnes Hansen. It was published in 2006, and a film adaptation was released in 2016.

== Story ==
The book tells the story of Eva Arctander, who was born with hypertrichosis, which causes an abnormal amount of hair growth over the body. The novel describes her life from birth until the age of 13 or 14. She is examined by doctors in a degrading manner and bullied at school. She falls in love and experiences respect and disrespect. The book opens with her as part of a traveling theater group along with others with rare diseases or abnormalities. The book then goes back in time, and describing her experiences in relation to her condition and the people she meets. The book alternates between first-person and third-person narration.

== Reception ==
The book received very good reviews in many Norwegian newspapers. The author was praised for a well-written book and for his psychological insight. The audiobook edition, which was read by Fosnes Hansen himself, also received good reviews.

== Awards ==
2006: Norwegian Booksellers' Prize.

== Editions ==
- 2007: Cappelen Damm, paperback. ISBN 9788202281977
- 2006: Cappelen Damm, audiobook, read by Erik Fosnes Hansen. ISBN 9788202265878
- 2006: Cappelen Damm, hardcover. ISBN 9788202241353.
