= Rune Belsvik =

Norwegian writer (born 1956)

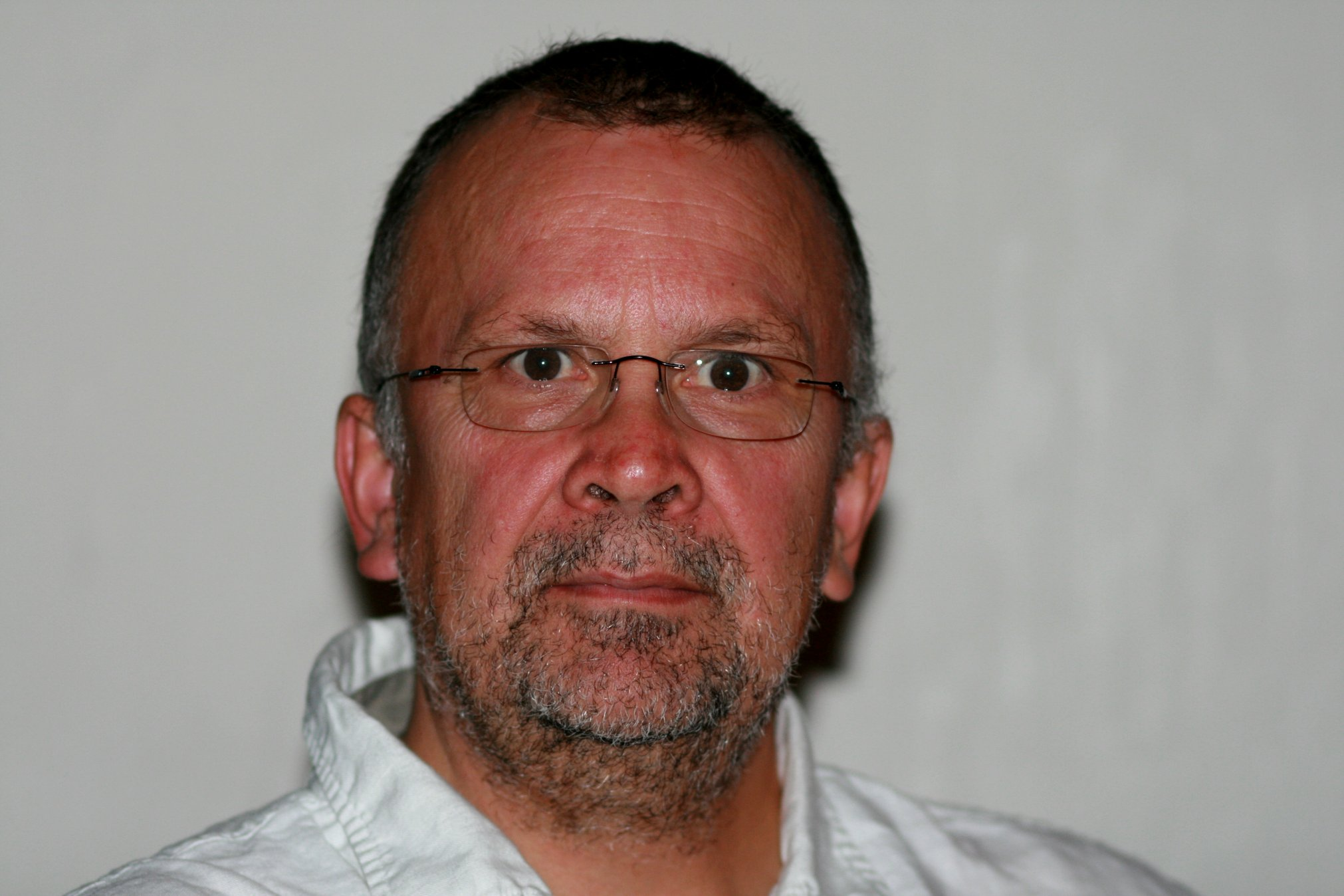
- Born: 14 April 1956 (age 70); Haugesund, Norway
- Occupations: Novelist, playwright, short story writer and children's writer
- Awards: Brage Prize (2000); Norwegian Critics Prize for Literature (1996 and 2001); Teskjekjerringprisen (2006)

Rune Belsvik (born 14 April 1956) is a Norwegian novelist, playwright, short story writer and children's writer.

== Biography ==
Belsvik was born on 14 April 1956 in Haugesund, and grew up in Stord Municipality. He has education in health care, and worked at a hospital in Kvinnherad Municipality until becoming a full-time writer in 1983.

He made his literary debut in 1979 with the children's book Ingen drittunge lenger. He was awarded the Brage Prize for Ein naken gut in 2000. He received the Norwegian Critics Prize for Children's Literature in 1996 for Dustefjerten og den store vårdagen, and again in 2001, for Verdens mest forelska par. He received the Cappelen Prize in 1984.

== Awards ==
- Brage Prize 2000
- Norwegian Critics Prize for Literature 1996 and 2001
- Teskjekjerringprisen 2006

Awards
Preceded by Richard Herrmann, Otto Øgrim, Helmut Ormestad, Kåre Lunde	Recipient of the Cappelen Prize; 1984 (shared with Lars Saabye Christensen, Ove Røsbak, Karin Sveen)	Succeeded by Kolbein Falkeid, Arvid Hanssen
Preceded by Erna Osland	Recipient of the Brage Prize for children and youth 2000	Succeeded by Anne B. Ragde
