= Gunnar Bull Gundersen =

Norwegian sailor, novelist, playwright and lyricist

- Born: 5 April 1929; Stavanger, Rogaland, Norway
- Died: 7 November 1993 (aged 64); Ramnes, Vestfold, Norway
- Education: Captain examinations at Oslo Public Seamen's School
- Occupations: Sailor, novelist, radiohost, playwright and lyricist.
- Spouse: Married twice
- Children: 2 daughters and 1 son
- Writing career
- Notable awards: Norwegian Critics Prize for Literature (1959); Riksmål Society Literature Prize (1961)

Gunnar Bull Gundersen (5 April 1929 – 7 November 1993) was a Norwegian sailor, novelist, playwright and lyricist.

== Biography ==
Gunnar Bull Gundersen was born at Stavanger in Rogaland, Norway. Gundersen grew up with changing foster parents and at different boarding schools. He referred to his young years as a very itinerant childhood and said he had visited 10 schools and been expelled from three of them. Shortly after World War II, he went to sea. He was welfare secretary in the State Welfare Office for the merchant navy (Statens Velferdskontor for Handelsflåten), where he was stationed in Antwerp, Rotterdam and Liverpool. He took the officer and later captain examinations at Oslo Public Seamen's School (Oslo Offentlige Sjømannsskole) in 1953 and sailed for some years as an officer in foreign trade. At one time he was also captain of the ferry between Nesodden and Oslo. While a newly qualified officer, he was hired as stage manager at the Radio Theatre for the Norwegian Broadcasting Corporation.

Gundersen was active in many fields. He was a theater director, novelist, playwright, emcee of radio and television, and wrote lyrics with jazz musicians or in concert with his friend and colleague, lyricist Harald Sverdrup (1923–1992). He also made an important contribution as an enthusiastic jazz communicates through a long series of radio programs in 1960 - 1970. In addition, he was a frequent contributor to the press.

In 1956, he made his literary debut with the novel Om natten – en bakgårdsfantasi. He was soon noticed for his sure sense of language and fanciful imagination, which would become his trademarks. Gundersen published twelve novels receiving positive reviews and earning several awards. Gundersen was awarded the Norwegian Critics Prize for Literature in 1959 for the novel Martin. For the stage, he wrote several plays and in collaboration with Jon Michelet (1944–2018) wrote Matros Tore Solem og hans skip (1979).

== Selected works ==
- Om natten – en bakgårdsfantasi (novel) 1956
- Martin (novel) 1959
- Judith; blader fra en kystskippers dagbok (novel) 1963
- En dagdrivers opptegnelser (short stories) 1966
- Han som ville male havet (novel) 1968
- De hjemløse (novel) 1977
- Matros Tore Solem og hans skip (play, with Jon Michelet) 1979

== Awards ==
- Norwegian Critics Prize for Literature (Kritikerprisen) - 1959
- Mads Wiel Nygaard's Endowment (Mads Wiel Nygaards legat) - 1960
- Riksmål Society Literature Prize (Riksmålsforbundets litteraturpris) - 1961
