= Vivian Zahl Olsen =

Norwegian illustrator

Vivian Zahl Olsen (born 24 January 1942) is a Norwegian artist, graphic designer and illustrator.

Vivian Zahl Olsen was educated at the Norwegian National Academy of Craft and Art Industry. She has contributed to several television series for the Norwegian Broadcasting Corporation, including Fru Pigalopp, Flode and Puslespill. She has also illustrated around seventy books, mostly for children.

She was awarded the Jacob Prize (Jacob-prisen) in 1980. She received the Cappelen Prize in 1981. Since 1992, she has been married to Per Haugan.

Awards
Preceded by Odd Eidem	Recipient of the Cappelen Prize; 1981 (shared with Hans Normann Dahl)	Succeeded by Bjørg Vik, Jahn Otto Johansen
