= Per Arneberg =

Norwegian poet, prosaist and translator (1901–1981)

- Born: 4 January 1901; Tønsberg
- Died: 9 October 1981 (aged 80)
- Occupations: Poet, prosaist and translator
- Awards: Riksmål Society Literature Prize (1971)

Per Arneberg (4 January 1901 – 9 October 1981) was a Norwegian poet, prosaist and translator, born in Tønsberg.

Among his books are Dagen og natten (1939), Oslostreif (1949) and Oktobernetter (1971). He edited the poetry anthology Norsk lyrikk. Mellomkrigstiden (1966).

He was awarded the Riksmål Society Literature Prize in 1971.
