= Pedro Carmona-Alvarez =

Chilean-Norwegian novelist, poet and musician

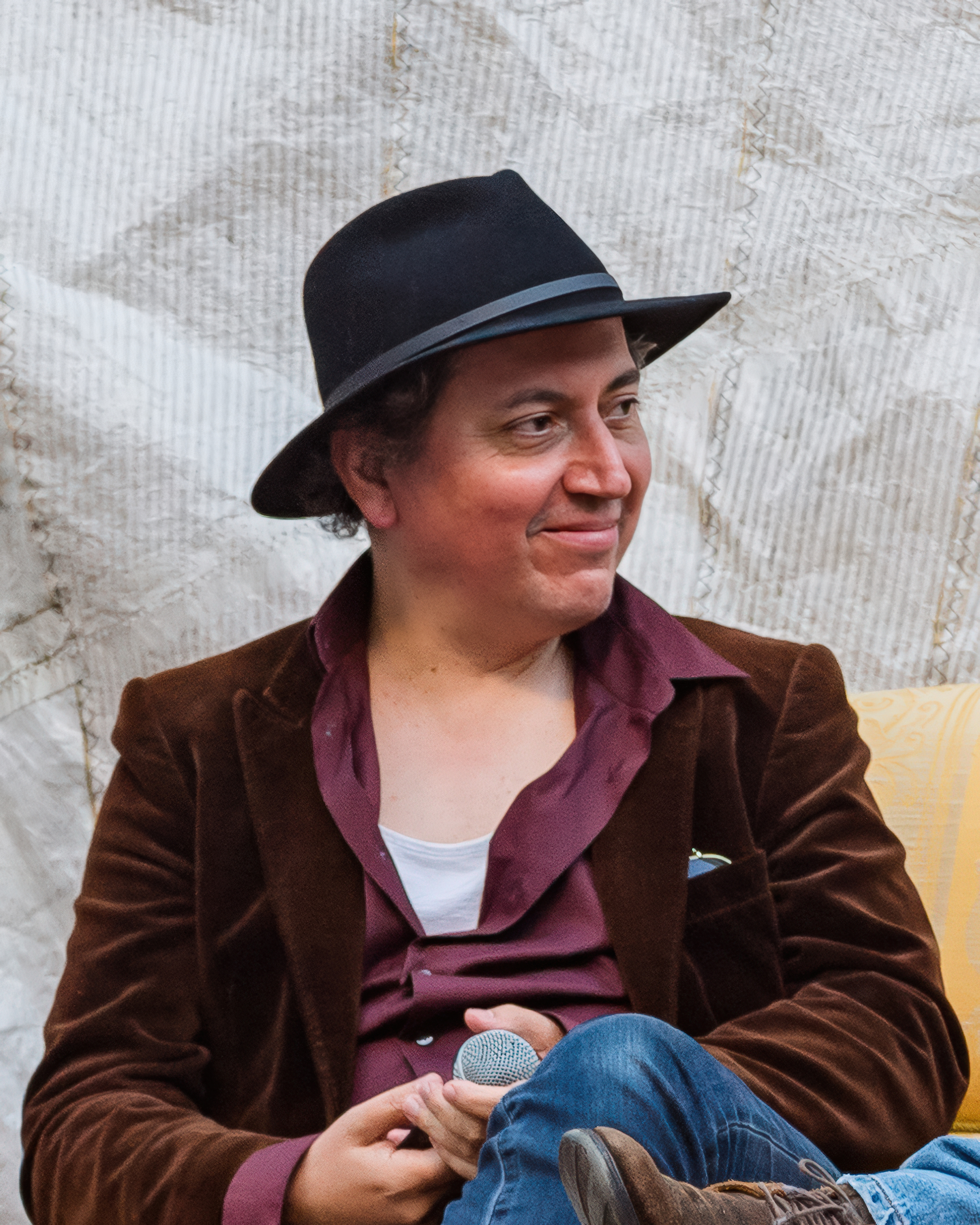
Pedro Carmona-Alvarez during a literature talk at Canal Street festival 2017

Pedro Carmona-Alvarez (born 15 February 1972) is a Chilean / Norwegian novelist, poet and musician.

== Career ==
Carmona-Alvarez made his literary debut in 1997 with the poetry collection Helter. Among his novels are La det bare bli blåmerker igjen from 2000 and Rust from 2009. He was awarded the Cappelen Prize in 2004. He received the Riksmål Society Literature Prize in 2023 for the novel Chiquitita.

== Personal life ==
Carmona-Alvarez was born on 15 February 1972 in La Serena, Chile. A refugee with his family in Argentina as a child, he later settled in Norway.
