= Roy Jacobsen =

Norwegian author (1954–2025)

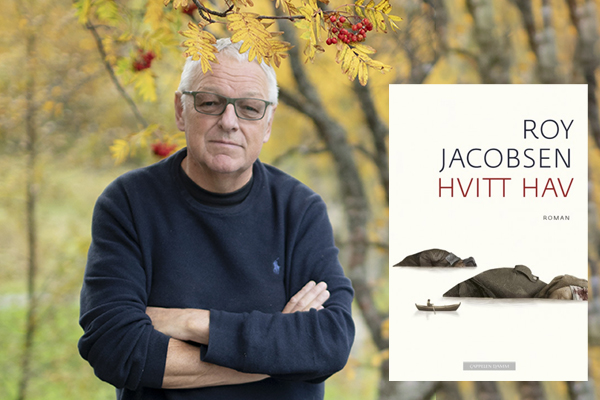
Jacobsen in 2022

Roy Jacobsen (26 December 1954 – 18 October 2025) was a Norwegian novelist and short-story writer. Born in Oslo, he made his publishing début in 1982 with the short-story collection Fangeliv (Prison Life), which won Tarjei Vesaas' debutantpris. He won the Norwegian Critics Prize for Literature and the Gyldendal Prize. Two of his novels have been nominated for The Nordic Council's Literature Prize: Seierherrene (The Conquerors) in 1991 and Frost in 2004. Several of his books have been translated into English. The Unseen was shortlisted for the International Booker Prize in 2017 and he was twice shortlisted for the International Dublin Literary Award.

== Life and career ==
Jacobsen grew up in a suburb of Oslo located in the Groruddalen valley. In his teens, Jacobsen was a member of the criminal "Årvoll gang". At age 16 he was arrested by the police and kept in solitary confinement for 35 days. He was subsequently convicted of among other things weapons offences and theft, and given a six-month suspended sentence.

He held a number of occupations, even after his debut as a writer in 1982. From 1990 he was a full-time author. Between 1979 and 1986 he lived at his mother's homestead at Solfjellsjøen in Dønna Municipality in the northern Norwegian county of Nordland, and both his mother's background and his own upbringing in Groruddalen were central themes of his breakthrough novel Seierherrene in 1991. He was a member of the Norwegian Academy for Language and Literature.

Jacobsen lived in Oslo in the later decades of his life. He died from complications of surgery on 18 October 2025, at the age of 70.

== Bibliography ==
- Fangeliv – short stories (1982)
- Hjertetrøbbel – novel (1984)
- Tommy – novel (1985)
- Det nye vannet – novel (1987) (English 1997: The new water)
- Virgo – novel (1988)
- Det kan komme noen – short stories (1989)
- Ursula – barnebok (1990)
- Seierherrene – novel (1991)
- Fata Morgana – novel (1992)
- Den høyre armen – short stories (1994)
- Trygve Bratteli. En fortelling – biography of Trygve Bratteli (1995)
- Ismael – novel (1998)
- Grenser – novel (1999) (English 2015: Borders)
- Fugler og soldater – short stories (2001)
- Det nye vinduet – short stories (2002)
- Frost – novel (2003)
- Hoggerne – novel (2005) (English 2007: The Burnt-Out Town of Miracles)
- Marions slør – novel (2007)
- Vidunderbarn – novel (2009) (English 2011: Child Wonder)
- De Usynlige – novel (2013) (English 2016: The Unseen)
- Hvitt hav – novel (2015) (English 2019: White Shadow)
- Rigels øyne – novel (2017) (English 2020: Eyes of the Rigel)
- På randen av Vigeland – autobiography (2019)
- Mannen som elsket Sibir – novel (2019)
- Bare en mor – novel (2020) (English 2022: Just a Mother)
- De uverdige – novel (2022)

== Prizes ==
- Tarjei Vesaas' debutantpris 1982, for Fangeliv
- Cappelen Prize 1987
- Notabeneprisen 1988
- Kritikerprisen 1989, for Det kan komme noen
- Bokhandlerprisen 1991, for Seierherrene
- Scheiblers legat 1991
- Ivar Lo-prisen 1994
- Oslo bys kunstnerpris 1994
- Riksmålsforbundets litteraturpris 2003
- Gyldendalprisen 2005
- Ungdommens kritikerpris 2006
- International Dublin Literary Award shortlist 2009 for The Burnt-Out Town of Miracles
- International Booker Prize shortlist 2017 (with translators Don Bartlett and Don Shaw) for The Unseen
- International Dublin Literary Award shortlist 2018 for The Unseen

Awards
Preceded by Inger Margrethe Gaarder, Fredrik Skagen	Recipient of the Cappelen Prize; 1987 (shared with Håvard Rem)	Succeeded by Ingvar Ambjørnsen
