= Fredrik Wandrup =

Norwegian journalist and writer

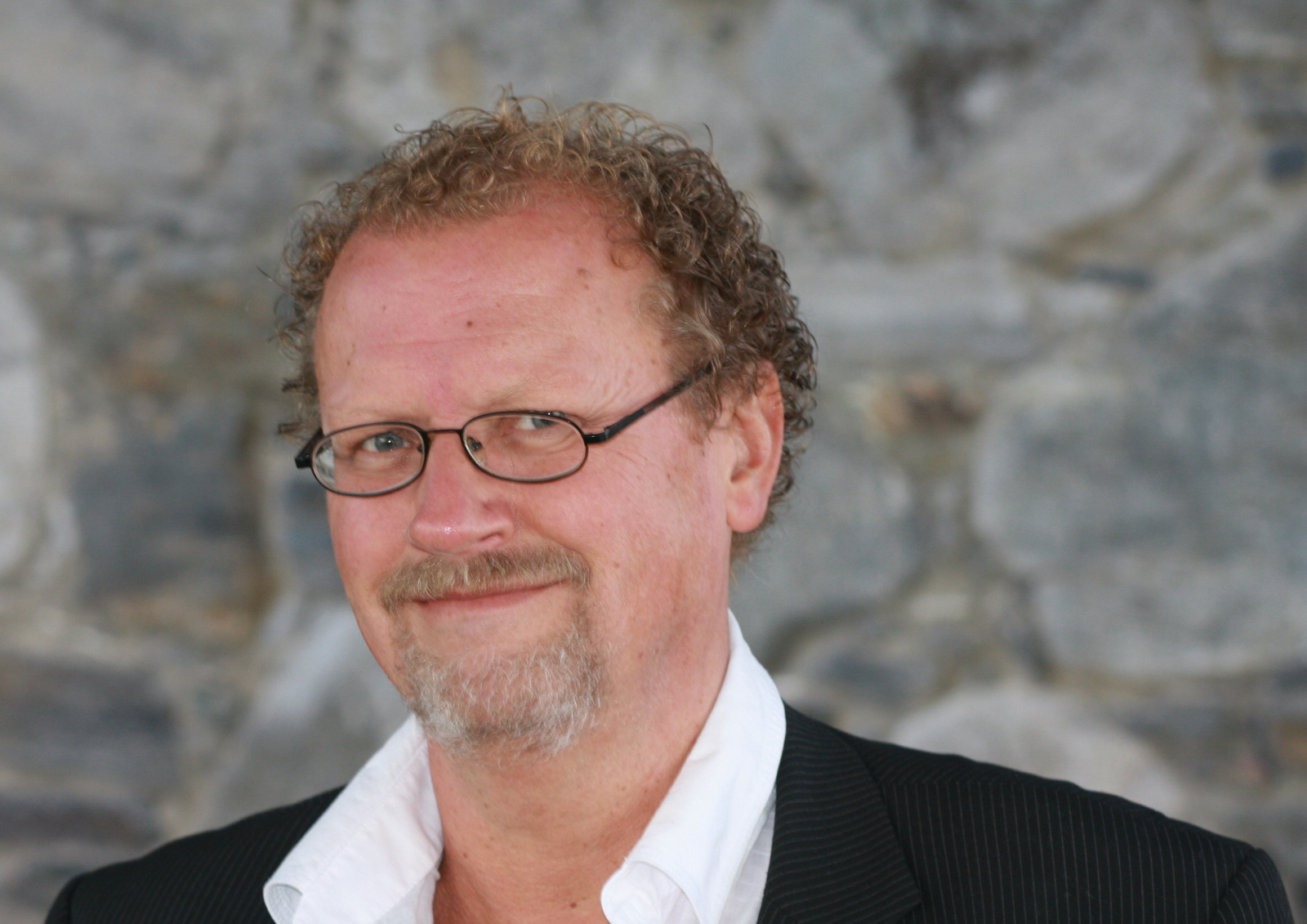
Fredrik Wandrup at Domkirken in Stavanger 2009

Fredrik Wandrup (born 1 March 1951) is a Norwegian journalist and writer. He has been affiliated with Dagbladet since 1976, and won the Riksmål Society Literature Prize in 1995.
