= Hans Normann Dahl =

Norwegian artist (1937–2019)

- Born: 7 October 1937; Lørenskog, Norway
- Died: 29 January 2019 (aged 81)
- Education: Norwegian National Academy of Craft and Art Industry
- Occupations: Illustrator, painter and sculptor
- Awards: Cappelen Prize

Hans Normann Dahl (7 October 1937 – 29 January 2019) was a Norwegian illustrator, painter and sculptor.

Dahl was educated at the Norwegian National Academy of Craft and Art Industry from 1952 to 1957 and the Academy of Fine Arts in Warsaw from 1965 to 1966. Dahl made his debut at the Autumn Exhibition at Oslo in 1957. He delivered illustrations the newspaper Dagbladet from 1967 to 1988. He also illustrated a number of books including Snekker Andersen og Julenissen by Alf Prøysen (Schoenhofsforeign Books. 1971).

He is represented at the National Museum of Art, Architecture and Design, at Bergen Museum and at the National Gallery in Warsaw. He received the Cappelen Prize in 1981, shared with Vivian Zahl Olsen.

Awards
Preceded by Odd Eidem	Recipient of the Cappelen Prize; 1981 (shared with Vivian Zahl Olsen)	Succeeded by Bjørg Vik, Jahn Otto Johansen
