= Maskeblomstfamilien =

2003 novel by Lars Saabye Christensen

- Author: Lars Saabye Christensen
- Language: Norwegian
- Genre: Fiction, Suspense
- Publication date: January 1, 2003
- ISBN: 978-8-202-23511-6

Maskeblomstfamilien is a novel by the Norwegian author Lars Saabye Christensen. Maskeblomstfamilien was published in 2003 by Cappelen. The novel is told by a troubled boy, Adrian, in first person narrative. At the age of 12, Adrian is faced with the suicide of his father and the emotional abandonment of his mother who draws into herself following her husband's death. Adrian's untrustworthy aunt becomes the main supporter of the family and takes on the responsibility of caring for the child. Between the ages of 12 and 17, Adrian deals with the discovery of multiple secrets his parents had been hiding from him, including the secret of his hermaphroditism, all while trying to find where he fits in the world in terms of his identity. Through these struggles, he treats his peers as outcasts just as he himself gets treated.
