= Richard Herrmann (journalist) =

Norwegian journalist, writer and radio personality

Fritz Richard Herrmann, MBE (11 September 1919 – 14 June 2010) was a Norwegian journalist, writer and radio personality.

Born and raised in Larvik, Herrmann graduated in 1939, and subsequently studied philology at University of Oslo. In 1941 he was offered a job with Norsk Telegrambyrå, an offer he reluctantly accepted, as it required all new employees to join Nasjonal Samling. He left the company after a few weeks. In 1952, he was employed by the Reuters newsagency in London, where he stayed until 1964. From 1961 he was the editor for Reuters UK operation. From 1964 to 1977 he was employed by the Norwegian Broadcasting Corporation as their correspondent in London. He later worked in Norway and was charged with developing the new radio channel NRK P2 in the early 1980s. In 1984 he retired from radio and TV, but he continued to write until he was almost 75 years old. He has written numerous books on Britain, British history and the British people, published in several languages.

After retiring, Herrmann spent the remainder of his life in Oslo, where he died after a long, unspecified illness on 14 June 2010, at age 90.

== Bibliography ==
- 1967 Over til London (Over to London)
- 1968 Paradisveien (Paradise road)
- 1970 Bak den svarte døren (Behind the black door)
- 1972 Under Big Ben (Beneath the Big Ben)
- 1976 Da ballen ble rund (When the ball became round)
- 1976 Kvinner for freden (Women for the peace)
- 1983 Mine gleders by (The city of my joys)
- 1985 Seks skudd ved stengetid (Six shots at closingtime)
- 1986 Livet med Elisabeth (Life with Elisabeth)
- 1987 Victoria: en dronning for sin tid (Victoria: a queen for her time)
- 1988 Maria Stuart
- 1990 Gammel krone for ny tid (Old throne for new times)
- 1991 En dikter fra Stratford (A writer from Stratford)
- 1992 Med skjebnen i hånden (With destiny in their hands)
- 1993 Fotballen: Den alvorlige leken (Football: The serious game)

== Honours ==
- MBE, Honorary Membership of the order of the British Empire
- 1967 The Narvesen Prize on literature
- 1969 The Norwegian Booksellers' Prize
- 1974 The radiolisteners prize of honour
- 1983 The Cappelen Prize.
- 1988 Riksmål Society Literature Prize

Awards
Preceded by Arne H. Halvorsen	Recipient of the Narvesen Prize; 1967	Succeeded by Arve Solstad and Per Egil Hegge
Preceded by Bjørg Vik, Jahn Otto Johansen	Recipient of the Cappelen Prize; 1983 (shared with Otto Øgrim, Helmut Ormestad, Kåre Lunde)	Succeeded by Rune Belsvik, Lars Saabye Christensen, Ove Røsbak, Karin Sveen
