= Kolbein Falkeid =

Norwegian writer (1933–2021)

Kolbein Falkeid (19 December 1933 – 27 June 2021) was a Norwegian poet and lyricist. He was one of the most widely read contemporary Norwegian poets; known for a lyrical poet's voice that is at once philosophical and approachable.

== Biography ==
Kolbein Falkeid was born in Haugesund, Norway. From 1962 onwards, he published over thirty titles, including his play The Terrorists (1980), which has been performed in Bergen, Norway at Den Nationale Scene, as well as in Japan, New York City, and Tel Aviv. Falkeid retired from a longstanding position teaching Norwegian language and literature at a public school in his hometown of Haugesund on the West Coast of Norway. Earlier he taught Norwegian literature at the University of Münster (Westfälische Wilhelms University) in Münster, Germany from 1963 to 1966. Falkeid served on the Research Council of Norway in 1974 and on the Literary Council of the Norwegian Authors' Union from 1978 to 1984. He served on the Norwegian Language Council since 1978 and on the advisory board of the Norwegian Directorate of Public Libraries from 1984.

Falkeid reached a large Norwegian audience both through his own poetry collections and through his collaboration with the Norwegian band Vamp, who used a number of his texts for their songs' lyrics. Kolbein Falkeid published Norwegian language translations of poems by a wide, international array of poets such as Pablo Neruda, Octavio Paz, Leopold Senghor, Nicanor Parra, D.H. Lawrence and Lawrence Ferlinghetti. Falkeid was represented by Norwegian publisher J.W. Cappelens Forlag.

== Awards ==
Honors include Norway’s foremost artistic grant, Statens Store Arbeidsstipendium, since 1978; the Cappelen Award, 1985; the Swedish Academy’s Dobloug Prize, 1993; the Stavanger Aftenblad Cultural Award, 1994; the Prøysen Award, 1996; the title of Bergen International Festival Poet of the Year, 1998; the Herman Wildenvey Poetry Award, 2001; and the Norwegian Brage Prize, 2011.

== Selected works ==
- Gjennom et glass-skår (1962)
- Vi (1966)
- Dissonans (1968)
- Reisenotater (1973)
- Afrika, mitt Afrika (1974)
- Horisontene (1975)
- Léopold Sédar Senghor: Senghors sanger (1976)
- Opp- og utbrudd (1978)
- Vagabondering (1979)
- Noen skritt unna (1980)
- Terroristene (1980)
- Redningsforsøk (1983)
- De andre (1983)
- Nå (1983)
- Trekket vestover : utvalgte dikt forord av Paal-Helge Haugen (1984)
- Gledepunkter (1985)
- Kaffekjelens vinger (1988)
- En annen sol (1989)
- Bølgelengder : dikt i utvalg ved Paal-Helge Haugen (Bokklubbens lyrikkvenner, 1991)
- Cappelen (1993)
- Gjest (1995)
- Utrøstelig bøddel (1997)
- De store strendenes samtale : dikt i utvalg ved Paal-Helge Haugen (1998)
- Torv : slit og trivsel på Haugalandet (Lokalhistorisk stiftelse, 1998)
- Haugalandet : ferd i folk og natur (Wigestrand forlag, 1999)
- Enslige utsikter (2000)
- Utestengt (2001)
- Vind, eple (2003)
- Samlede dikt (2003)
- Utvalgte dikt, ved Paal-Helge Haugen (2005)

Awards
Preceded by Lars Saabye Christensen, Rune Belsvik, Ove Røsbak, Karin Sveen	Recipient of the Cappelen Prize; 1985 (shared with Arvid Hanssen)	Succeeded by Inger Margrethe Gaarder, Fredrik Skagen
