= Riksmål Society Literature Prize =

Norwegian literary award

The Riksmål Society Literature Prize (Riksmålsforbundets litteraturpris) is awarded annually by the Riksmålsforbundet for the outstanding publication in riksmål. The prize was awarded until 2002 by the Oslo and Bærum Riksmål League, when it was taken over by the Riksmålsforbundet.

== Prize winners ==
- 1957 – Terje Stigen
- 1958 – Harald Grieg
- 1959 – Emil Boyson
- 1960 – Odd Eidem
- 1961 – Gunnar Bull Gundersen
- 1962 – Solveig Christov
- 1963 – André Bjerke
- 1964 – Odd Hølaas
- 1965 – Rolf Jacobsen
- 1966 – Karin Bang
- 1967 – Hallvard Rieber-Mohn
- 1968 – Ebba Haslund
- 1969 – Olav Nordrå
- 1970 – Finn Carling
- 1971 – Per Arneberg
- 1972 – Bjørg Vik
- 1973 – Aasmund Brynildsen
- 1974 – Jens Bjørneboe
- 1975 – Stein Mehren
- 1976 – Astrid Hjertenæs Andersen
- 1977 – Peter R. Holm
- 1978 – Knut Faldbakken
- 1979 – Åge Rønning
- 1980 – Henrik Groth
- 1981 – Jan Bull
- 1982 – Sissel Lange-Nielsen
- 1983 – Odd Abrahamsen
- 1984 – Ernst Orvil
- 1985 – Harald Sverdrup
- 1986 – Carl Fredrik Engelstad
- 1987 – Kjell Askildsen
- 1988 – Richard Herrmann
- 1989 – Gunvor Hofmo
- 1990 – Erik Fosnes Hansen
- 1991 – Kaj Skagen
- 1992 – Paal Brekke
- 1993 – Tove Nilsen
- 1994 – Tor Åge Bringsværd
- 1995 – Fredrik Wandrup
- 1996 – Bergljot Hobæk Haff
- 1997 – Lars Saabye Christensen
- 1998 – Ketil Bjørnstad
- 1999 – Ingvar Ambjørnsen
- 2000 – Toril Brekke
- 2001 – Britt Karin Larsen
- 2002 – Olav Angell
- 2003 – Roy Jacobsen
- 2004 – Anne B. Ragde
- 2005 – Erland Kiøsterud, for Det første arbeidet (The First Work)
- 2006 – Egil Børre Johnsen, for Unorsk og norsk. Knud Knudsen: En beretning om bokmålets far
- 2007 – Jan Christopher Næss, for Det begynner med sex og ender med døden (It Starts With Sex and Ends With Death)
- 2008 – Dag Olav Hessen, for Natur? Hva skal vi med den? (Nature? What Shall We Do With It?)
- 2009 – Rune Christiansen, for Krysantemum
- 2010 – Peter Normann Waage, for Leve friheten! Traute Lafrenz og Den hvite rose
- 2011 – Not awarded
- 2012 – Terje Holtet Larsen, for Dilettanten
- 2013 – Ragnar Kvam Jr., for Mannen og mytene
- 2014 – Odd Klippenvåg, for Ada
- 2015 – Terje Emberland, for Da fascismen kom til Norge.
- 2016 – Tom Egeland, for Djevelmasken
- 2017 – Ingvild Burkey, for Et underlig redskap, and Frid Ingulstad
- 2018 – Simon Stranger, for Leksikon om lys og mørke
- 2019 – Sverre Mørkhagen, for IBSEN ... den mærkelige Mand
- 2020 – Karin Fossum, for Bakom synger døden
- 2021 – Lars Vik, for Bjørg Viks vei
- 2022 – Nina Lykke, for Vi er ikke her for å ha det morsomt
- 2023 – Pedro Carmona-Alvarez, for Chiquitita
- 2024 – Maria Kjos Fonn, for Margaret, er du i sorg
- 2025 – Birger Emanuelsen, for Odysseen
- 2026 – Anders Heger, for the biography Wanda
