= Lars Saabye Christensen =

Norwegian/Danish author

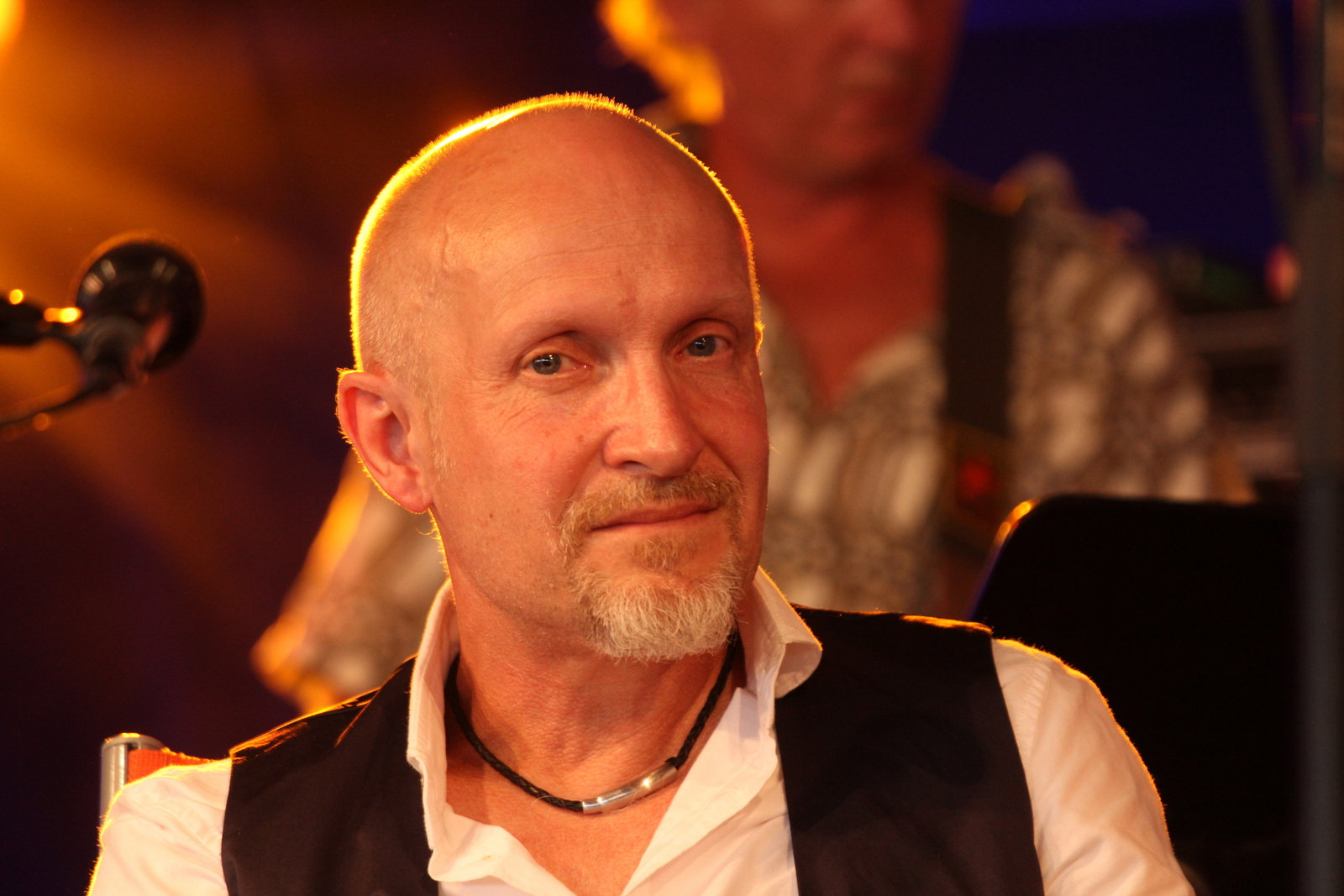
- Lars Saabye Christensen in 2013.
- Born: 21 September 1953 (age 72); Oslo, Norway
- Occupation: Author
- Writing career
- Period: 1976–present
- Genres: Drama, poetry, novels and children's books

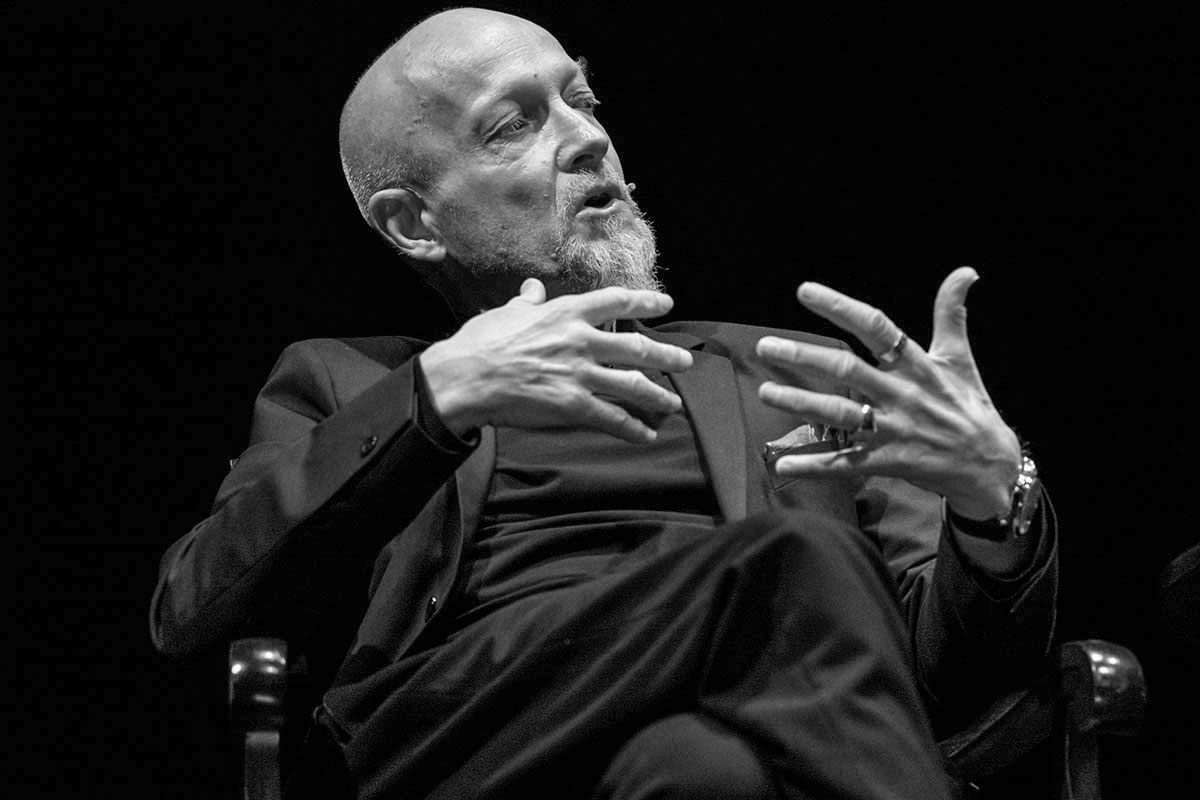
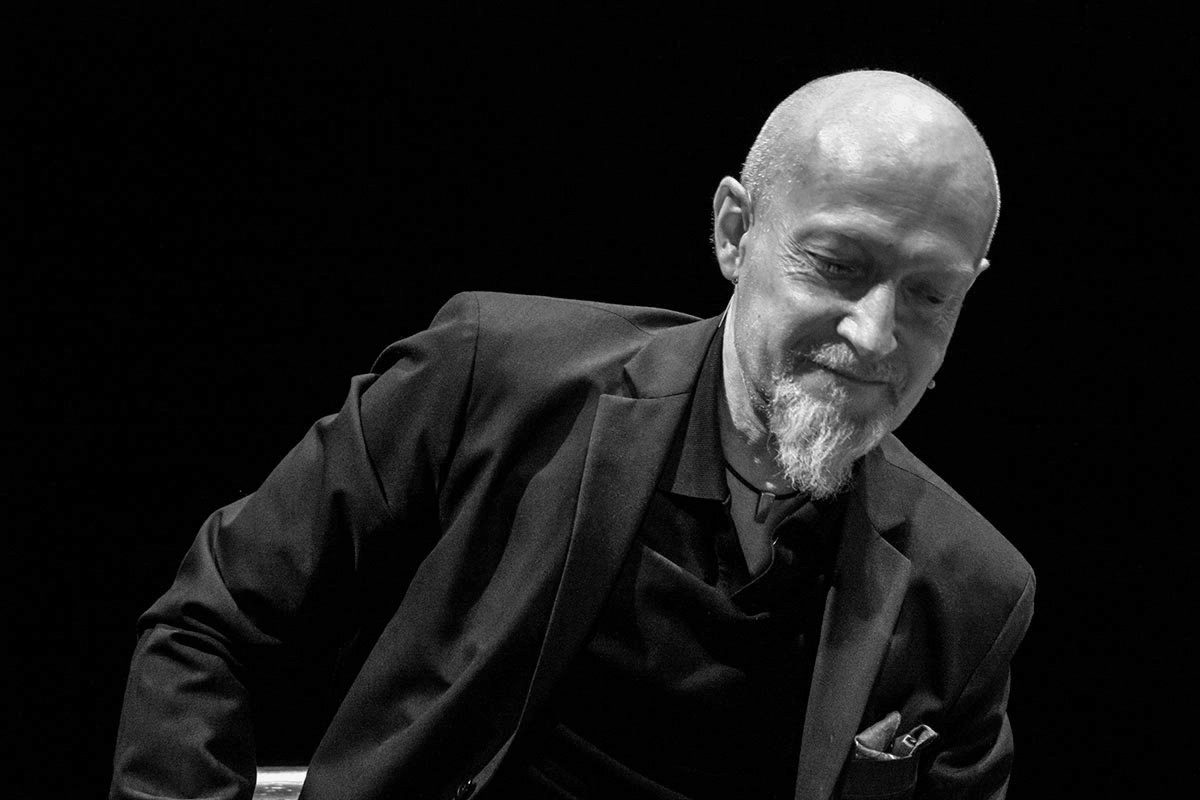
LiteratureXchange Festival
Aarhus/Denmark 2022
Photo Hreinn Gudlaugsson

Lars Saabye Christensen (born 21 September 1953 in Oslo) is a Norwegian-Danish author.

Saabye Christensen was raised in the Skillebekk neighbourhood of Oslo, but lived for many years in Sortland Municipality in northern Norway; both places play a major role in his work. He lives in Blindern, the university district of Oslo.

He is half Danish and holds Danish and Norwegian citizenship.

== Career ==
Saabye Christensen studied literature, Norwegian, art history and the history of ideas at university. He made his début in 1976 with a collection of poems entitled Historien om Gly, which won Tarjei Vesaas' debutantpris for that year's best Norwegian literary début, but he had published a poem collection, titled Grønt lys (Green light), when he was 19 years old, and had also published many poems in an underground literary publication called Dikt og Datt.

He has written numerous poems and plays, and several film scripts, but is best known as a novelist. His first novel was published the year after Historien om Gly and titled Amatøren (The Amateur). Among his most noted works are the novels Beatles (1984) (for which he won the Cappelen Prize) and Halvbroren (The Half Brother, 2001) (for which he won the Brage Prize, two other Norwegian literary awards, and The Nordic Council's Literature Prize, and which was shortlisted for the 2005 International Dublin Literary Award). Other notable books by Saabye Christensen are Herman, Gutten Som Ville Være En Av Gutta, Maskeblomstfamilien and Modellen. Between 2017 and 2019, he released a trilogy titled Byens spor (The Traces of a City), in which all three books were met with critical acclaim, while simultaneously being treated for a spinal disc herniation and bone marrow cancer.

Since 1993 he has issued 4 recordings of his poetry as a member of the band Norsk Utflukt: Med lyset på (1993), Diger og gul (1997), Det blå arret (2002) and Tida som går (2004).

On 24 October 2006, he was made a Commander of the Royal Norwegian Order of St. Olav. In April 2008, he was made a Chevalier dans L'ordre des Arts et Lettres (Knight of the Order of Arts and Literature) by the French Government. In 2018, he was awarded an honorary Amanda award for his contribution to Norwegian culture. He is a member of the Norwegian Academy for Language and Literature.

His novel Sluk was adapted by Bent Hamer for the 2021 film The Middle Man.

== Bibliography ==
- Historien om Gly – poetry (1976)
- Amatøren – novel (1977)
- Kamelen i mitt hjerte – poetry (1978)
- Jaktmarker – poetry (1979)
- Billettene – novel (1980)
- Jokeren – novel (1981) (English 1991: The Joker)
- Paraply – poetry (1982)
- Beatles – novel (1984) (English 2001: Beatles, translated by Don Bartlett)
- Blodets bånd – novel (1985)
- Åsteder – poetry (1986)
- Colombus ankomst – play (1986)
- Sneglene – novel (1987)
- Herman – novel (1988) (English 2005: Herman)
- Stempler – poetry (1989)
- Vesterålen – poetry (1989)
- Bly – novel (1990)
- Gutten som ville være en av gutta – novel (1992)
- Ingens – novella (1992)
- Den akustiske skyggen – poetry (1993)
- Mekka – drama (1994)
- Jubel – novel (1995)
- Den andre siden av blått. Et bildedikt fra Lofoten og Vesterålen. – poetry (1996) (English 1997: The Other Side of Blue: Pictures and Poems from Lofoten and Vesterålen)
- Den misunnelige frisøren – novel (1997)
- Noen som elsker hverandre – novella (1999)
- Pasninger – poetry (1999)
- Falleferdig himmel – poetry (1998)
- Kongen som ville ha mer enn en krone children's book (1999)
- Under en sort paraply – poetry (1999)
- Mann for sin katt – children's book (2000) (illustrated by Rune Johan Andersson)
- Pinnsvinsol – poetry (2000)
- Halvbroren – novel (2001) (English 2001: The Half Brother)
- Maskeblomstfamilien – novel (2003)
- Sanger og steiner – poetry (2003)
- SATS – novella (2003)
- Oscar Wildes heis – novella (2004)
- Modellen – novel (2005) (English 2007: The Model, translated by Don Bartlett)
- Norske omveier - i blues og bilder - poetry (2005)
- Saabyes cirkus – novel (2006)
- Den arktistike drømmen - picture book (2007)
- Ordiord - (2007) (illustrated by Rune Johan Andersson)
- Bisettelsen - novel (2008).
- Visning - novel (2009)
- Men buicken står der fremdeles - poetry (with Tom Stalsberg, illustrated by Lars Eivind Bones) (2009)
- Bernhard Hvals forsnakkelser - novel (2010)
- Sluk - novel (2012)
- Stedsans - novella (2013)
- Magnet - novel (2015)
- De nye reglene – poetry (2017)
- Byens spor - novel, first in a trilogy (2017)
- Byens spor: Maj - novel, second in a trilogy (2018)
- Byens spor: Skyggeboken - novel, third and final in a trilogy (2019)
- Byens bokstaver - poetry (2020)
- Min kinesiske farmor - family portrait (2020)
- En tilfeldig nordmann - novel (2021)

== Awards and prizes ==
- Tarjei Vesaas' debutantpris 1976, for Historien om Gly
- Cappelenprisen 1984
- Rivertonprisen 1987, for Sneglene
- Norwegian Critics Prize for Literature 1988, for Herman
- Sarpsborgprisen 1988
- Bokhandlerprisen 1990, for Bly
- Amandaprisen 1991
- Dobloug Prize 1993
- Riksmålsforbundets litteraturpris 1997
- Sarpsborgprisen 1999
- Aamot-statuetten 2001
- Bokhandlerprisen 2001, for Halvbroren
- Brage Prize 2001, for Halvbroren
- Den norske leserprisen 2001, for Halvbroren
- The Nordic Council's Literature Prize 2002, for Halvbroren
- Shortlisted for the International Dublin Literary Award in 2005 for Halvbroren
- Chevalier dans L'ordre des Arts et Lettres 2008

Awards
Preceded by Ingvar Moe	Winner of Tarjei Vesaas' debutantpris 1976	Succeeded by Bjarne Rønning
Preceded by Richard Herrmann, Otto Øgrim, Helmut Ormestad, Kåre Lunde	Recipient of the Cappelen Prize; 1984 (shared with Rune Belsvik, Ove Røsbak, Karin Sveen)	Succeeded by Kolbein Falkeid, Arvid Hanssen
