= Tom Stalsberg =

Norwegian journalist and writer

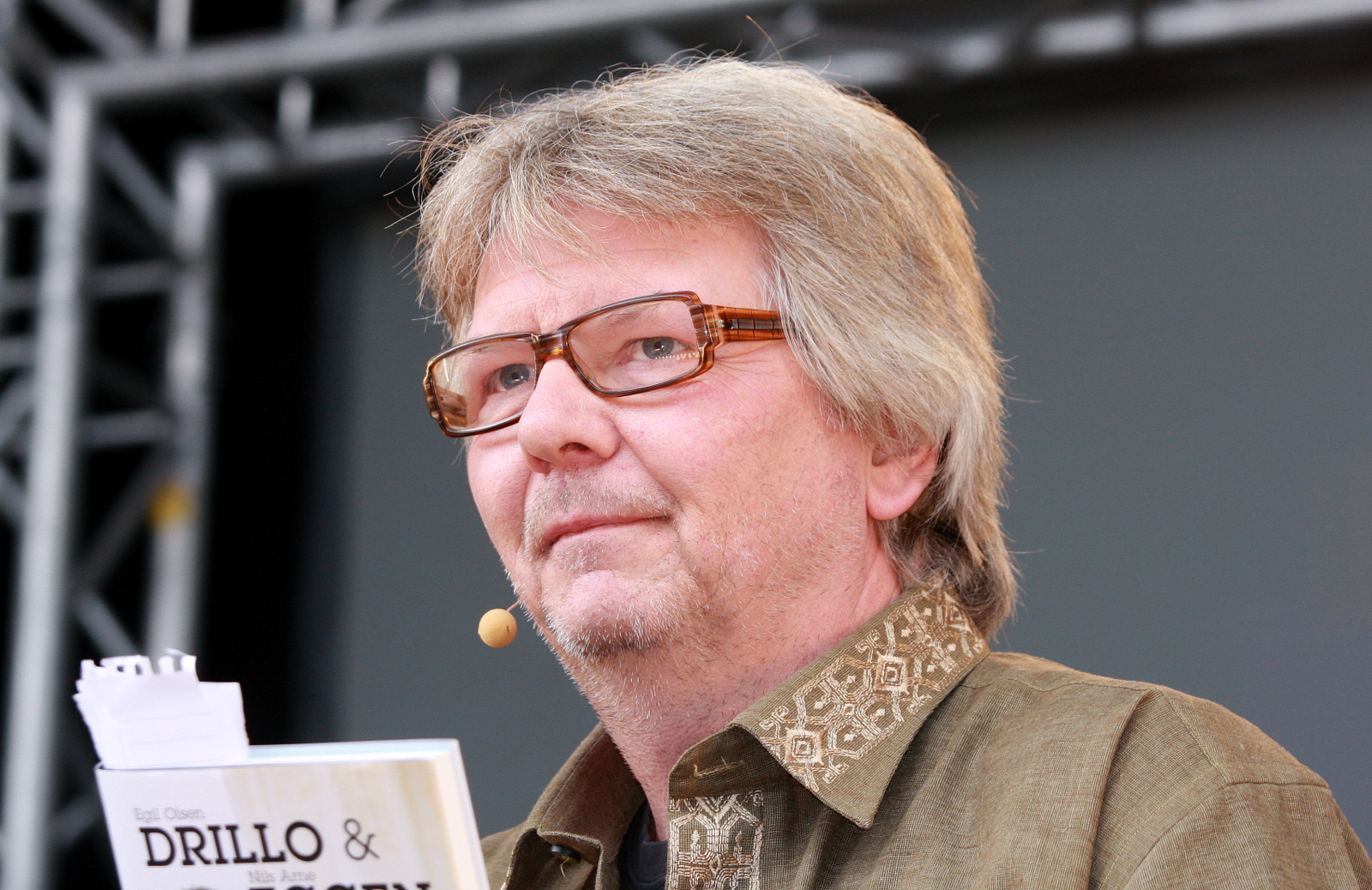
Tom Stalsberg

Tom Stalsberg (born 1957) is a Norwegian culture journalist, sports journalist (for Dagbladet) and lyricist.

Among his poetry collections are The Electric Blue Café (Aschehoug 2009), Men Buicken står her fremdeles (Aschehoug 2010, with Lars Saabye Christensen), Min Buick er lastet med (Aschehoug 2012, with Lars Saabye Christensen), All right, himmelen (Aschehoug 2015) and Leilighetsdikt for hjemløse (Cappelen Damm 2018, with Ingvar Ambjørnsen).

Among his sports books are Verdens rundeste ball about Norway Cup (1997, with Tom Grønvold and Jan L. Dahl), To esler i Blackpool (Cappelen Damm 2005), VM i fotball 2014 (Cappelen Damm 2014, with Jon Michelet, Morten Pedersen and Dag Solstad) as well as books on Cristiano Ronaldo, Ole Gunnar Solskjær, and Lionel Messi.
