= Per Egil Hegge =

Norwegian journalist (1940–2023)

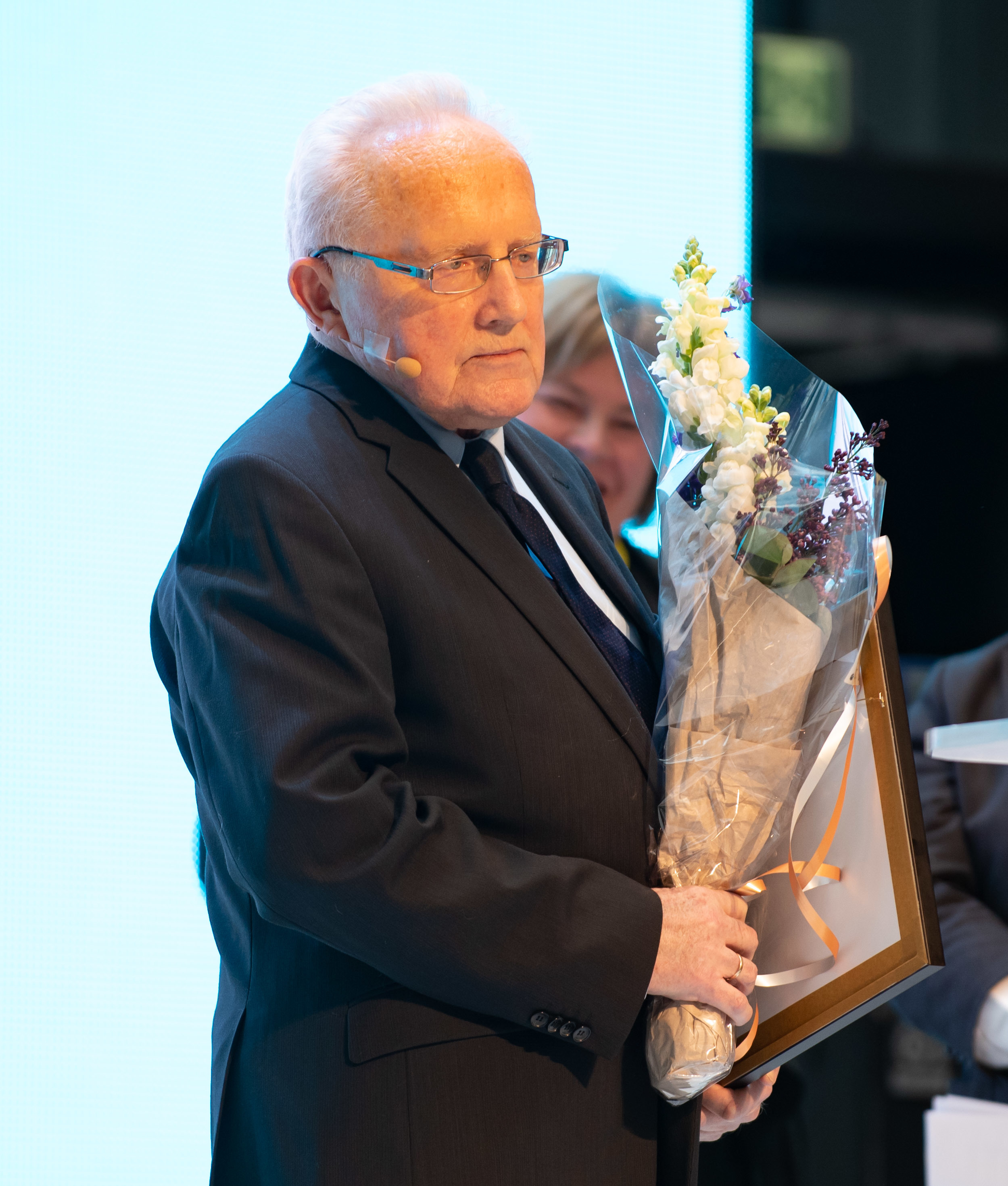
- Born: Per Egil Hegge; 6 March 1940; Trondheim, Norway
- Died: October 2023 (aged 83)
- Occupation: Journalist

Per Egil Hegge (6 March 1940 – October 2023) was a Norwegian journalist.

== Life and career ==
Per Egil Hegge was born in Trondheim as a son of two teachers from Skatval Municipality. The family moved to Inderøy Municipality in 1941.

Hegge served his military service at the elite Russian language program of the Norwegian Armed Forces. He started his career in the Norwegian News Agency, and was hired in Aftenposten in 1962 and remained there for the rest of his career. He was the newspaper's London correspondent from 1963 to 1965, and then worked in Norway (winning the Narvesen Prize in 1968) before becoming Moscow correspondent from 1969 to 1971. He was then expelled from the country, one of the reasons for this being that he was the first journalist to interview Aleksandr Solzhenitsyn after he won the Nobel Prize in Literature in 1970. After another six years in Norway from 1971 to 1977 Hegge was the Washington DC correspondent from 1977 to 1981. He was then subeditor before editing Aftenposten's magazine A-magasinet from 1984 to 1988. From 1992 to 1998 he was the cultural editor. He retired in 2005, but continued to have a column about the correct use of language. When it comes to perceptions of the Norwegian language quality development, Hegge has been called a "housegod of the dissatisfied" by literary critic Aage Borchgrevink.

Hegge chaired the Norwegian branch of PEN-International from 1985 to 1988. He wrote several books, starting with world affairs, and later about the correct use of language and other popular releases. He also wrote biographies of Otto Sverdrup (in 1996), Fridtjof Nansen (in 2002) and Harald V of Norway (in 2006). His Nansen biography was translated into Armenian in 2007. Hegge was also a popular lecturer.

In 2003 he was decorated with the Royal Norwegian Order of St. Olav (Knight 1st Class). He died in October 2023, at the age of 83.

Awards
Preceded by Richard Herrmann	Recipient of the Narvesen Prize; 1968 (shared with Arve Solstad)	Succeeded by Kai Otto Hansen
