= Fredrik Skagen =

Norwegian writer (1936–2017)

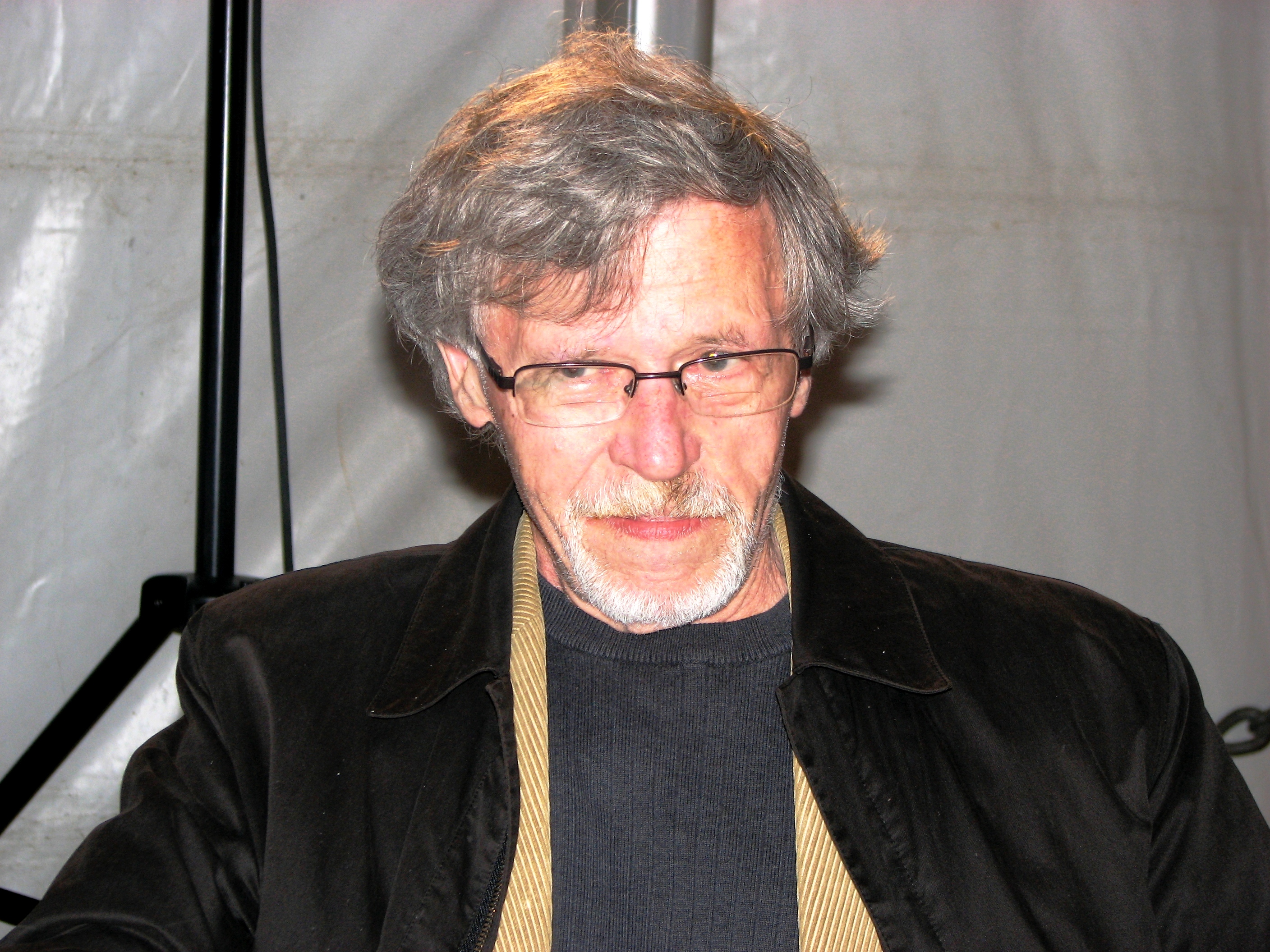
Fredrik Skagen in 2010.

Fredrik Skagen (30 December 1936 – 20 June 2017) was a Norwegian writer.

He was born in Trondheim. He is best known for his crime fiction, but is also the author of some children's books and several radio plays. His first book was published in 1968. His works have been translated into German, Danish, Swedish, Dutch and French.

Skagen has received several awards, including the Norwegian Booksellers' Prize in 1985 and the Glass Key Award in 1996 for best Nordic crime novel.

== Works ==
Skagen is known for writing books such as Purpurhjertene: Rapporter fra en Vietnamsoldat (Purple Hearts: Reports of a Vietnam Soldier), Voldtatt (Raped), God Natt, Elskede (Good Night, Darling), and Viktor! Viktor!.

Awards
Preceded by Kolbein Falkeid, Arvid Hanssen	Recipient of the Cappelen Prize; 1986 (shared with Inger Margrethe Gaarder)	Succeeded by Roy Jacobsen, Håvard Rem
