= Ove Røsbak =

Norwegian writer

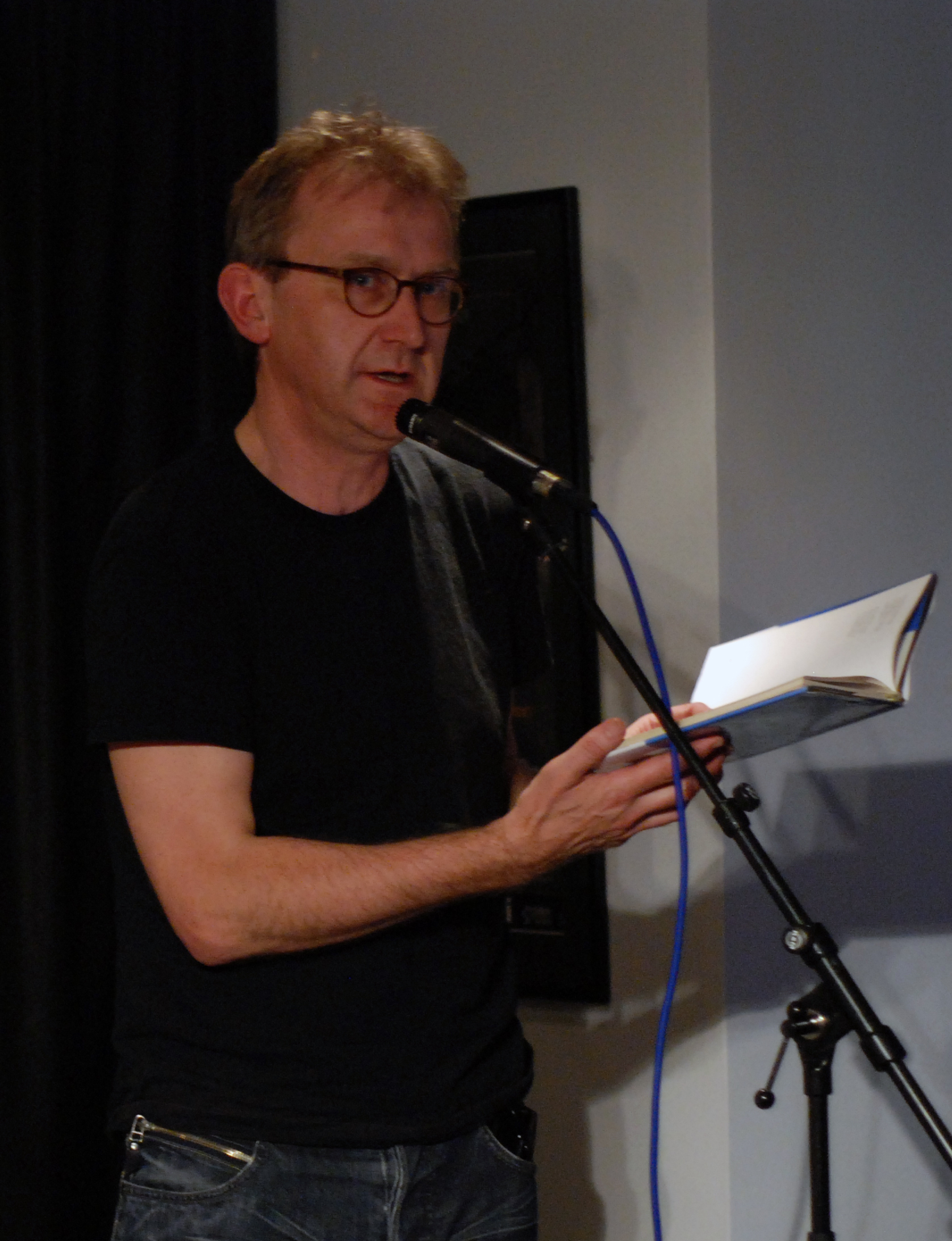
- Ove Røsbak
- Born: 5 August 1959 (age 67); Furnes, Norway
- Occupations: Poet, novelist, children's writer and biographer
- Notable work: Alf Prøysen and Rolf Jacobsen

Ove Røsbak (born 5 August 1959) is a Norwegian poet, novelist, children's writer and biographer.

He made his literary debut in 1977 with the poetry collection Lævandes dikt. He has written biographies on Alf Prøysen and Rolf Jacobsen.

He received the Cappelen Prize in 1984.

== Bibliography ==
- Living Poems - poetry collection (1978)
- Karlsvogn and Pottisjord - poetry collection (1979)
- Barefoot - on Bone Floor - poetry collection (1980)
- Aue in May - poetry collection (1981)
- In Between Houses - short story collection (1984)
- The Troll Stone - children's book (1984), later adapted into a film
- Now You Draw the Night Curtain - poetry collection (1985)
- Just Before - novel (1987)
- The Third Man - novel (1990)
- The Moon and the Tortoise - children's book (1990)
- Alf Prøysen: Prestvægen and the Seven Stars - biography (1992)
- The Gnome on the Hill - children's book (1994)
- Astronaut in the Stomach Room - poetry collection (1995)
- Old Grey in Blue Mountain - children's book (1996)
- Rolf Jacobsen: A Poet and His Shadow - biography (1998)
- Midway - poetry collection (2000)
- Margaret: The Queen of the North - novel (2002)
- When Time Comes; poetry collection (2008)
- Flashlight Boy (2009)
- Sorrow Dances on the River in Morning Sunlight (2011)

Awards
Preceded by Richard Herrmann, Otto Øgrim, Helmut Ormestad, Kåre Lunde	Recipient of the Cappelen Prize; 1984 (shared with Lars Saabye Christensen, Rune Belsvik, Karin Sveen)	Succeeded by Kolbein Falkeid, Arvid Hanssen
