= Beatles (novel) =

1984 novel by Lars Saabye Christensen

First edition (publ. J.W. Cappelens Forlag)

Beatles is a novel written by the Norwegian author Lars Saabye Christensen. The book was first published in 1984. It takes its title from the English rock band The Beatles, and all the chapters are named after Beatles songs or albums. The book tells the story of four Oslo boys in the years from 1965 to 1972, recapitulating their adolescent years and early adulthood. The boys have a common interest - worship of the Beatles, and take on the names of the group members, John, Paul, George and Ringo. Each of them shares some characteristics with the chosen member.

== Plot ==
The main character and storyteller, Kim Karlsen (Paul), is writing the entire story in flashbacks from a sheltered and closed summer residence in Nesodden Municipality. He has recently escaped from the asylum of Gaustad in Oslo. He rewrites his story from the spring of 1965 to the present day (winter 1972-1973).

Kim and his friends, Gunnar (John), Sebastian (George) and Ola (Ringo), played football together, collected Beatles records and stole attributes from cars. This last hobby was abandoned after an incident with an embassy car, and the entire collection was dumped in the fjord. Kim is known as a notorious liar, while Gunnar is the truth-seeker. Ola is the stuttering fat one, and Sebastian is a spiritualist. In time, Kim is the first to get a girlfriend, Nina, who is on and off over the years. The boys get involved in the Norwegian hippie movement in the late 1960s, experiment with drugs, and Sebastian gets so hooked the others have to look for him in Paris, where he lives the life of a junkie, but is saved by his friends (1968). Kim has a nervous breakdown and tells the end of his story from inside the asylum at the time of the 1972 Norwegian European Communities membership referendum. He escapes as the result is clear and retires to Nesodden for writing his story. The last we hear is from Nina, now pregnant with his child, before the book closes.

=== Political perspective ===
The four boys mature during the political struggle of the 1960s, and end up as left-wingers, inspired by people around them. The "upper class" mentality of the western Oslo society is evident, and Kim describes how his sentiments gradually shift to the left. Three characters in the book seem to be propagating this view:

- Gunnar's older brother, Stig. He presents them to "Masters of War" by Bob Dylan in the first chapter, making the boys conscious of the Vietnam War by telling them of the atrocities committed by American soldiers (including information on napalm). Stig's views change during the book, ending as an environmentalist leaning towards anarchism. He and Seb seem to be close at some points in the book.
- Henny, the young girlfriend of Kim´s uncle Hubert. She is an art student, and informs Kim about Edvard Munch, and explains to him the assault on the Kjartan Slettemark Vietnam picture in the summer of 1965, to which Kim is a witness (The picture was attacked and demolished with an axe). Kim later has nightmares about the incident, dreaming that the attacker uses his axe on innocent children. Henny is in Paris during the 1968 uprising, being attacked by the French police. The book tells how Kim sees her on television, being struck with batons. She even holds her hands around her head in the position of the Scream, to close the Munch metaphor (Kim thinks the picture, which he "hears", is of the mother of one of the Vietnam napalm victims). The "Scream" metaphor is a recurring motif in the book.
- Fred Hansen, a working class boy who managed to get into the upper class school the other boys attend. He is bullied by the other boys, and even the teachers, who disrespect his East end dialect. Gunnar and the others protect Fred, and on visiting him and his mother, Kim and the others learn of the contemporary social inequality in Oslo. Fred drowns in the summer of 1966, despite being the best swimmer in class. The others keep his memory alive. Fred was apparently born outside of wedlock, not knowing who his father was. His mother makes a living by cleaning houses.

=== Historical inaccuracies ===
The most notable historical inaccuracy in the original Beatles novel, is Kim's reaction and reflections around the picture of the Napalm Girl, mentioned as early as in the 1965 chapters, whereas the picture itself was taken in June 1972. To be charitable, the older Kim may have seen the picture that summer and blended it in with his adolescent memories, as the book closes in the spring of 1973.

== Sequels ==
Beatles had two sequels, Bly (Lead) in 1990, and Bisettelsen (The Funeral), in 2008.

=== Bly ===
The sequel Bly (1990), tells the story of Kim after he returns from Florence in 1974, a year after the end of Beatles. He meets Sebastian, now an underground poet, and Vivi, a girl from Holmenkollen. The story tells how Kim had his penis injured during a blowjob in Florence, where he played the piano (or so he says). Much of the story centers round Kim`s uncle Hubert, a con artist, who specializes in faking the great ones, like Picasso, while playing insane. When his scheme is revealed, he drowns himself at Bygdøy. Vivi is an art student, and much of the novel discuss relations between copies and originals.

At the end of the book, Kim has published a collection of poems with the help of Seb. It is evident that they worked on it together, but the identity of Kim and Seb blurs somewhat during the novel. Lars Saabye Christensen himself shows up early in the novel, reading one of his early poems to no avail at a poetry slam in Oslo.

=== Bisettelsen ===
Bisettelsen (The Funeral, 2008), tells the story of how Kim dies in January 2001, 49 years old. Here, the fates of the characters are revealed. Gunnar was connected to the left-wing movement Workers' Communist Party (AKP-(ml) in Norwegian) until the death of John Lennon in 1980. This incident changed the life of both Gunnar, Ola and Seb. Gunnar became an archaeologist, Seb a teacher, and Ola a hairdresser, like his father.

Kim is found naked and dead at a hotel room in Sortland, and his only relative is Nina, who took care of their daughter Eleanor (named after "Eleanor Rigby"), who is deaf from birth. The others are told by her of the death of Kim; they have received short letters from Kim, allegedly from Rongbuk. He claimed to have climbed Mount Everest. The story also reveals, among other things, that Kim had a sister, Kaja, who died early, and never mentioned afterwards. We also learn that Hubert, the supposed uncle, may be Kim's real father. And barely mentioned, that Kim really lived most of his life at a ward for mentally distorted, something even Gunnar denies at the end, trusting Kim´s Rongbuk postcard more than the asylum priest.

This book, like the first one, takes the chapter titles from Beatles' songs, but this book has chapters named solely from Magical Mystery Tour, a record totally absent from the original novel (except for "I Am the Walrus"). The "mystery tour" is Kim's journey through the land of the dead, referencing both Peer Gynt and Divina Commedia. Half of the novel is related by death himself (or herself), the other is related by "the other one", presumably the author. There is also the voice of Kim, through parts of his own manuscript, parts of which never reached the finished edition of Beatles. One presumed his mother edited them out.

Further references to Peer Gynt is given, as Kim himself is a notorious liar and poet, like Peer. His "Solveig" is Nina, who dwells in his "hut", the flat he grew up in, and keeping a symbolical "silver button" (like the one Peer gave to Solveig): in fact the Mercedes logo Kim snatched from a car at the very start of Beatles.
