= Helmut Ormestad =

Norwegian physicist (1913–1993)

Helmut Ormestad (12 May 1913 – 10 August 1993) was a Norwegian physicist and researcher at the University of Oslo, specializing in acoustics. In 1983, he was awarded the Cappelen Prize (a literary award) for co-writing the physics textbook series Rom Stoff Tid with fellow Norwegian physicists Otto Øgrim and Kåre Lunde.

Awards
Preceded by Bjørg Vik, Jahn Otto Johansen	Recipient of the Cappelen Prize; 1983 (shared with Otto Øgrim, Helmut Ormestad, Kåre Lunde, Richard Herrmann)	Succeeded by Lars Saabye Christensen, Rune Belsvik, Ove Røsbak, Karin Sveen
