= Roald Storsletten =

Norwegian newspaper editor

- Born: 9 February 1915; Bodø, Norway
- Died: 6 February 1991 (aged 75)
- Occupation: newspaper editor
- Known for: Chief editor of Dagbladet; Chair of the Association of Norwegian Editors

Roald Storsletten (9 February 1915 – 6 February 1991) was a Norwegian newspaper editor. He was chief editor of the newspaper Dagbladet for more than two decades, and chaired the Association of Norwegian Editors.

== Career ==
Born in Bodø on 9 February 1915, Storsletten was hired in the newspaper Dagbladet in 1940, was promoted to news editor in 1954 and served as chief editor from 1958 to 1980, from 1973 jointly with Arve Solstad, and from 1977 also together with Jahn Otto Johansen.

He chaired the Association of Norwegian Editors from 1966 ro 1971.

Storsletten died in Oslo on 6 February 1991, at the age of 75.

Media offices
Preceded by Gunnar Larsen	Chief editor of Dagbladet; 1959–1980 (joint with Helge Seip until 1965, Arve Solstad since 1973, Jahn Otto Johansen since 1977)	Succeeded by Arve Solstad; Jahn Otto Johansen
