= Stein Erik Lunde =

Norwegian novelist, children's writer, biographer and textbook writer

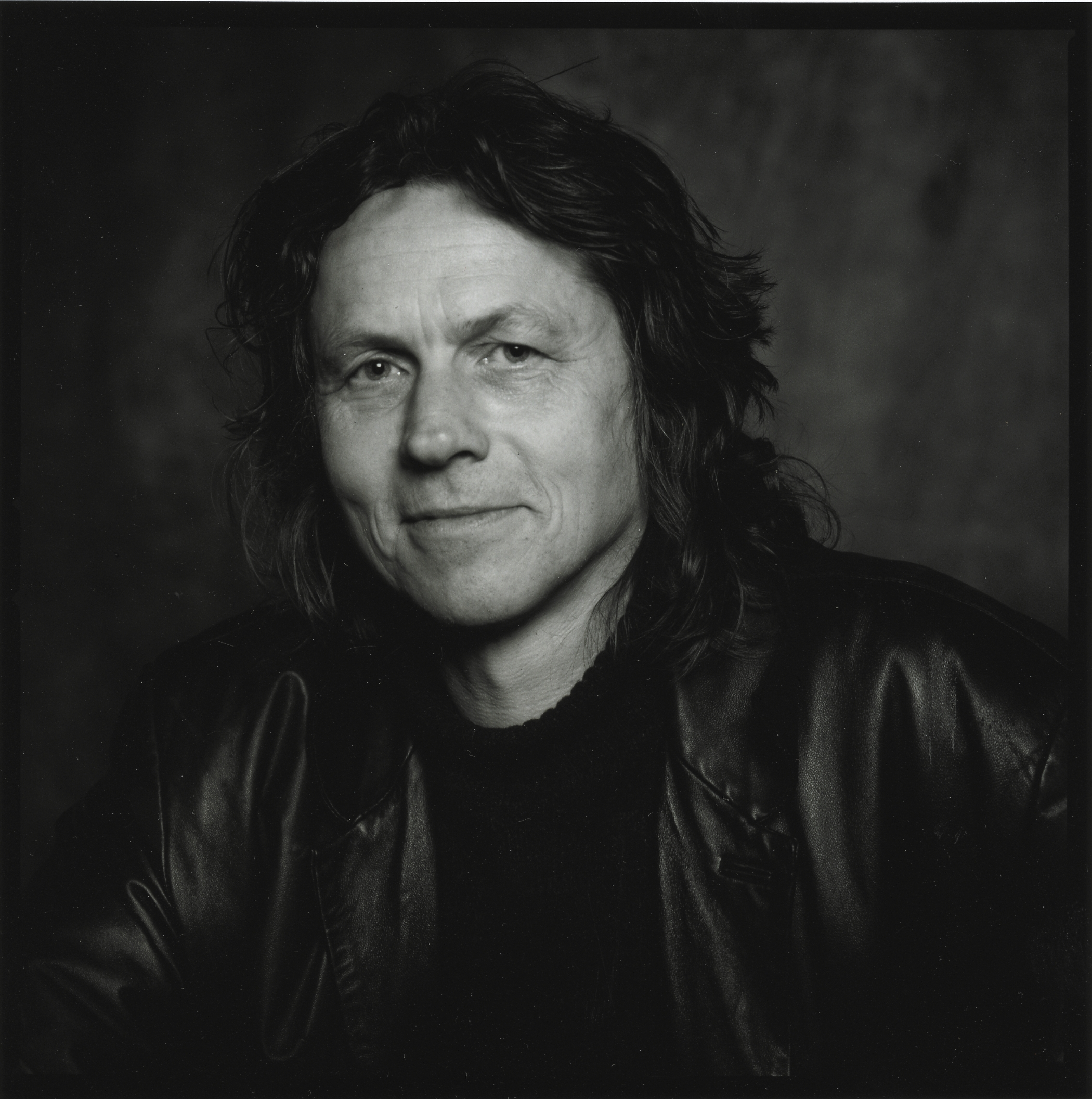
- Born: 22 November 1953 (age 72)
- Occupation: Writer
- Awards: Brage Prize (1998)

Stein Erik Lunde (born 22 November 1953) is a Norwegian novelist, children's writer, biographer and textbook writer.

Lunde made his literary debut in 1982 with the crime novel Ingenting ruster. He was awarded the Brage Prize in 1998 for the children's books Eggg. Among his later books are Ulv from 2004, En far from 2006, and Eg kan ikkje sove no from 2008.

In addition to being an author, Lunde also writes lyrics and has translated Bob Dylan into Norwegian.

Awards
Preceded by Harald Rosenløw Eeg	Recipient of the Brage Prize (children's literature); 1998	Succeeded by Erna Osland
