= Arvid Hanssen =

Norwegian writer (1932–1998)

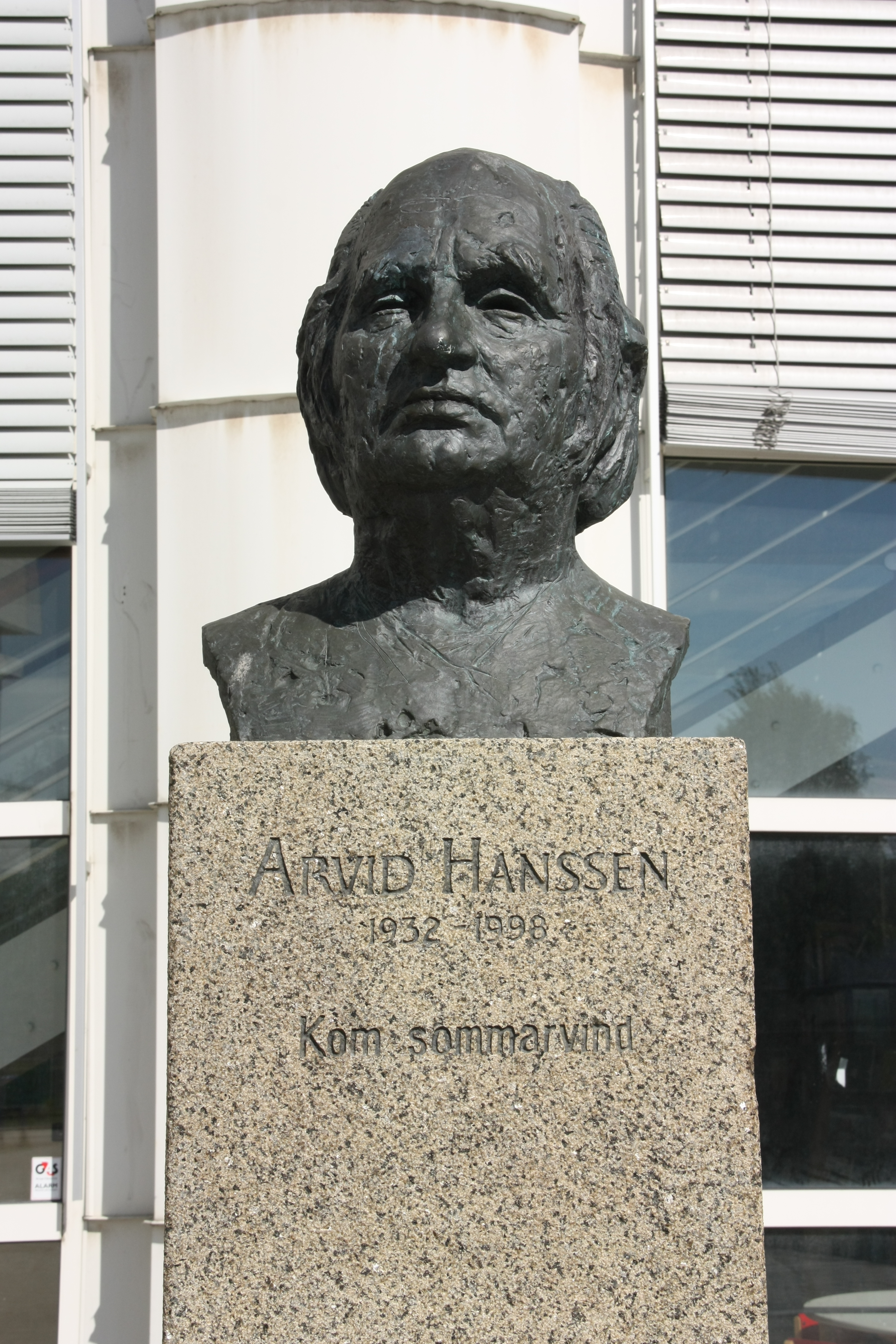
Arvid Hanssen's bust

Arvid Hanssen (28 July 1932 – 31 July 1998) was a Norwegian journalist, newspaper editor, poet, novelist and children's writer.

== Biography ==
Hanssen was born in Vika at Indre Senja in Troms county. He completed Finnsnes High School in 1948. He graduated from Moldenæs University College in Tromsø in 1951. Hanssen became as a journalist in 1957. He became the editor of the newspaper Senjens Blad from 1957 to 1962. From 1963 he was editor of the magazine Midnattsol. In 1972, Hanssen became a full-time author and song writer.

His songs reached a wide audience through Tove Karoline Knutsen's 1980 album Blå kveill, which was based on Hanssen's lyrics. He received a number of prizes, including the Prøysen Prize in 1982, The Fritt Ord Honorary Award in 1984, and the Cappelen Prize in 1985.

He was married in 1958 with Ingebjørg Langhaug. He was the father of freelance journalist Arne Ivar Hanssen and author Sigrid Merethe Hanssen. He died in Dyrøy Municipality in Troms. Lenvik Municipality named a road Arvid Hanssens plass after him. A bust of the writer is located outside the cultural centre in Finnsnes.

== Bibliography ==
=== Children's books ===
- 1972 Han Johannes and I (Norsk Barneblads forlag, Larvik)
- 1973 Kampen om Veslevågen (Norsk Barneblads forlag, Larvik)
- 1975 Den vonde vinteren: forteljing fra Nord-Noreg i 1930-åra (Norsk Barneblads forlag, Larvik)
- 1976 Randi til rors (Norsk Barneblads forlag, Larvik)
- 1977 Langt nord i verda (Norsk Barneblads forlag, Larvik)
- 1977 Året har mange dagar (Norsk Barneblads forlag, Larvik)
- 1978 Kaldt hav (Norsk Barneblads forlag, Larvik)
- 1979 For en ferietur! (Norsk Barneblads forlag, Larvik)
- 1980 Den store båra, a young adult novel (Cappelen, Oslo)
- 1983 Busserull-tider (Cappelen, Oslo)
- 1986 Topphuve-tider (Cappelen, Oslo)
- 1988 Jente-tider (Cappelen, Oslo)
- 1993 Trollmøte: tankebitar her og no (Cappelen, Oslo)

Awards
Preceded by Lars Saabye Christensen, Rune Belsvik, Ove Røsbak, Karin Sveen	Recipient of the Cappelen Prize; 1985 (shared with Kolbein Falkeid)	Succeeded by Inger Margrethe Gaarder, Fredrik Skagen
