= Åge Rønning =

Norwegian writer and journalist

- Born: 4 October 1925; Oslo, Norway
- Died: 31 January 1991 (aged 65)
- Occupations: Journalist, novelist
- Awards: Gyldendal's Endowment (1959); Riksmål Society Literature Prize (1979); Norwegian Critics Prize for Literature (1982); Dobloug Prize (1989)

Åge Rønning (4 October 1925 – 31 January 1991) was a Norwegian writer and journalist.

== Biography ==
Åge Rønning was born in Oslo, Norway. His parents were Normann Rønning (1888–1974) and Astrid Therese Nielsen (1895–1978). He graduated in 1944 at Vahl School. He had a career in journalism working for Verdens Gang 1945–47, Norsk Telegrambyrå 1947–54 and Morgenbladet until 1964. His debut novel Fotfeste for elskere was published in 1954. His writings often reflected his Roman Catholic faith and focused on related religious issues. From 1968 to 1969, Rønning was a deputy and from 1978 board member of the Norwegian Authors' Union. He was affected by multiple sclerosis starting in 1967 and was from 1980 depending on a wheelchair.

== Awards ==
- 1959- Gyldendal's Endowment (Gyldendals legat) jointly with Alf Larsen
- 1979 - Riksmål Society Literature Prize (Riksmålsforbundets litteraturpris)
- 1982 - Norwegian Critics Prize for Literature (Kritikerprisen) for the novel Kolbes reise
- 1989 - Dobloug Prize (Doblougprisen) from the Swedish Academy jointly with Eldrid Lunden

== Selected works ==
- Fotfeste for elskere (1954)
- Kvinnene (1957)
- Narrens krets (1960)
- De ukjentes marked (1966)
- Alle klovner (1971)
- Komedien om slottsherrene (1974)
- Fortsettelse i Hamburg (1987)
- Arvingen kommer torsdag (1981)
- Kolbes reise (1982)
