= Bjørg Vik =

Norwegian writer (1935–2018)

- Born: 11 September 1935; Oslo, Norway
- Died: 7 January 2018 (aged 82)
- Occupations: Journalist, novelist, short story writer and playwright
- Awards: Riksmål Society Literature Prize (1972); Aschehoug Prize (1974); Norwegian Critics Prize for Literature (1979); Cappelen Prize (1982); Dobloug Prize (1987); Ibsen Prize (1991)

Bjørg Vik (11 September 1935 – 7 January 2018) was a Norwegian novelist, short story writer, playwright, and journalist.

== Biography ==
Bjørg Turid Vik was born in Oslo, Norway. Her parents were Sverre Thorbjørn Johansen (1903–1958) and Anna Sofie Marcussen (1902–1987). She grew up in the neighborhood of St. Hanshaugen in Oslo. She completed her examen artium at Hegdehaugen School in 1954 and attended the Journalist Academy in Oslo from 1955 to 1956.

From 1956 to 1960, she was a journalist for the newspaper Porsgrunns Dagblad. She made her literary debut in 1963 with the short story collection Søndag ettermiddag. Further collections from the 1960s are Nødrop fra en myk sofa (1966) and Det grådige hjerte (1968). She also wrote five novels. Between 1988 and 1994 she published the semi-autobiographical Elsi Lund trilogy of novels about adolescence and maturity in postwar Oslo. The trilogy consists of Små nøkler store rom (1988), Poplene på St. Hanshaugen (1991), and Elsi Lund (1994). Vik also published a series of plays and children's books. Her works have been translated into approximately 30 languages.

In 1957, she married the architect Hans Jørgen Vik (1927–1995). She was a co-founder of the feminist magazine Sirene (1973–1983).

== Awards ==
Bjørg Vik was awarded the Riksmål Society Literature Prize in 1972, the Aschehoug Prize in 1974, and the Norwegian Critics Prize for Literature in 1979 for the short story collection En håndfull lengsel. She received the Dobloug Prize in 1987 and the Ibsen Prize in 1991. She received the Cappelen Prize in 1982, which she shared with Jahn Otto Johansen, who died six days before her own death. She was awarded the Amalie Skram Prize in 1996.

Awards
Preceded by Hans Normann Dahl and Vivian Zahl Olsen	Recipient of the Cappelen Prize; 1982 (shared with Jahn Otto Johansen)	Succeeded by Richard Herrmann; Otto Øgrim; Helmut Ormestad; Kåre Lunde
