= Jan Christopher Næss =

Norwegian writer (born 1964)

Jan Christopher Cockburn Næss (born 18 December 1964) is a Norwegian writer, known for his novels and children's literature.

He was born in Great Britain. His novels include Meg selv og mine kjære (1999), Jotapata (2001), Fiat (2004) and Det begynner med sex og ender med døden (2007). His children's books include Alexandria og de tre gåtene (2001), Stein og fossilene (2002), Selma og ballettmonsteret (2003), Puddingmannen (2004) and Puddingmannen og de tre søstrene som alle het noe på B (2006). He won the Riksmål Society Literature Prize in 2007.
