= Odd Eidem =

Norwegian writer, journalist and literary critic

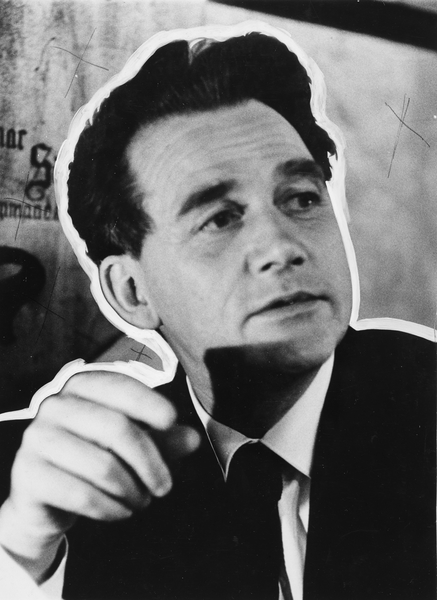
- Odd Eidem, 1961
- Born: 23 October 1913; Kristiania, Norway
- Died: 10 June 1988 (aged 74)
- Education: University of Oslo
- Occupations: Writer, journalist and literary critic
- Awards: Riksmål Society Literature Prize (1960); Norwegian Booksellers' Prize (1968); Norwegian Critics Prize for Literature (1978); Cappelen Prize (1980)

Odd Eidem (23 October 1913 – 10 June 1988) was a Norwegian writer, journalist and literary critic.

== Biography ==
He was born in Kristiania (now Oslo), Norway. He was the eldest of three sons born to Gunnar Kølbel (1890–1963) and Dorothea Serine Eidem (1889–1940). His parents divorced during his youth. He grew up in Hamar and received his artium in 1931. He earned a master's degree in literature history at the University of Oslo in 1938.

He debuted in 1939 as a fiction author. During the 1930s, he was an active member of the political movement Mot Dag. He worked as a secretary for Nansenhjelpen from 1938 to 1940. After World War II, Eidem became a literary critic at Verdens Gang, where he remained a regular contributor until 1977. From 1955 to 1977, he also wrote theater reviews. He wrote a column for Aftenposten from 1978 to 1988. His performances on radio can be heard on the CD collection Hørøretøret from the Gunnar Haugan NRK radio program Hørøret.

Eidem was awarded the Norwegian Critics Prize for Literature (Kritikerprisen) in 1978 for the flaneries, Cruise. He received the Cappelen Prize (Cappelenprisen) in 1980.

== Selected works ==
- Uten fane, 1939
- Kala, 1971
- Cruise, 1978
- Pieter og jeg, 1979
- Ute på veiene, 1980
- Morgen i Dibonne. Et landsbybilde, 1982
- Arons roser, 1985

== Awards ==
- Riksmål Society Literature Prize, 1960
- Norwegian Booksellers' Prize, 1968
- Norwegian Critics Prize for Literature, 1978

Awards
Preceded by Thorbjørn Egner	Recipient of the Cappelen Prize; 1980	Succeeded by Hans Normann Dahl and Vivian Zahl Olsen
