= Erik Fosnes Hansen =

Norwegian writer (born 1965)

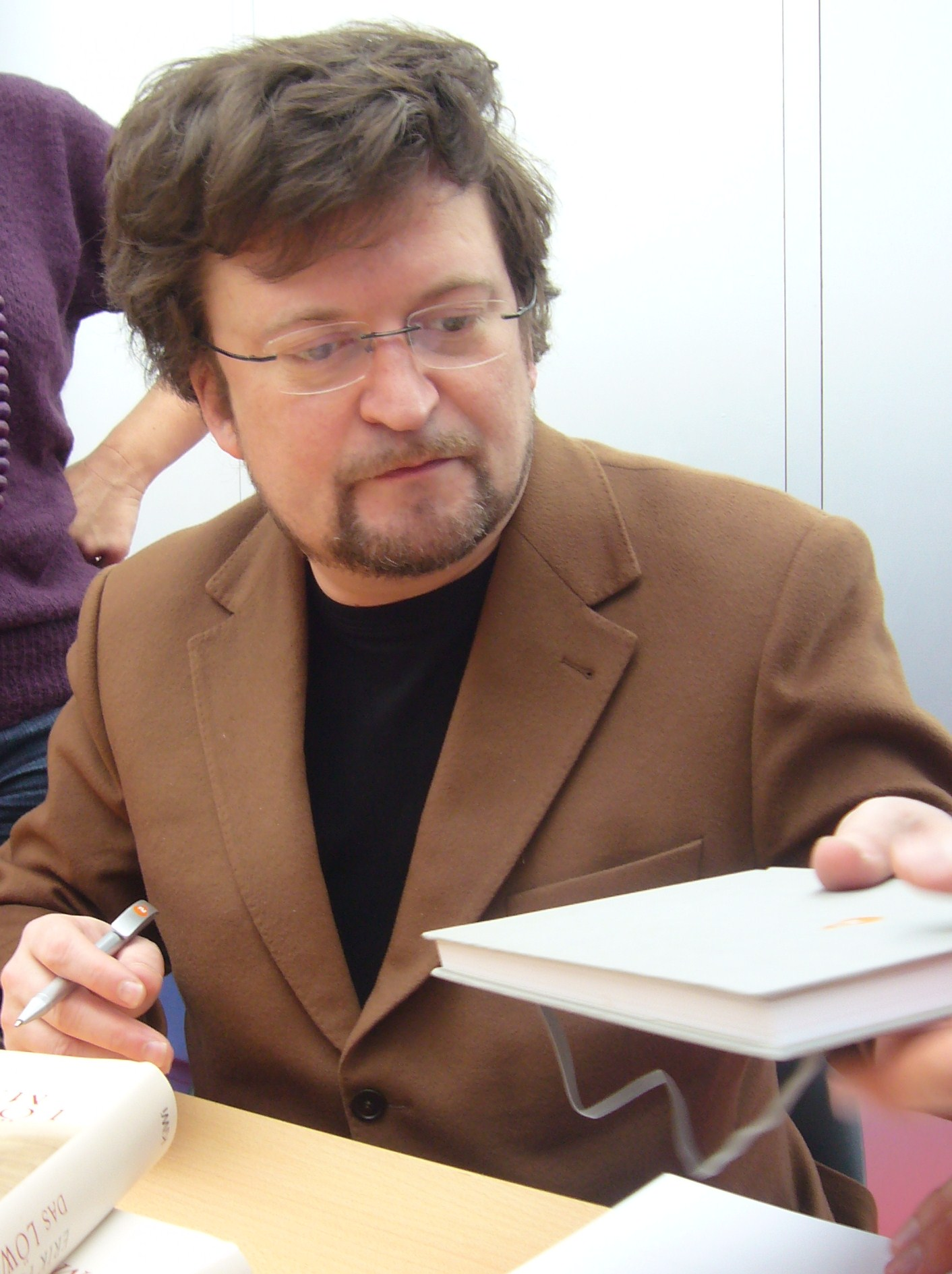
- Hansen in March 2008
- Born: 6 June 1965 (age 61); New York, United States
- Occupation: Writer
- Writing career
- Period: 1985–present
- Genres: Fiction, biography

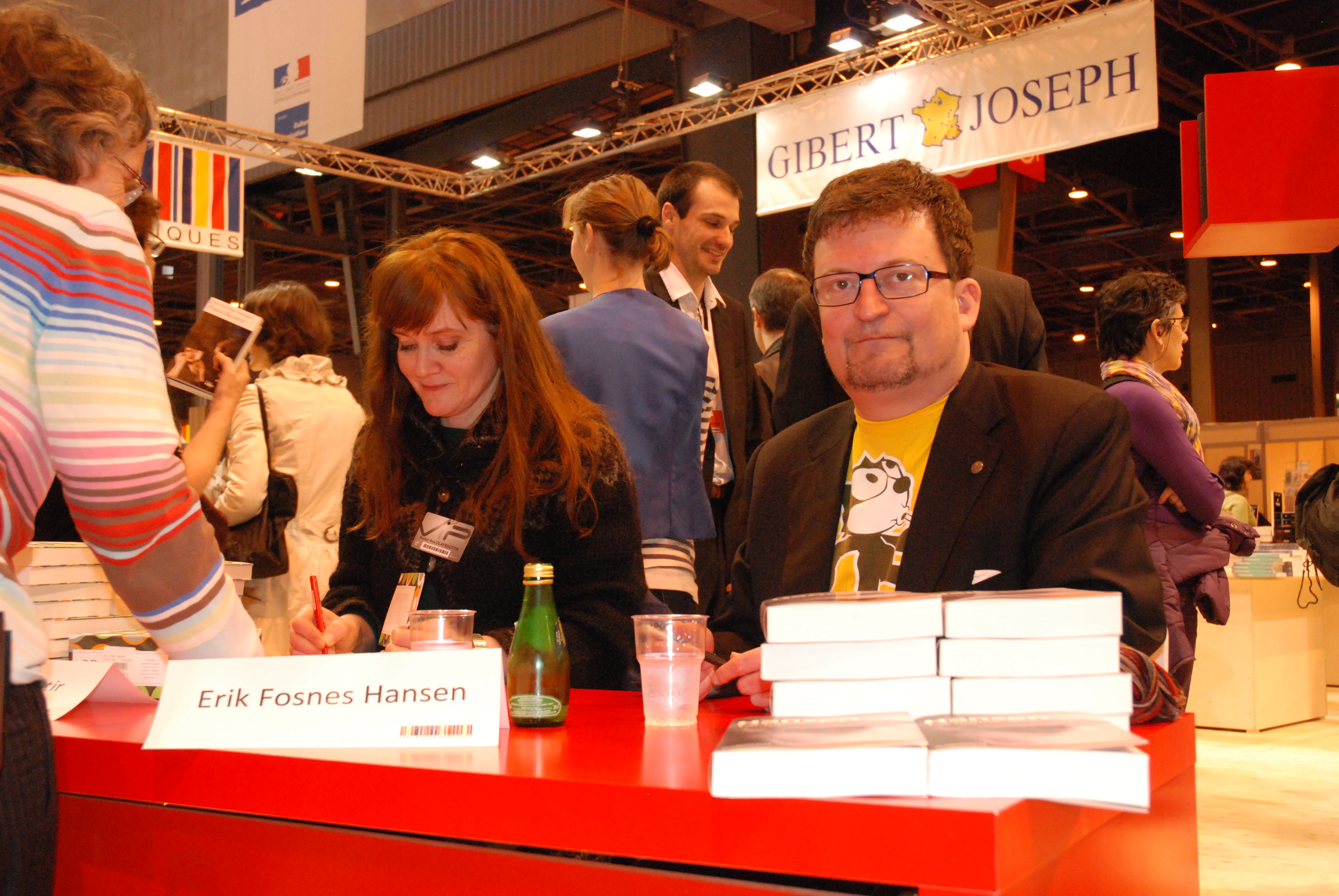
Auður Ava Ólafsdóttir and Erik Fosnes Hansen (March 2011)

Erik Fosnes Hansen (born 6 June 1965) is a Norwegian writer.

Hansen was born in New York and made his debut at age twenty with the novel Falketårnet. His best-known work is his second novel, Psalm at Journey's End, which in separate but steadily more interwoven stories follows the individual musicians who end their careers and lives on the Titanic. The book has been translated into more than twenty languages. A sequel to Beretninger om beskyttelse (Tales of Protection) has been announced but is not yet completed.

He has also published poetry and is a frequent contributor to contemporary public cultural discussions.

Hansen is a member of the Norwegian Academy for Language and Literature. He was awarded the Riksmål Society Literature Prize in 1990.

Hansen gained attention in the Norwegian press after throwing a piece of paper at a representative of the Progress Party during a heated debate on the radio station NRK P2.

== Bibliography ==
- 1985: Falketårnet
- 1990: Salme ved reisens slutt (Psalm at Journey's End)
- 1998: Beretninger om beskyttelse (Tales of Protection)
- 2001: Underveis, a portrait of Princess Märtha Louise of Norway
- 2005: Kokebok for Otto
- 2006: The Lion Woman
- 2016: Hummerliv (Lobster Life)
- 2020: Langs landeveien mellom Cottbus og Berlin (On the Road between Cottbus and Berlin)

Awards
Preceded by not awarded	Recipient of the Cappelen Prize; 2006 (shared with Torbjørn Færøvik)	Succeeded by —
