= Eskeland =

Eskeland is a Norwegian surname. Notable people with the surname include:

- Ivar Eskeland (1927–2005), Norwegian philologist, publisher, translator, biographer, literary critic, newspaper editor, theatre worker, radio personality and organizational leader
- Lars Eskeland (1867–1942), Norwegian educator and writer
- Liv Kari Eskeland (born 1965), Norwegian politician
- Roger Eskeland (born 1977), Norwegian footballer
- Severin Eskeland (1880–1964), Norwegian educator, biographer and politician
- Ståle Eskeland (1943–2015), Norwegian jurist
