= Aaraas =

Aaraas is a Norwegian surname. Notable people with the surname include:

- Hans Aaraas (1919–1998), Norwegian writer
- Hans Aaraas (musician), Norwegian musician
- Jon Aaraas (born 1986), Norwegian ski jumper
- Olav Aaraas (born 1950), Norwegian historian
