= Eva Børresen =

Norwegian ceramist (1920–2022)

- Born: Eva Elisabeth Hecker; 29 November 1920; Berlin, Brandenburg, Prussia, Germany
- Died: 3 September 2022 (aged 101); Fredrikstad, Norway
- Education: State Academy of Fine Arts Stuttgart
- Occupation: Ceramist
- Relatives: Hilde Hagerup (granddaughter); Klaus Hagerup (son-in-law)

Eva Elisabeth Børresen (29 November 1920 – 3 September 2022) was a Norwegian ceramist.

== Biography ==
Born on 29 November 1920 in Berlin, Børresen studied under sculptor Alfred Lörcher at the State Academy of Fine Arts Stuttgart from 1937 to 1939. She married carpenter Runar Børresen in 1939, and they settled in Norway, first in Lillehammer. She established a ceramic workshop in Oslo in 1942, and moved to Trondheim in 1946. She was awarded a gold medal at the Milan Triennial in 1954. The family eventually moved to Bergen and later to Fredrikstad. She died in Fredrikstad on 3 September 2022.

Børresen is represented at the National Museum of Art, Architecture and Design.
