= Tom Lotherington =

Norwegian writer and translator (born 1950)

- Born: 15 June 1950; Tønsberg
- Died: 21 August 2026 (aged 76)
- Occupations: Writer and translator
- Awards: Mads Wiel Nygaards Endowment; Bastian Prize; Herman Wildenvey Poetry Award

Tom Lotherington (15 June 1950 – 21 August 2026) was a Norwegian poet, novelist, biographer and translator.

His awards include the Mads Wiel Nygaards Endowment, the Herman Wildenvey Poetry Award, and the Bastian Prize.

== Life and career ==
Born in Tønsberg on 15 June 1950, Lotherington made his literary debut in 1972 with the poetry collection Hverdagsfantasier. He followed up with the poetry collection Det kan ikke fortsette slik (1975). In 1975 he settled in France, and his collection Tilstander (1978) shows influence from French poetry.

His novel Den tredje tjeneren (1985) is about an aspiring author who has settled along with his wife in Provence, written in a framework of biblical allegories. Kjødets gjerninger (1989) is a burlesque novel about asolescent passion. He also wrote biographies on the poets Herman Wildenvey and Harald Sverdrup. He was head of The Norwegian Writers' Center from 2001 to 2005. His translation of Les Bienveillantes by Jonathan Littell into Norwegian language earned him the Bastian Prize in 2009. He has further written the satirical novel Delt løsning (2009), the novels Et dikt om Elise (2014) and Som en sky på himmelen (2018), and the poetry collection Gamleveien og andre dikt 2020).

Lotherington received the Mads Wiel Nygaards Endowment in 1995 and the Herman Wildenvey Poetry Award in 2010.

Lotherington died on 21 August 2026, at the age of 76.

Awards
Preceded by Per Qvale	Recipient of the Bastian Prize; 2009	Succeeded by Isak Rogde
