= Olaus Alvestad =

Norwegian educator and newspaper editor

Peter Olaus Alvestad (21 January 1866 – 12 October 1903) was a Norwegian educator and newspaper editor.

Born in Haram Municipality, he graduated from Asker Seminary in 1888. He worked as a teacher at several schools, including Sagatun Folk High School, until 1895 when he founded Voss Folk High School together with Lars Eskeland. In 1896 he bought the local newspaper Hordaland, and became editor-in-chief. In 1898 he published the songbook Norsk Songbok for Ungdomsskular og Ungdomslag, which became very popular through the twentieth century. He left the folk high school in 1902, and died the next year.
