= Milada Blekastad =

Czech-Norwegian literary historian

Milada Blekastad (born Milada Topičová; 1 July 1917 – 25 October 2003) was a Czech-Norwegian literary historian, translator and Bohemist. From the 1930s, she lived in Norway.

== Personal life ==
She was born Milada Topičová on 1 July 1917 in Prague. Her grandfather František Topič was one of the most prominent publishers in that city and often published Nordic literature; her father Jaroslav Topič was a publisher as well and her mother Milada Topičová was a translator. As a fifteen-year old, Milada Topičová received an invitation from Gunnvor Krokann, wife of the writer Inge Krokann, to travel to Norway. There she met the artist Hallvard Blekastad (1883–1966), whom she married in 1934. She was quick to learn nynorsk and spoke fluent Gausdal dialect, but she translated to both nynorsk and bokmål.

She had seven children.

She died on 25 October 2003 in Oslo. She is buried at the Topič family tomb at Olšany Cemetery in Prague.

== Career ==
She was a lecturer in Czech at the University of Oslo from 1957. She took the dr.philos. degree in 1969 with the thesis Comenius, Versuch eines Umrisses von Leben, Werk und Schicksal des Jan Amos Komenský. She was a Government scholar from 1970.

She wrote several academic and popular works on Comenius. Books about him include Menneskenes sak (1977), and translations include Verdsens labyrint (1955; orig. 1631) and Informatoriet for skulen hennar mor (1965).

She was a prolific translator between Czech and Norwegian, being awarded the Bastian Prize in 1969 for translating Ludvík Vaculík's The Axe. She wrote historical overviews Millom aust og vest (1958) and Millom bork og ved (1978) as well as publishing the fairytale collection Tsjekkiske og Slovakiske eventyr in four volumes between 1939 and 1955.

She was a member of the Norwegian Academy of Science and Letters and of the Norwegian PEN Club. In 1997, she was awarded the Medal of Merit, First Grade, by the president of the Czech Republic Václav Havel.

Awards
Preceded by Albert Lange Fliflet	Recipient of the Bastian Prize; 1969	Succeeded by Lotte Holmboe
