= Rogde =

Rogde is a surname. Notable people with the surname include:

- Ingolf Rogde (1911–1978), Norwegian actor
- Isak Rogde (1947–2010), Norwegian translator
