= Anne-Lisa Amadou =

Norwegian literary researcher (1930–2002)

Anne-Lisa Amadou (4 March 1930 – 19 March 2002) was a Norwegian literary researcher.

She was born in Oslo. In 1966, she took her Doctor of Philosophy (PhD) degree with a thesis on Marcel Proust.

She was a Professor of French literature at the University of Oslo from 1970 to 1982. In 1981, she was awarded the Bastian Prize for her translation of In Search of Lost Time. (French: A la recherche du temps perdu) and, in 1984, the Fritt Ord Honorary Award.

== Work ==
- 1965 The poet and his work – a study in Marcel Proust's aesthetics about Marcel Proust
- 1970 The Face of Tartuffe and Other Essays on Molière
- 1978 Eleven French novel studies on Marcel Proust
- 1994 Giving love a language about Sigrid Undset

Awards
Preceded by Carsten Middelthon	Recipient of the Bastian Prize; 1981	Succeeded by Hans Aaraas
