= Fartein =

Fartein is a given name. Notable people with the name include:

- Fartein Døvle Jonassen (born 1971), Norwegian novelist and translator
- Fartein Valen (1887–1952), Norwegian composer
- Fartein Valen-Sendstad (1918–1984), Norwegian historian
