= Tynset =

Tynset may refer to:

== Places ==
- Tynset Municipality, a municipality in Innlandet county, Norway.
- Tynset (town), a town within Tynset Municipality in Innlandet county, Norway
- Tynset Church, a church in Tynset Municipality in Innlandet county, Norway

== Other ==
- Tynset (novel), a lyrical work of prose published in 1965 by the German writer Wolfgang Hildesheimer
- Tynset IF, a Norwegian sports club from Tynset municipality in Innlandet county, Norway
