= Nils Ivar Agøy =

Norwegian historian and theologian (born 1959)

Nils Ivar Agøy (born 19 November 1959) is a Norwegian historian, theologian, tolkienologist and translator.

He hails from Gjøvik. He took the cand.philol. degree in history at the University of Oslo in 1987, with the master's thesis Kampen mot vernetvangen. Militærnekterspørsmålet i Norge 1885–1922. The thesis chronicled and explained conscientious objection in Norway before 1922. His academic advisor was Jorunn Bjørgum.

Already in 1988 he graduated with the cand.theol. degree in theology at the MF Norwegian School of Theology. Subsequently, he was employed as a research fellow in history at the Peace Research Institute Oslo, finishing his dr.philos. degree in history in 1994. His thesis Militæretaten og "den indre fiende" fra 1905 til 1940. Hemmelige sikkerhetsstyrker i Norge sett i et skandinavisk perspektiv explored the military precautions against "inner enemies"—defined as revolutionary segments—between the 1905 Norwegian independence and the Second World War, against a Scandinavian backdrop. His doctoral advisor was Ottar Dahl.

He was appointed as associate professor of modern history at Telemark University College in 1994, and was promoted to professor in 2002. In 2010 he released Kirken og arbeiderbevegelsen, the result of ten years of work. The book explores ties between the Church of Norway and other congregations, and the labour movement in Norway. He concluded that the relations between Christians and labour leaders were less marked by strife and more by cooperation that hitherto believed.

Agøy is a co-founder of Norwegian Tolkien Society Arthedain.

Agøy's translation debut was J. R. R. Tolkien's Silmarillion. For this he was awarded the Bastian Prize, a translator's prize in Norway, in 1995. He has later been a jury member for the children's literature class of the Bastian Prize, which is awarded by the Norwegian Association of Literary Translators. In 1997 he released the second Norwegian translation of The Hobbit, and he has also translated Unfinished Tales of Númenor and Middle-earth.

In 2003 he released a book on J. R. R. Tolkien himself, titled Mytenes mann ("Man of the Myths"). The purpose was to write an introductory Tolkien book in Norwegian, and Agøy used original Tolkien documents archived in Oxford to construct a compounded biography and analysis of Tolkien's body of work. The book received a favourable review in VG; the reviewer gave a "die throw" of 5 out of 6 and complimented Agøy for his "deep insight in Tolkien's world of ideas and sources of inspiration". Aftenposten praised it moderately as a "readable entry portal to the world of Tolkien".

He resides in Bø i Telemark, where Telemark University College is located, and is married to current secretary-general and former chair of the Church of Norway Council on Ecumenical and International Relations, Berit Hagen Agøy.

Awards
Preceded by Merete Alfsen	Recipient of the Bastian Prize; 1995	Succeeded by Kåre Langvik-Johannessen
