= Arne Dørumsgaard =

Norwegian composer, poet, translator and music collector

- Born: 7 December 1921; Fredrikstad, Norway
- Died: 13 March 2006 (aged 84); Marzio, Italy
- Occupation(s): Composer, poet, translator and music collector
- Awards: Bastian Prize (1979); Order of St. Olav (1994)

Arne Dørumsgaard (7 December 1921 – 13 March 2006) was a Norwegian composer, poet, translator and music collector. He started his professional career as a composer, but is also known for his translations of Eastern poetry and for his large collection of sound recordings.

== Early life ==
Arne Dørumsgaard was born in Fredrikstad to teachers Peder Dørumsgaard and Kitty Hilda Kristoffersen. He initially took piano lessons in Fredrikstad, and later studied piano, harmonics, counterpoint, and orchestration in Oslo. He debuted as a composer already as a 13-year-old and had his very own composer debut evening at the age of 20.

== Career ==
Dørumsgaard wrote well over 100 songs to texts of Arne Garborg, Knut Hamsun, Hans Henrik Holm, Jacob Sande, Ragnvald Vaage, Arnulf Øverland, and others. He also wrote several piano works and a film score. In the 1940s Dørumsgaard worked as a music theory teacher and a newspaper music critic.

He wrote several arrangements to vocal music from the period 1250–1850. These arrangements were recorded by Kirsten Flagstad, Teresa Berganza, and Gérard Souzay among others. Dørumsgaard ended his composer career before turning 30.

He started in 1949 to work on translations of Chinese, Japanese and Korean poetry into Norwegian language. The reproductions of Oriental poetry from the earliest dynasties up to the 20th century were published in 25 volumes between 1951 and 1985.

In 1976–1988 Dørumsgaard was a cultural adviser to the Norwegian government.

His collection of sound recordings was among the world's largest private music collections, consisting some 100,000 items. The collection documents especially the interpretation and performance of European music. Dørumsgaard sold the collection to the municipality of Stavanger for the symbolic price of 1 Norwegian krone in 1984. The collection still stayed in his possession and under his management. In 2002 the collection was physically transferred to Stavanger where it is managed by the Norwegian Institute of Recorded Sound. The collection is growing still: it had in 2017 some 120,000 LP records, 50,000 78 RPM records, 10,000 magnetic reel tapes, 5,000 cassettes, thousands of printed items, and many kinds of recording and playback machines.

== Recognition ==
Dørumsgaard was a Norwegian state stipendiary since 1975. He was awarded the Bastian Prize in 1979, and was appointed honorary doctor of literature in Taipei University in 1982, for his work with the reproductions of the ancient poetry of the East. He was decorated Knight, First Class of the Order of St. Olav in 1994 for his work in music and literature.

== Private life ==
Dørumsgaard and pianist Tora Øwre married in 1942 and had two children. The couple divorced in 1946. He married lyricist and painter Nella Valenza in 1971.

After the second world war Dørumsgaard was upset by the way the Norwegian state treated Kirsten Flagstad and in 1950 started a self-imposed exile in France. He moved in 1968 to the village of Marzio in northern Italy where he lived until his death in 2006.

== See also ==
- Music of Norway
