= Åse-Marie Nesse =

Norwegian philologist, translator and poet

Åse-Marie Nesse ( 29 April 1934 – 13 July 2001) was a Norwegian philologist, translator and poet.

== Biography ==
Åse-Marie Nesse was born in Klepp Municipality, in Rogaland county, Norway. She finished her secondary education in 1952 at Rogaland offentlege landsgymnas. She attended Oslo Teachers' College from 1953 to 1955, then worked as a school teacher before enrolling at the University of Oslo. She graduated with the cand.philol. degree in 1963, and was hired as a lecturer in Germanic studies. She was later promoted to associate professor, and retired in 2000.

She was also a translator and for her first translation, of Tynset by Wolfgang Hildesheimer, she was awarded the Bastian Prize in 1967. She also won the Dobloug Prize in 1999. Her main work was translating Faust: The First Part of the Tragedy and Faust: The Second Part of the Tragedy to Nynorsk. She also translated from English, Spanish, Dutch and French, and often had to employ poetic reproduction. Her own poetry debut came in 1970 with Av hav er du komen. She chaired the Norwegian branch of International PEN for many years, and was a member of the Arts Council Norway. She was also a member of the Norwegian Cultural Council and Authors Association Literary Council.

Åse-Marie Nesse received many awards and badges of honor during her career. She was decorated with the Federal Cross of Merit in 1993 and the Royal Norwegian Order of St. Olav (Knight First Class) in 2001. She died in 2001 from cancer.

== Awards ==
- Bastianprisen (1967)
- Sarpsborgprisen (1976)
- Sunnmørsprisen (1978)
- Stavanger Aftenblads kulturpris (1981)
- Ønskediktprisen (1981)
- Klepp kommunes kulturpris (1992)
- Den tyske æresordenen Bundesverdienstkreuz (1993)
- Førstepremie i konkurranse om gjendikting av Shakespeare-sonett (1998)
- Bokklubbenes skjønnlitterære oversetterpris (1999)
- Doblougprisen (1999)
- Nynorsk litteraturpris (2000)

Awards
Preceded by Hans Braarvig	Recipient of the Bastian Prize; 1967	Succeeded by Albert Lange Fliflet
