= Middelthon =

Middelthon is a surname. Notable people with the surname include:

- Carsten Middelthon (1916–2005), Norwegian journalist and translator
- Cornelius Middelthon (1869–1934), Norwegian grocer and politician
