= Ivar Orgland =

Norwegian writer

Carl Ivar Orgland (13 October 1921 – 16 June 1994) was a Norwegian philologist, lexicographer, translator and poet. He is especially known for his work with Icelandic culture, and language and literature.

== Academic career ==
He was born in Oslo, finished his secondary education in 1939, and graduated with a Cand.mag. degree in 1946 and a Cand.philol. degree in 1949. From 1950 onwards, he worked at the University of Iceland as a research fellow until 1952 and then lecturer in the Norwegian language. He left the University of Iceland in 1960, and after two years as a high school teacher in Notodden Municipality, he became a lecturer in Norwegian at Lund University from 1962 to 1969. In 1969, he also received a Dr.philos.degree. The doctorate, on the subject of Stefán frá Hvítadal, was taken at the University of Iceland, and Orgland was the first foreigner to do so. From 1969 to 1973 he was a lecturer at the Oslo Teachers' College, and from 1973 to 1979 he was a lecturer in the Icelandic language at the University of Oslo.

== Writings ==
He became known for translating Nordic works to Nynorsk, especially Icelandic—both medieval and modern—but also from the more obscure Faroese language and Modern Gutnish. Anthologies include Islandske dikt frå Solarljod til opplysningstid, Islandske gullalderdikt and Islandske dikt frå vårt hundreår. For his body of work he won the Bastian Prize, awarded by the Norwegian Association of Literary Translators, in 1986. He also issued several original works of poetry, having debuted in 1950 with the work Lilje og sverd ('Lily and Sword'). He has also written Norwegian-Icelandic dictionaries. During his younger days, he was also a tenor singer.

He was decorated with the Commander Cross of the Icelandic Order of the Falcon. He lived in Asker for the later part of his life, and died in 1994.

Awards
Preceded by Herbert Svenkerud	Recipient of the Bastian Prize; 1986	Succeeded by Anne Elligers
