= Kåre Langvik-Johannessen =

Norwegian philologist, literary historian and translator

Kåre Johannes Langvik-Johannessen (10 April 1919 – 27 October 2014) was a Norwegian philologist, literary historian and translator.

He was born in Onsøy as a son of manager Hans Johannessen (1889–1986) and Betzy Langvik (1887–1963). He finished his secondary education in 1939 in Fredrikstad, and during the Second World War he studied piano and organ, and took commerce school. He enrolled in Norwegian studies at the University of Oslo in 1946, and graduated with the cand.mag. degree in 1948. The same year he travelled to the Hague to study Dutch language and literature. He took another degree at the University of Oslo in 1955 with the master's thesis Det bibelske drama i Nederlandene før Joost van den Vondel. In 1963 he took the dr.philos. degree on the topic Joost van den Vondel with the thesis Zwischen Himmel und Erde (1963).

He was a docent from 1965 and professor from 1972 until his retirement in 1989, both at the University of Oslo. He has also been a guest professor at the Catholic University of Leuven. Another important book about Joost van den Vondel, Het treurspel spant de kroon, came in 1987. Langvik-Johannessen has also studied Franz Grillparzer (the book Im Namen kaiserlicher Majestät, 1975) as well as the Rederijkers and Flemish drama. His 1980 book Nederlandenes litteratur gjennom 800 år is a collection of several lesser works. He also won the Bastian Prize in 1996 for translating John of Ruysbroeck's The Adornment of the Spiritual Marriage into Norwegian.

In 1999 he was decorated as a Knight of the Royal Norwegian Order of St. Olav. He was married twice, first to actress Ingrid Bothner from 1949 to 1959, then to Annika Lønnå (1936–2006) in 1965.

Awards
Preceded by Nils Ivar Agøy	Recipient of the Bastian Prize; 1996	Succeeded by Johannes Gjerdåker
