= Knut Ødegård =

Norwegian poet

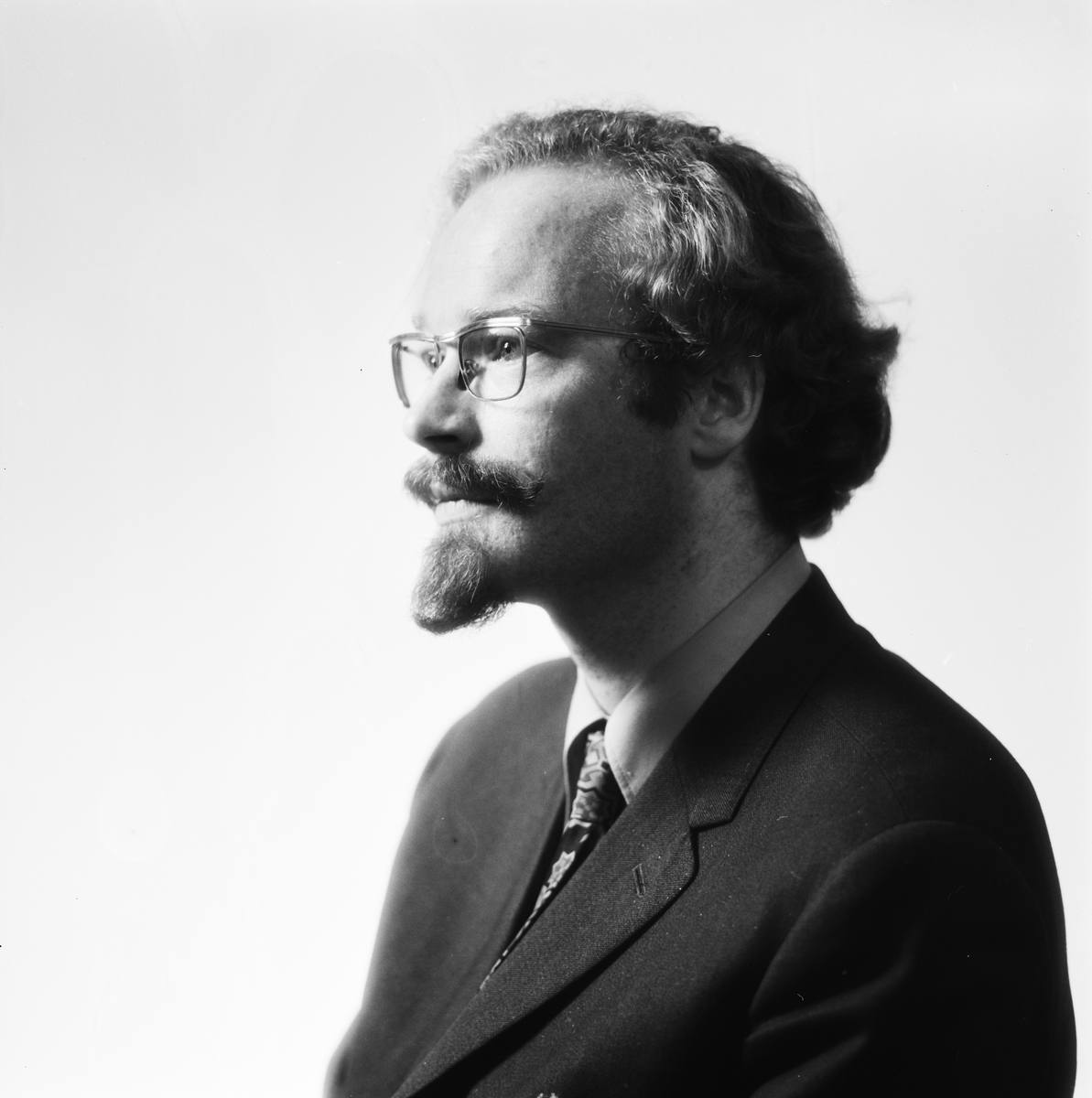
Knut Ødegård.

Knut Ødegård (born 6 November 1945) is a Norwegian poet.

== Biography ==
Born in 1945 in Molde, Norway, Ødegård made his poetic debut in 1967. Since then he has published more than fifty books, many volumes of poetry, two novels for young adults, two books about Iceland, a play, and several reinterpretations. His own works are recognized internationally as deeply original and high quality poetry and his poetry books are translated into 42 languages (2022), among these five separate collections in English.

He was the founder and president of the Bjørnson Festival, the Norwegian International Literature Festival, held in homage to Nobel laureate Bjørnstjerne Bjørnson, for a decade. He was the founder and president of Bjørnstjerne Bjørnson-Akademiet, The Norwegian Academy of Literature and Freedom of Expression, 2003–2015.

He shares his time between a home in Molde and another in Reykjavík, Iceland. He is married to the Icelandic choral conductor Þorgerður Ingólfsdóttir.

== Selected works ==
- 1982: Wind over Romsdal, poems, translated by George Johnston.
- 1989: *Bee-Buzz, Salmon Leap (1989), poems, translated by George Johnston.
- 2002: Missa, poems, translated by Brian McNeil
- 2005: Judas Iscariot and Other Poems, translated by Brian McNeil
- 2009: "Selected Poems", translated by Brian McNeil
- 2024: "Time has come", translated by Brian McNeil

=== In Norwegian ===
- Drøymaren, vandraren og kjelda. Lyrikk. Noregs Boklag, 1967
- Konsert i eit kvitt hus. Lyrikk. Noregs Boklag, 1968
- I pensjonatet. Lyrikk. Noregs Boklag, 1970
- Det mørke regnet. Lyrikk, Aschehoug, 1972
- Einar Bragi: Regn i mai. Gjendikting, Noregs Boklag, 1973
- Færøysk lyrikk. Gjendiktningar av færøysk notidslyrikk med essay. Aschehoug 1974
- Gyula Illyés: Dikt i utval. Gjendikting (s.m. Vince Sulyok). Aschehoug, 1974
- Fuglen og draumen. Barnebok. Noregs Boklag, 1974
- Ólafur Jóhann Sigurðsson: Ved brunnane. Gjendikting. Aschehoug, 1976
- Hoggormen. Skodespel. Dreyer, 1977
- Vind gjennom Romsdal. Lyrikk. Noregs Boklag, 1978
- Bjørnstjerne Bjørnson, i utvalg av Knut Ødegård. Dikt. Den norske Bokklubben, 1979.
- Broder Eysteinn: Lilja. Gjendikting med essay. Tiden Norsk Forlag, 1980
- Einarr Skúlason: Geisli. Gjendikting med essay. Tiden Norsk Forlag, 1982
- Biesurr, laksesprang. Lyrikk. Cappelen, 1983
- Ørneblodet. Ungdomsbok. Tiden Norsk Forlag, 1983
- Gudehovet. Ungdomsbok. Cappelen, 1984
- Leid Henrik Ibsen ad Petri Gaut. Essay. 1989
- Moderne islandske dikt. Gjendiktingar med essay. Samlaget, 1990
- Kinomaskinist. Lyrikk. Cappelen, 1991
- Molde, mitt Molde. Dikt og prologar. Molde kommune, 1992.
- Island, øya mellom øst og vest. Sakprosa. Aschehoug, 1992
- Buktale. Lyrikk. Cappelen, 1994
- Matthias Johannessen: Om vindheim vide. Gjendikting. Cappelen forlag, 1994
- Dikt i utval (v/Kolbeinn Falkeid og Edvard Hoem). Lyrikk. Cappelen, 1995
- Milan Richter: Røter i lufta. Gjendikting med essay. Cappelen, 1996
- Missa. Lyrikk. Cappelen, 1998
- Island. Fra saga til samtid. Sakprosa. Aschehoug, 1998
- Matthías Johannessen: Salmer i atomalderen. Gjendikting. Cappelen, 2002
- Nysilt. CD s.m. Inger Johanne Brunvoll Band, 2002
- Stephensen-huset. Lyrikk. Cappelen, 2003
- Ödön von Horváth: Historier frå Wienerskogen. Drama. Samlaget, 2003
- Kringsjå. Dikt i utval (v/Thorvald Steen). Lyrikk. Cappelen, 2005
- Grøne dikt. 9 moderne irske lyrikarar. Antologi. Gjendikting med essay (s.m. Jostein Sæbøe). Cappelen, 2005
- Står om enn tårnene faller. Kyrkjespel i høve Molde domkyrkjes 50-års jubileum. 2007
- Jóhann Hjálmarsson: Storm er et vakkert ord. Gjendikting. Solum forlag, 2007
- Knut A. Ødegård sen.: Kornåker under himmelen. Dikt og essay. Fræna kommune, 2009
- Det blomstra så sinnssjukt. Lyrikk. Cappelen Damm, 2009
- Åsmund Sveen: Guten låg i graset. Dikt i utval ved Knut Ødegård og Knut Imerslund, 2009
- Glacovi od cever, covremena, norveska poesija, moderne norsk lyrikk på makedonsk, utval, redigering og innleiingsessay (s.m. Yasminka Markovska). Struga, 2009
- Friedrich Schiller: Don Carlos. Gjendikting. Samlaget, 2010
- Eksempelet Island: om hvordan nykapitalismen angriper et folk. Sakprosa, red. og artiklar. Arneberg forlag, 2010
- Olav den hellige. Spor etter helgenkongen. Essays og gjendiktingar (s.m. Lars Roar Langslet. Forlaget Press, 2011
- Mennesket i sorteringssamfunnet. Sakprosa, red. og bidrag. Arneberg forlag, 2011
- Fine spinn av draumar. Makedonske dikt. Antologi. Gjendiktingar og essay (s.m. Yasminka Markovska). Dreyers forlag, 2011
- Edda-dikt I, Voluspå og Håvåmål. Gjendikting, essay og kommentarar. Cappelen Damm, 2013
- Edda-dikt II, Gudedikt. Gjendikting, essay og kommentarar, Cappelen Damm, 2014
- Liabonden. Prosatekstar. Via Media 2014.
- Gerður Kristný: Blodhest. Gjendikting med essay. Nordsjøforlaget, 2014.
- Edda-dikt III, Heltedikt 1. Gjendikting, essay og kommentarar. Cappelen Damm, 2015
- Drankarar og galningar. Dikt i utval (v/Endre Ruset og Steinar Opstad). Cappelen Damm, 2015
- Edda-dikt IV, Heltedikt, del 2. Gjendikting, essay og kommentarar. Cappelen Damm, 2016
- UFO og englar over Holmarka. Prosatekstar. Via Media 2016
- Tida er inne. Lyrikk. Cappelen Damm, 2017
- Missa. Lydbok. ebok.no, 2017,
- Fuglespråk, roman. Cappelen Damm, 2019.
- Sirkusdirektøren - og andre dikt, lyrikk, Cappelen Damm, 2020.
- Teikn i sol og måne, prosatekster, Via Media, 2022.
- Samuel Pedersens reisedagbok, lyrikk, Cappelen Damm, 2023.
- Gerður Kristný: Selmor. Gjendiktning med etterord. Cappelen Damm, 2024.
- Mitt kvite hår i vinden, lyrikk, Cappelen Damm, 2025

=== Anthologies ===
- Various authors (2023). Jarquín, Carlos Javier (ed.). Canto planetario: hermandad en la Tierra. Costa Rica: HC Editores. ISBN 979-8850092115.

== Distinctions ==
Ødegård is appointed a Norwegian State Scholar by the Norwegian Parliament as well as a Consul General for the Republic of Macedonia in Norway (1997) and an honorary professor of literature at the Mongolian State University of Arts and Culture, and he has received many prizes and awards for his literary work.

=== National orders ===
- Norway: Knight 1. class of the Royal Norwegian Order of Merit (1997) by the King of Norway

=== Foreign orders ===
- Holy See: Equestrian Order of the Holy Sepulchre of Jerusalem (2009), knighted by Cardinal Foley. Knight Commander (2016). Grand Officer (with star) (2022)
- Iceland: Knight Commander of the Order of the Falcon by the President of Iceland (1995). Commander with Star (2017).
- Sovereign Military Order of Malta, knighted 2021.

=== Other ===
- (Norway) Bastian Prize (1984) by the Norwegian Association of Literary Translators
- (Norway) Anders Jahre Cultural Prize (2001)
- Slovakia Jan Smrek Prize (2009) for his literary work in Bratislava, Slovakia
- (Sweden) Dobloug Prize (2011) by the Swedish Academy
- Golden Medal, 1. Prize, World Congress of Poets, Taiwan (2010)
- The Goden Key of Smederevo, Serbia (2014)
- International poetry prize Le Prix Special and Mihai Eminescu medal, Academie Internationale "Mihai Eminescu", Romania (2015)
- International poetry prize The Golden Grape, Kosovo (2016)
- Ulaanbaatar international poetry prize, Mongolia (2017)
- Festival Poet, Dei nynorske Festspela, Norway (2024)
- Le Grand Prix, Académie Internationale "Mihai Eminescu", Romania (2024)
- Gold Medal Dionysius Exiguus, Academia Tomitana, Romania (2024)

Awards
| Preceded by Ole Michael Selberg | Recipient of the Bastian Prize; 1984 | Succeeded by Herbert Svenkerud |
