= Torill Eide =

Norwegian children's writer

- Born: 24 February 1950 (age 76)
- Occupation: Children's writer
- Awards: Brage Prize

Torill Eide (born 24 February 1950) is a Norwegian children's writer.

She made her literary debut in 1978 with Ville så gjerne fortelle om sommeren..., a book for young adults. Among her other books are Det vil komme nye dager from 1983 and Huletur from 1988. She was awarded the Brage Prize in 1993 for Skjulte ærend.

Awards
| Preceded by Ragnar Hovland | Recipient of the Brage Prize for children and youth 1993 | Succeeded by Klaus Hagerup |
