= Dag Heyerdahl Larsen =

Norwegian translator

Dag Heyerdahl Larsen (25 October 1955 – 7 January 2012) was a Norwegian translator. He was born in Asker. He was awarded the Bastian Prize in 2004.
