= George Benson Johnston =

Canadian poet (1913–2004)

- Born: October 7, 1913; Hamilton, Ontario
- Died: August 2004; Athelstan, Quebec
- Spouse: Jeanne McCrae
- Writing career
- Language: English
- Notable work: The Cruising Auk

George Benson Johnston (October 7, 1913 – August 2004) was a Canadian poet, translator, and academic "best known for lyric poetry that delineates with good-humoured wisdom the pleasures and pains of suburban family life." He also had an international reputation as a scholar and translator of the Icelandic Sagas.

== Life ==
Johnston was born in Hamilton, Ontario, in 1913, the son of Margaret Black and Benson Johnston, an insurance agent. The family moved to the Toronto suburbs in 1923. Johnston knew in high school that he wanted to be a writer.

He studied at the University of Toronto under Pelham Edgar and E. J. Pratt. There he "read T.S. Eliot, the early William Butler Yeats, James Joyce, Ezra Pound, and added Alexander Pope as a personal favorite." In 1935 he published two poems, "Annabelle" and "The Life in August," in the college magazine, Acta Victoriana.

Johnston received his B.A. in 1936, and went to Europe. He stayed in England, continuing to write. He published a story in the London Mercury in 1937. He soon returned to Canada, but continued to send his work to British magazines.

Johnston served as a Royal Canadian Air Force pilot in World War II, serving in Canada, Britain, and West Africa. In 1944 he married Jeanne McCrae; their family would include six children, five by birth and one by adoption.

After the war Johnston returned to the University of Toronto, receiving his M.A. in 1946 under the direction of Northrop Frye. He taught at Mount Allison University from 1947 to 1949.

In 1950 Johnston joined the English department at Carleton College in Ottawa (now Carleton University), where he taught until retirement in 1979.

Johnston learned Old Norse from Peter Foote of the University of London, and in 1957 began translating Norse sagas. His first effort, The Saga of Gisli, appeared in 1963; it is still in print. Seven of its poems were included in The Oxford Book of Verse in English Translation, edited by Charles Tomlinson.

Johnston has made a dozen translations from Old and Modern Icelandic, Danish, Norwegian, and Faeroese. He has translated two books of poetry by Norwegian poet Knut Ødegård.

In 1959 Johnston published his first book of his own poetry, The Cruising Auk, which was favourably reviewed by Eric Nicol and Northrop Frye, and by the American magazine Alphabet. Alphabet, Chicago's Poetry magazine, and Canada's Tamarack Review, all became regular outlets for Johnson's new work.

He composed a biography of his friend, the painter Carl Fellman Schaefer.

After retiring, Johnston moved to Athelstan, in South-western Quebec, to raise bees and continue to write.

== Writing ==
The Canadian Encyclopedia calls Johnston "best known for lyric poetry that delineates with good-humoured wisdom the pleasures and pains of suburban family life." The Encyclopedia of Literature in Canada says that his books "contain witty and domestic satires" which "hint at uncertainty and vulnerability as well."

Northrop Frye called The Cruising Auk "a beautifully unified book, the apparently casual poems carrying the reader along from the first poem to the last in a voyage of self-discovery." He added :"Johnston is an irresistibly readable and quotable poet. His finest technical achievement, I think, apart from his faultless sense of timing, is his ability to incorporate the language of the suburbs into his own diction."

Johnston's work features a recurring persona, Edward, forever on the verge of drowning.

== Recognition ==
Johnston has received honorary degrees from Queen's University and Carleton University.

An issue of Malahat Review (78, March 1987) was devoted to him.

Writing in Canadian Poetry in 1992, W.J. Keith called "attention to the unfortunate — one is tempted to say scandalous — neglect" of Johnston's poetry by critics and anthologists "in the last twenty years or so."

A festschrift, The Old Enchanter: A Portrait of George Johnston, was published in 1999.

== Publications ==
=== Poetry ===
- The Cruising Auk. Toronto, Oxford U P, 1959.
- Home Free. Toronto: Oxford, 1966.
- Happy Enough: Poems 1935-72. Toronto: Oxford, 1972. ISBN 0-19-540199-9
- Taking a Grip: Poems 1971-78. Ottawa: Golden Dog, 1978. ISBN 0-919614-27-2
- Auk Redivivus: Selected Poems. Ottawa: Golden Dog, 1981. ISBN 0-919614-39-6
- Ask Again. Moonbeam, ON: Penumbra, 1984. ISBN 0-920806-66-X
- Endeared by Dark: The Collected Poems. (1990).
- What is to Come: Selected and New Poems. Toronto, ON: The Saint Thomas Poetry Series, 1996. ISBN 0-9697802-1-4

=== Prose ===
- On Translation - II. London: Viking Society for Northern Research, U College, 1961.
- Carl: Portrait of a Painter (1986)

=== Translated ===
- The Saga of Gisli the Outlaw (1963. Toronto: U of Toronto P, 1999. ISBN 978-0-8020-6219-2
- The Faroe Islanders' Saga (1975)
- The Greenlanders' Saga (1976)
- Rocky Shores: An Anthology of Faroese Poetry. (Pastoral Investigation of Social Trends: Working Paper). Wilfion Books, 1981. ISBN 978-0-905075-10-5
- Wind over Romsdale: Poems by Knut Ødegård. Moonbeam, ON: Penumbra P, 1982. ISBN 0-920806-21-X
- Bee-Buzz, Salmon Leap (1989), more poetry of Knut Ødegård. Moonbeam, ON: Penumbra P, 1988. ISBN 0-921254-01-6

=== Edited ===
- The Collected Poems of George Whalley. Kingston, ON: Quarry P, 1986. ISBN 0-919627-42-0, ISBN 0-919627-45-5

Except where noted, bibliographic information courtesy The Canadian Encyclopedia.
