= Albert Lange Fliflet =

Norwegian philologist and translator

Albert Lange Fliflet (10 May 1908 – 14 April 2001) was a Norwegian philologist and translator. He is best known for translating Kalevala.

He was born in Inderøy Municipality as a son of dean Andreas Vilhelm Agersborg Fliflet (1874–1956) and nurse Charlotte Lange (1869–1948). He grew up in Stjørdal Municipality and Øvre Sandsvær Municipality, and learned Latin, Hebrew, German and English from his parents. He started learning Finnish after the Finnish geology professor Aarne Laitakari visited the district in 1923, catching his interest in the language. The two subsequently wrote letters to each other. Fliflet finished his secondary education in 1926 in Kongsberg, and after enrolling at the Royal Frederick University in the same year, he graduated with the mag.art. degree in Finno-Ugric languages in 1938.

He worked as a school teacher in Tromsø from 1939 to 1941, and as a lecturer at the University of Bergen from 1964 to 1978. In between he worked as a freelance translator from Latin, German, Finnish, Hungarian and Dutch into Norwegian; mostly poetry. His first poetry translation was the anthology Finland synger from 1947. In 1967 he released Kalevala in Nynorsk. Fliflet also contributed to Norsk allkunnebok. He also translated Imre Madách, Gyula Illyés, Joost van den Vondel, Franz Grillparzer and Kanteletar.

He was awarded the Bastian Prize in 1968 for translating Kalevala, received an honorary degree at the University of Helsinki in 1990 and received the Pro Cultura Hungarica medal in 1996.

From 1946 to 1949 he was married to Lilli Gjerløw (1910–1998), from 1953 to Marianne Tudeer, and they got three children: Kristina Fliflet (translator), Gabriel Fliflet (artist and traditional musician) and Andreas Fliflet (associate professor and musician). He died in 2001.

Awards
Preceded by Åse-Marie Nesse	Recipient of the Bastian Prize; 1967	Succeeded by Milada Blekastad
