= Karin Gundersen =

Norwegian literary scholar and translator (1944–2024)

- Born: 27 August 1944; Malm, German-occupied Norway
- Died: 4 June 2024 (aged 79); Oslo, Norway
- Occupations: University professor; translator
- Employer: University of Oslo
- Awards: Bastian Prize (1993); Norwegian Critics Prize for Literature (2006); Dobloug Prize (2006)

Karin Gundersen (27 August 1944 – 4 June 2024) was a Norwegian literary scholar and translator.

== Biography ==
Gundersen was born in Malm, German-occupied Norway on 27 August 1944. A professor of French literature at the University of Oslo, she was also a translator of French literary works. She was awarded the Bastian Prize in 1993, for her translation of Stendhal's novel The Charterhouse of Parma into Norwegian. She received the Norwegian Critics Prize for Literature in 2006, for translation of Stendhal's autobiography The Life of Henry Brulard into Norwegian language. She was awarded the Dobloug Prize in 2006.

Gundersen was a fellow of the Norwegian Academy of Science and Letters and the Norwegian Academy for Language and Literature. She died in Oslo on 4 June 2024, at the age of 79.

Awards
Preceded by Aud Greiff	Recipient of the Bastian Prize; 1993	Succeeded by Merete Alfsen
