= Hans Braarvig =

Norwegian writer

Hans Braarvig (17 April 1905 – 11 February 1986) was a Norwegian writer.

He was born in Lillesand. He is best known as a crime writer, young adult fiction writer and novelist, partly under the pseudonym Haakon Bjerre. He was awarded the Bastian Prize for translation in 1966.

Awards
| Preceded by Sigmund Skard | Recipient of the Bastian Prize; 1966 | Succeeded by Åse-Marie Nesse |
