= Kari Kemény =

Norwegian translator (1950–2021)

- Born: Kari Erzsébet Kemény; 23 January 1950; Budapest
- Died: 21 April 2021 (aged 71); Oslo, Norway
- Occupation: translator

Kari Erzsébet Kemény (23 January 1950 – 21 April 2021) was a Norwegian translator. She received the Ministry of Culture and Church Affairs' prize for children's and young people's literature in 2000 and the Bastian Prize in 2001. She was also given the Karel Čapek Medal for translation in 2014 due to her entire 24 body work from the Magyar language into Norwegian.

Kemény died in Oslo on 21 April 2021, aged 71.
