= Helge Hagerup =

Norwegian playwright, poet and novelist

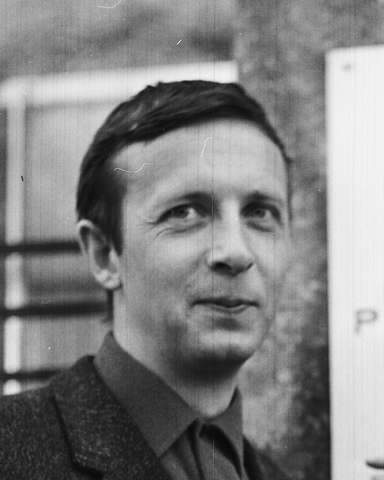
Helge Hagerup

Helge Hagerup (21 April 1933 – 12 August 2008) was a Norwegian playwright, poet and novelist. He was born in Trondheim, a son of Inger Hagerup, and brother of Klaus Hagerup. He made his literary debut in 1949 with the short story collection Vi fem i annen etasje. He was best known as playwright. Among his plays staged at Nationaltheatret are Løfter om kjærlighet from 1960, Superboy from 1968, and Camp from 1976. He was awarded the Prix Italia in 1973 for his audio play Den dagen du aldri skal glemme. He also wrote crime fiction, and the collection Hvorfor skrek morderen? was published in 1982.
