= Ragnar Hovland =

Norwegian novelist, essayist, poet, and writer

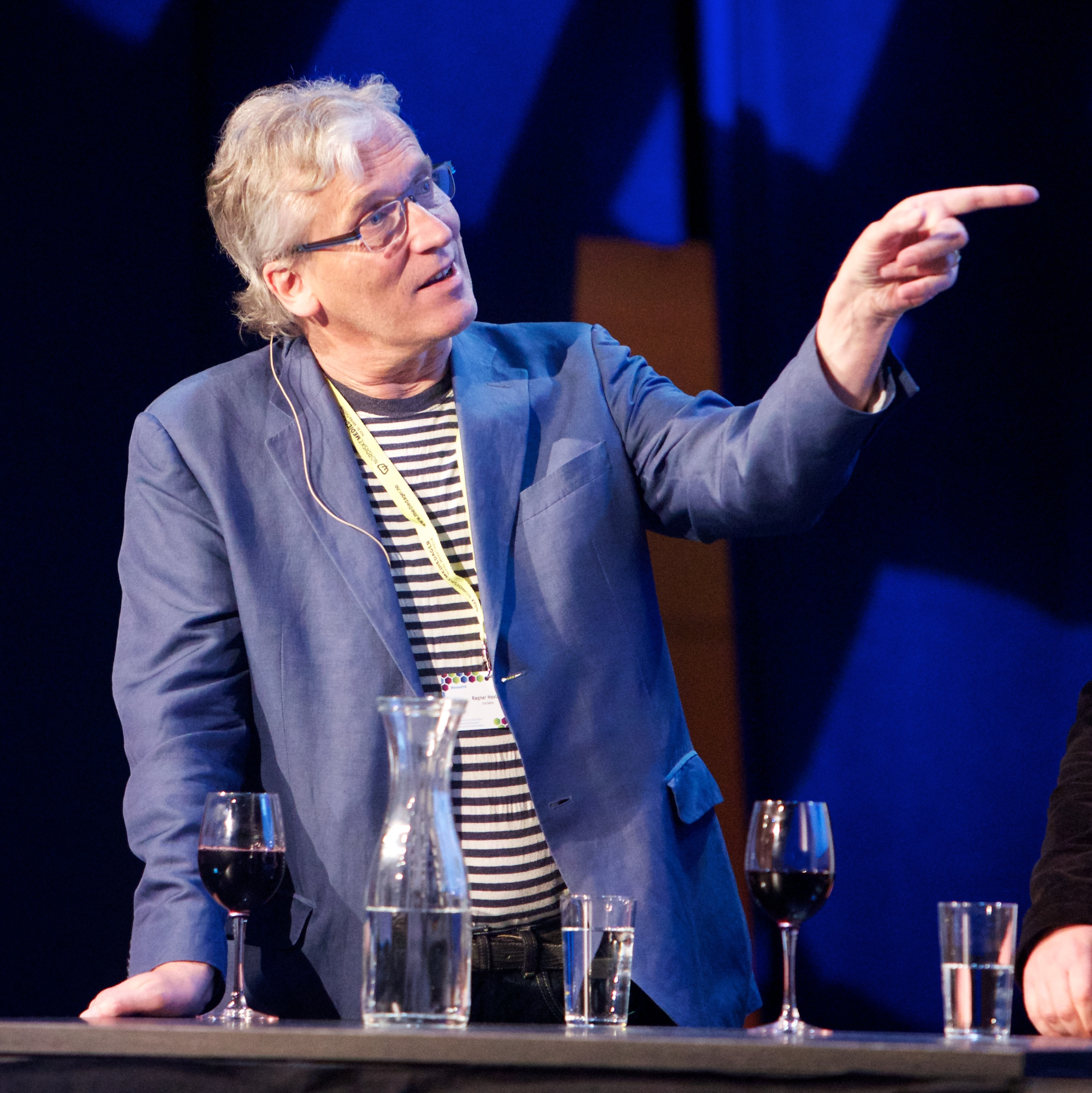
- Hovland in 2013
- Born: 15 April 1952 (age 74); Bergen, Norway
- Occupations: novelist, essayist, poet and children's writer
- Relatives: Ragnvald Indrebø (grandfather)
- Awards: Brage Prize (1992); Norwegian Critics Prize for Literature (2001); Dobloug Prize (2008); Bastian Prize for Children's and Young-Adult Books (2008)

Ragnar Hovland (born 15 April 1952 in Bergen) is a Norwegian novelist, essayist, poet, and writer of children's books.

== Personal life ==
Hovland was born in Bergen to priest Håkon Hovland and schoolteacher Sigrid Indrebø, and grew up in Strandvik Municipality and Luster Municipality. He was married to Sabine Angelika Rolka from 1978 to 1992, and to Tove Olaug Bakke since 1996.

== Career ==
Hovland made his literary debut in 1979, with the novel Alltid fleire dagar. The book follows four young boys from secondary school to college. Their interests circle around rock music, alcohol, a dose of politics and girls.

He followed up with the short story collection Vegen smal og porten trang (1981). The collection includes the stories "Dei siste beat-poetane i Midthordaland", where two wannabe poets are expelled from the gang and instead read their works for a herd of wet sheep; further "Sommarens blå flygel", where two young lovers are surprised by the boy's father, who expresses concern that they could catch a cold since they lie naked on the ground. In the surrealistic story "Songen om Emilia", a young man finds a dead body on the floor three days in a row, and is unable to get rid of the corps, even if he pushes them into the cupboard every time.

The novel Sveve over vatna (1982) is set in Bergen, and the protagonist is a student who gets involved in various strange adventures.

He was awarded the Brage Prize in 1992 for the children's book Ein motorsykkel i natta. He received the Norwegian Critics Prize for Literature in 2001, for the novel Ei vinterreise.

== Awards ==
- Brage Prize 1992.
- Norwegian Critics Prize for Literature 2001
- Dobloug Prize 2008
- Bastian Prize for Children's and Young-Adult Books 2008

== Bibliography ==
About Ragnar Hovland

- Halvor Folgerø og Finn Tokvam Ler dei no, så har eg vunne: møte med Ragnar Hovland 2012

By Ragnar Hovland

- Stille natt (novel) 2011
- Kunsten å komme heim og andre essay (essays) 2011
- Dr. Munks popleksikon (reference work / autobiography) 2008
- Fredlaus (children's and youth book) 2006, 2008
- 1964 (novel) 2006, 2007
- Brevet 2006
- Verdt å vite (trur eg) (essays) 2002
- Norske gleder (essays) 2002
- Ei vinterreise 2001
- Psst! : kubanske notat (poems) 2000
- Åleine i Alpane 1999
- Halve sanninga. Tre versjonar 1998
- Detektivforteljing (Children's book) 1998
- Guillaume Appollinaire 1996
- Norrøne gudar 1996
- Dr. Munks testamente (novel) 1996
- Katten til Ivar Aasen møter hunden frå Baskerville (poems, Children's book) 1996
- Eline og Julie tar ferja (novel) 1994
- Ein dag i Sherwoodskogen (Children's book) 1994
- Bjørnen Alfred og hunden Samuel forlet pappkartongen (Children's book) 1993
- Over Bali og Hawaii (drama) 1992
- Ei lang reise (Children's book) 1992
- Ein motorsykkel i natta (novel) 1992
- Gjest Bårdsen døyr åleine ved Nilens breidd 1992
- Paradis (novel) 1991
- Novelleår (red.) 1990
- Konspirasjoner (essays) 1990
- Sjølvmord i Skilpaddekaféen (novel) 1989
- Mercedes (Young adult) 1989
- Skrivestadier 1989
- Utanfor sesongen 1988
- Love me tender (drama) 1988
- Emil og kaffikokaren (Children's book) 1987
- Sjømannen, tante Elida og dei største eventyr (Children's book) 1986
- Elefantmusikken (poems) 1985
- Professor Moreaus løyndom (novel) 1985
- Bussen til Peking (novel) 1984
- Jakta på Salamanderen (Children's book) 1983
- Under snøen (novel) 1983
- Sveve over vatna (novel) 1982, 1988, 1995, 2008
- Vegen smal og porten trang 1981
- Den flygjande sykkelen og andre forteljingar (Children's book) 1981
- Dei siste beat-poetane i Midthordaland (novella) 1981
- Det får stå til (Children's book) 1980
- Alltid fleire dagar (novel) 1979, 1978

Awards
New award	Recipient of the Brage Prize for children and youth 1992	Succeeded by Torill Eide
