= Merete Alfsen =

Norwegian translator (born 1950)

- Born: 14 February 1950 (age 76)
- Occupation: Translator
- Spouse: Terje Rød-Larsen (m. 1971; div. 1982)
- Awards: Bastian Prize (1994); Norwegian Critics Prize for Literature (2011); Norwegian Academy Prize in memory of Thorleif Dahl (2016)

Merete Alfsen (born 14 February 1950) is a Norwegian translator.

== Career ==
Alfsen started working as translator in 1981, and has translated more than ninety books into Norwegian language. She has previously been literary critic for the newspaper Dagbladet, and freelancer host for the radio shows Nitimen and Reiseradioen.

== Personal life ==
Alfsen was born on 14 February 1950, a daughter of engineer Petter Alfsen and Torill Riise-Hansen. She was married to diplomat Terje Rød-Larsen from 1971 to 1982.

== Awards ==
- 1992: Norwegian culture and church department's translator prize for child and youth literature for her translation of John Marsden's So much to tell you [Så mye å si deg]
- 1994: Bastian Prize in 1994, for her translation of Virginia Woolf's novel Orlando into Norwegian.
- 1997: The Book Club's fiction translator prize [Bokklubbenes skjønnlitterære oversetterpris]
- 2006: Bastian Prize for child and youth literature for her translation of William Nicholson's The Wind Singer [Vindsangeren]
- 2011: Norwegian Critics Prize for Literature in 2011, for translation of A. S. Byatt's novel The Children's Book into Norwegian langue.
- 2016: Norwegian Academy Prize in memory of Thorleif Dahl.

Awards
| Preceded by Karin Gundersen | Recipient of the Bastian Prize; 1994 | Succeeded by Nils Ivar Agøy |
