= Stefán Sigurðsson =

Icelandic poet (1887–1933)

Stefán Sigurðsson (16 or 11 October 1887 – 7 March 1933), also known as Stefán frá Hvítadal (Stefán from Hvítadal) was an Icelandic poet. His most widely known work is a poem written for his daughter Erla; Erla góða Erla. He was born in Hólmavík but grew up in Hvítadal.

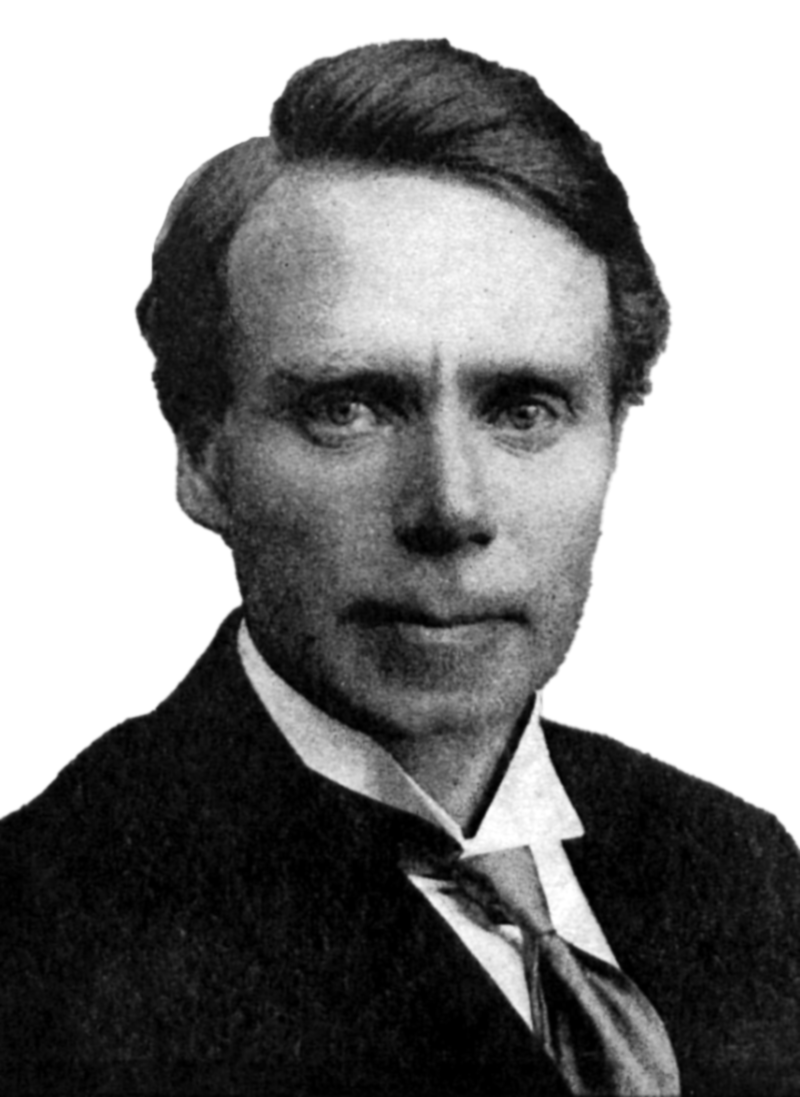
Stefán Sigurðsson

== Selected publications ==
- Stefán frá Hvítadal. (1919) Söngvar Förumannsins (Songs of the vagabond). Reykjavík: Bókaverzlun Ársæls Árnasonar
- Stefán frá Hvítadal. (1921) Óður einyrkjans. Reykjavík: Prentsmiðjan Gutenberg
- Stefán frá Hvítadal. (1924) Heilög kirkja : sextug drápa. Reykjavík: Prentuð í Acta
- Stefán frá Hvítadal. (1927) Helsingjar. Reykjavík: Félagsprentsmiðjan
- Stefán frá Hvítadal. (1930) Anno domini 1930. Reykjavík

== Additional sources ==
- Stevens, Patrick J. (2004) Icelandic Writers. Farmington Hills, MI: Thomson/Gale
- Orgland, Ivar (1990) Stefán Fra Hvítadal Og Noregur: Rannsókn Á Norskum Áhrifum Á Íslenskt Ljóðskáld Á 20. Öld. Reykjavík: Bókaútgáfa Menningarsjóðs
