= Hilde Hagerup =

Norwegian writer (born 1976)

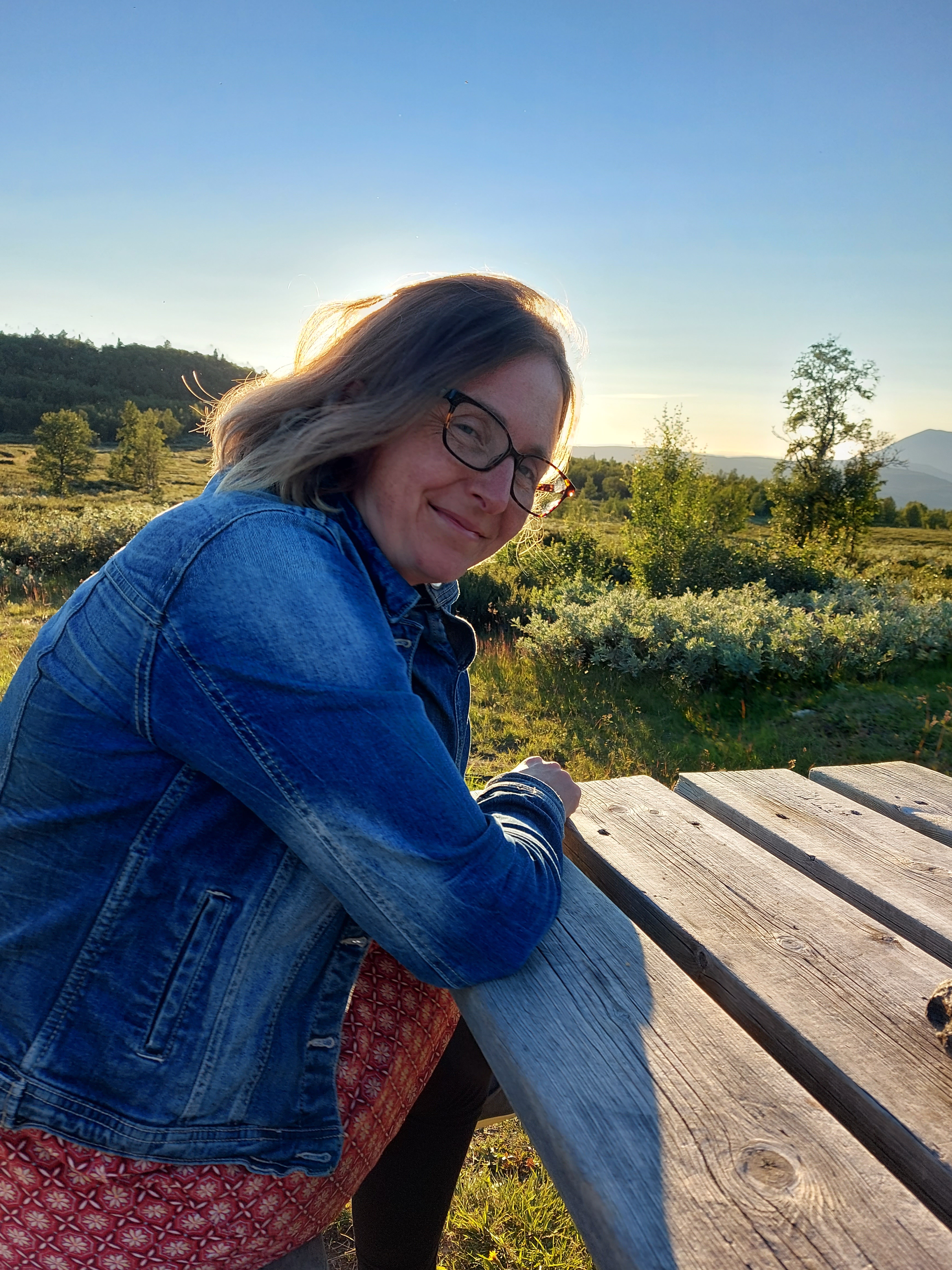
- Born: 26 February 1976 (age 49); Tromsø, Norway
- Occupations: Novelist, children's writer
- Father: Klaus Hagerup
- Relatives: Inger Hagerup (grandmother)
- Awards: Norwegian Critics Prize for Literature (2002); Brage Prize (2025)

Hilde Hagerup (born 26 February 1976) is a Norwegian novelist and author of children's literature. Her awards include the Norwegian Critics Prize for Literature from 2002, and the Brage Prize in 2025.

== Personal life and education ==
Born in Tromsø on 26 February 1976, Hagerup is the daughter of Klaus Hagerup, and granddaughter of Inger Hagerup. She grew up outside the city of Fredrikstad, moved to Wales, and then Oxford, and later settled in Nesodden. She has studied history of the third world at the University of London.

== Career ==
Hagerup has mostly written books for young adults and children, and also for adults.

She made her literary debut in 1998 with Bølgebiter, a book for young adults. She received the Norwegian Critics Prize for Best children's book in 2002 for Løvetannsang.

In 2018 she wrote a biography of Anne Karin Elstad.

Her novel Du eneste, based on the relation between Gunvor Hofmo and Ruth Maier, earned her the Riksmål Society prize for children's and young adults' literature in 2025. She also received the Brage Prize for Children's and young adult literature (2025), for this book.
