= Tommy Watz =

Norwegian translator (1958–2019)

Tommy Watz (1958 – 2 January 2019) was a Norwegian translator.

He grew up in Sinsen and Bekkelaget, and took his education at Oslo Cathedral School and the University of Oslo, specializing in the Italian language and Italian literature. He taught Italian literature at the University despite not completing a master's degree, but became a prolific translator. He was awarded the Bastian Prize in 2013 for translating Alberto Moravia's Gli indifferenti.
