= Ivar Eskeland =

Norwegian philologist (1927–2005)

Ivar Eskeland (30 November 1927 – 23 December 2005) was a Norwegian philologist, publisher, translator, biographer, literary critic, newspaper editor, theatre worker, radio personality and organizational leader.

== Career ==
He was born in Stord Municipality as a son of headmaster Severin Eskeland (1880–1964) and Olga Dorothea Olsen (1886–1975). He was a nephew of Lars Eskeland. He finished his secondary education at Valler, graduated from Stord Teachers' College in 1949 and from the University of Oslo in 1955 with the cand.philol. degree.

He was hired as secretary-general of Noregs Mållag in 1955, then worked for the publishing house Fonna Forlag from 1956 to 1960, for Det Norske Teatret from 1960 to 1965 before editing the newspaper Dag og Tid from 1965 to 1966. He was also a freelance teacher at the Norwegian National Academy of Theatre in the 1960s. In language organizations, he was the deputy chairman of Noregs Mållag from 1957 to 1960 and chairman from 1960 to 1963, and member of the Vogt Committee between 1965 and 1967.

From 1968 to 1972 he was the director of the Nordic House in Iceland, and from 1972 to 1974 he directed the Secretariat for Nordic Cultural Cooperation. He translated Halldór Laxness and William Heinesen, wrote a textbook in Icelandic and biographies of Gisle Straume and Snorri Sturluson. For this he was decorated with the Order of the Falcon in 1971 and the Bastian Prize in 1972. He was also chairman of the Broadcasting Council from 1963 to 1968, the Norwegian Association of Literary Translators from 1965 to 1968 and 1978 to 1986, and the Norwegian Critics' Association from 1975 to 1981. He was an honorary member of the Norwegian Association of Literary Translators and Noregs Mållag. He was also a radio personality known for his causeries, and a literary critic. From 1985 to 1986 he was director in the publishing house Forlaget Atheneum.

Eskeland was married twice. He died in December 2005 in Oslo. He was decorated as a Grand Knight with Star of the Icelandic Order of the Falcon.

== Selected works ==
- Den norske oljesjel : kåseri. Illustrated by Jan O. Henriksen. Oslo: Aventura. 1985. ISBN 9788258803703. OCLC 14128557.

Cultural offices
| Preceded by Trygve Bjørgo; Magne Skodvin | Chairman of Noregs Mållag; 1960–1963 | Succeeded by Trygve Bjorgo |
Awards
| Preceded by Axel Amlie | Recipient of the Bastian Prize; 1972 | Succeeded by Trond Winje |
