= Per Qvale =

Norwegian translator

Per Qvale (born 1946) is a Norwegian translator and literary historian.

He was born in Oslo. After studying in Oslo, Bergen and Tübingen, he was an auxiliary teacher of philosophy at the University of Oslo from 1974 to 1977 and took the mag.art. degree in 1981 with a thesis on Lars Gustafsson's Sprickorna i muren. Qvale's career as a translator from English, German and Swedish started in 1972. From 1986 to 1990 he chaired the Norwegian Association of Literary Translators. His book about the theory and practice of translation, Fra Hieronymus til hypertekst. Oversettelse i teori og praksis (1998), was published in English as From St. Jerome to Hypertext (Manchester 2003). He published the essay collection Det umuliges kunst in 1991 on Aschehoug, followed by the essay collection Samarkand, Sarabande, Sarajevo (2011) and the novels Trabant (2013) and Orvil (2020), both on Bokvennen.

He was awarded the Bokklubbenes skjønnlitterære oversetterpris in 2002 for translating The Magic Mountain and the Bastian Prize in 2008 for translating Lotte in Weimar (1939), both books by Thomas Mann. In 2013 he received the Letterstedtska föreningens nordiska översättarpris. He was nominated for the Rosetta Prize in 2023. He was a jury member of the Bastian Prize as well as the Riksmål Society Literature Prize.

Qvale was inducted into the Norwegian Academy in 2007.
