= Tynset (novel) =

1965 lyrical work of prose by Wolfgang Hildesheimer

Tynset is a lyrical work of prose published in 1965 by the German writer Wolfgang Hildesheimer. Often described as a novel, although not by Hildesheimer himself, it is a monologue of the thoughts of an insomniac over the course of a sleepless night. The central theme of Tynset, one of Hildesheimer's major works, is resignation in face of an absurd world. The first-person narrator from Tynset is also found in other works by Hildesheimer, and displays similarities with Hildesheimer himself. The work is named after Tynset Municipality in Norway, which the narrator imagines travelling to.

The book was a bestseller upon publication, attracted strong attention in the contemporary press, and was translated into several languages, but did not match the popularity of Hildesheimer's Lieblose Legenden ("Loveless legends"). Hildesheimer was awarded the 1966 Bremen Literature Prize for Tynset.

== Content ==
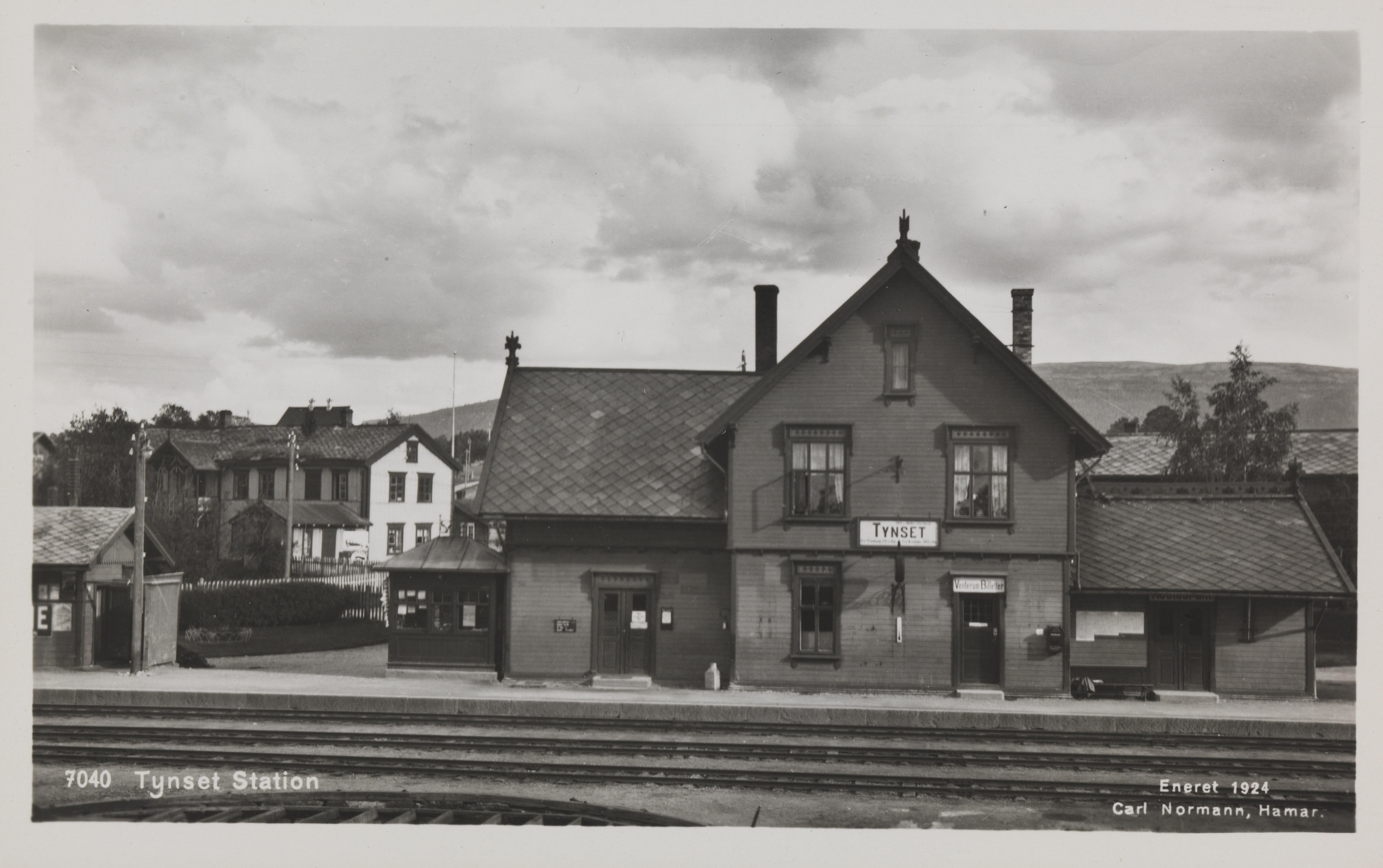
Tynset station in 1924

I'm lying in bed, in my winter bed. It's time to sleep. But when wouldn't it be?

— Wolfgang Hildesheimer, Tynset

These words begin the anonymous first-person narrator monologue of an insomniac which constitutes Tynset. The narrator, whose circumstances strongly resemble those of Wolfgang Hildesheimer himself, allows his thoughts to wander, he relates his memories, wishes and fears, the people around him, and dives into the history of both of his antique beds. But Tynset is a stream of associations rather than actual events. After the narrator considers the sounds and smells he senses, he gropes "blindly onto my bedside table in search of something to read". He puts a telephone directory back down, then picks up and reads a 1963 timetable of the Norwegian State Railways.

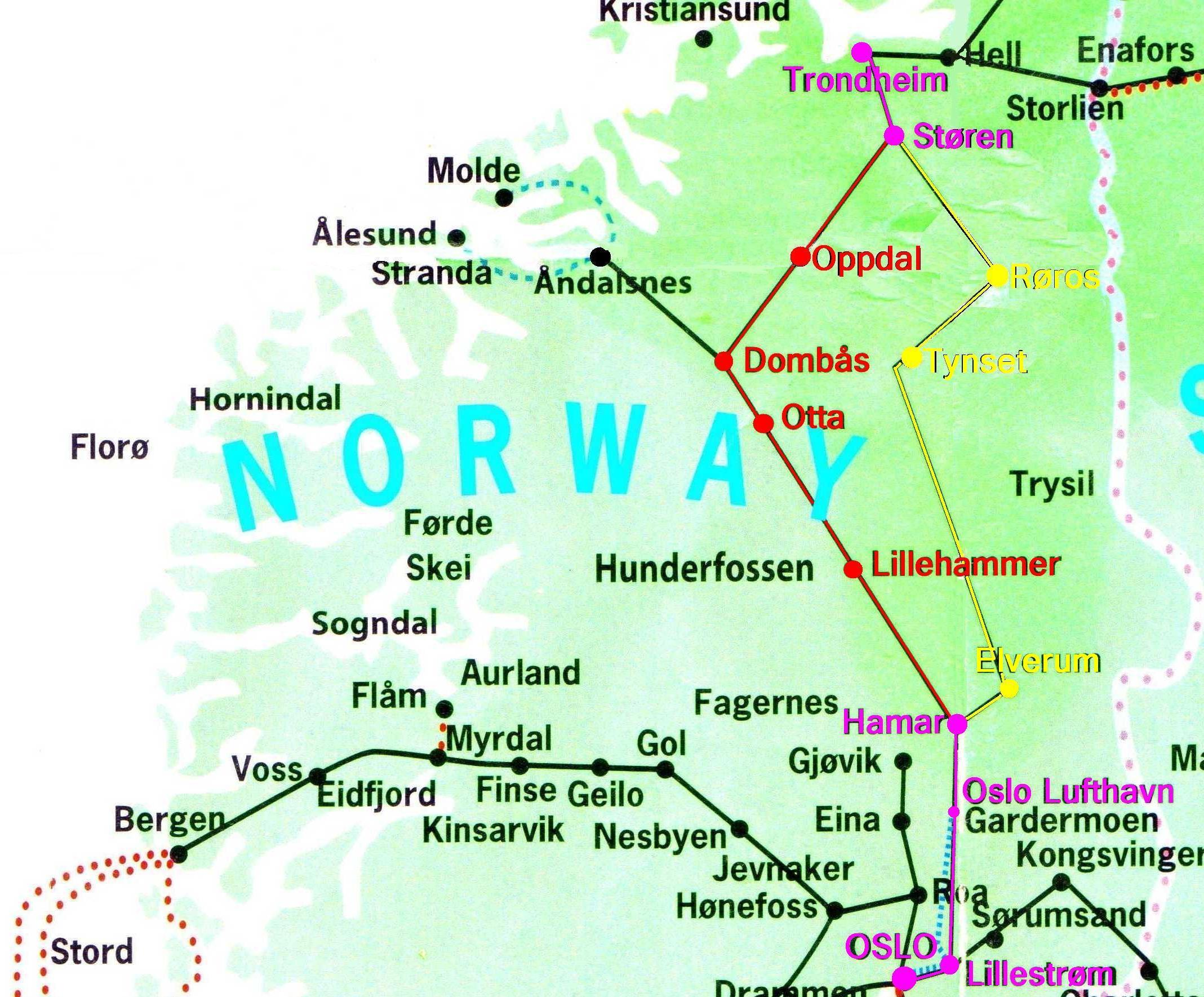
Map of Norwegian railway lines mentioned in Tynset

He finds "a branch line that runs from Hamar to Stören, passing through Elverum, Tynset, and Røros". He contemplates the sound of the station names and the images they evoke in him. He is particularly fascinated by Tynset, where he has never been. He later determines to go to Tynset, but he becomes distracted as he gets up to go through the house, up to the top floor past where Hamlet's father often stands.

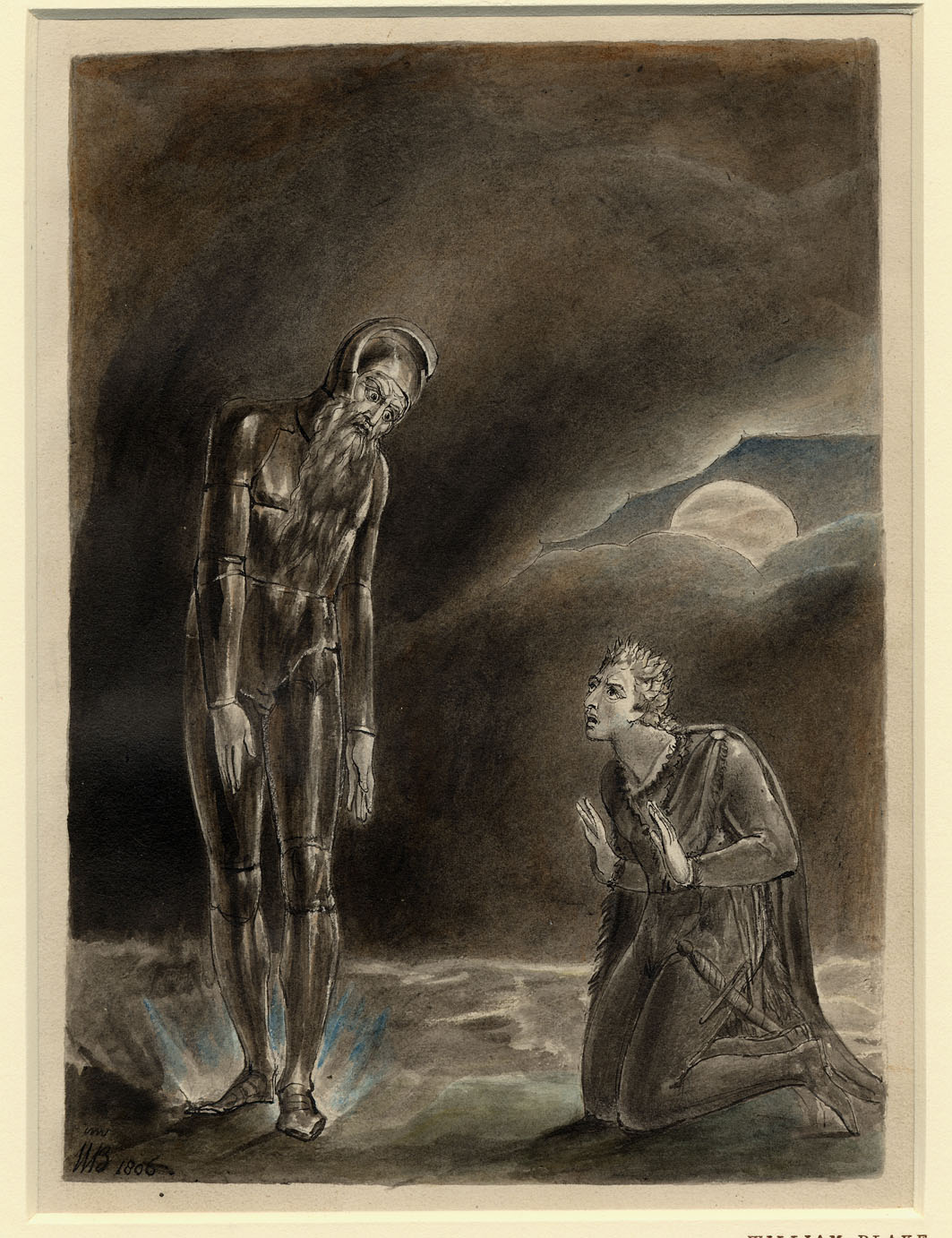
Hamlet and his Father's Ghost, William Blake, 1806

The meaning that this initially perplexing figure has for the narrator later becomes clearer, in that he compares himself to Hamlet, and mentions that his father had been murdered. Like the ghost in Shakespeare's play, Hamlet's father is admonishment of the inaction of the narrator.

After reflecting on his alcohol-addicted and very pious housekeeper Celestina, the narrator returns to the telephone directory and describes how, when he still used to live in Germany, he would ring up people at random in the middle of the night and tell them that "they know everything, everything. Do you understand? I would advise you to leave now, while you still have time". Sometimes he could even observe how people living nearby subsequently flee their home. His last call, under the name Bloch, was to Kabasta – a man, whose existence, "a terrible one", he already knew. We later learn that Kabasta had killed a man called Bloch in the war. But unlike the others, Kabasta is not so easily scared, and uses his connections to the authorities. The narrator becomes convinced that his telephone is being tapped. He soon not only leaves the house, but also Germany. Following descriptions of the late-autumn weather, and a representative of the evangelical revivalist movement frozen to death in his car in a snow storm on a nearby mountain pass, the narrator returns to the telephone directory. He relates an attempt to create his own telephone directory with fictitious names, and via a chain of association arrives at "Doris Wiener, who had an operation to even her nose and make it smaller" and who fell victim to the Nazi terror along with her husband, Bloch, who was forced to dig his own grave under Kabasta's supervision.

There follows a digression with the Cocks of Attica: "to hear them crowing, I climbed up to the Acropolis one evening. Hildesheimer recreates the scene described in The Colossus of Maroussi where a pre-dawn concert of cocks is initiated by one loud "cock-a-doodle-doo" call from the Acropolis. After further digressions, he finally determines to travel to Tynset. However, the narrator becomes concerned about the obstacles that could be in his way: "I will do my best to avoid all other cities on the way: Prada, Chur and Stuttgart, Hannover and – was it Hannover?" – the list locates the narrator in Poschiavo (to which the locality Prada belongs) in the Swiss Canton of Graubünden, where Hildesheimer lived from 1957. This results in a nightmarish description of a car journey through a labyrinthine German state capital, a lot like Hannover but named Wilhelmstadt by the narrator, which is almost impossible to escape from due to bewildering signposting.

The narrator wants to hear the automated street status report, but rings the wrong number and gets a cooking recipe, he recalls the visit of a cardinal to Rosenheim to inaugurate something there, he lies down again in his bed and it turns midnight.

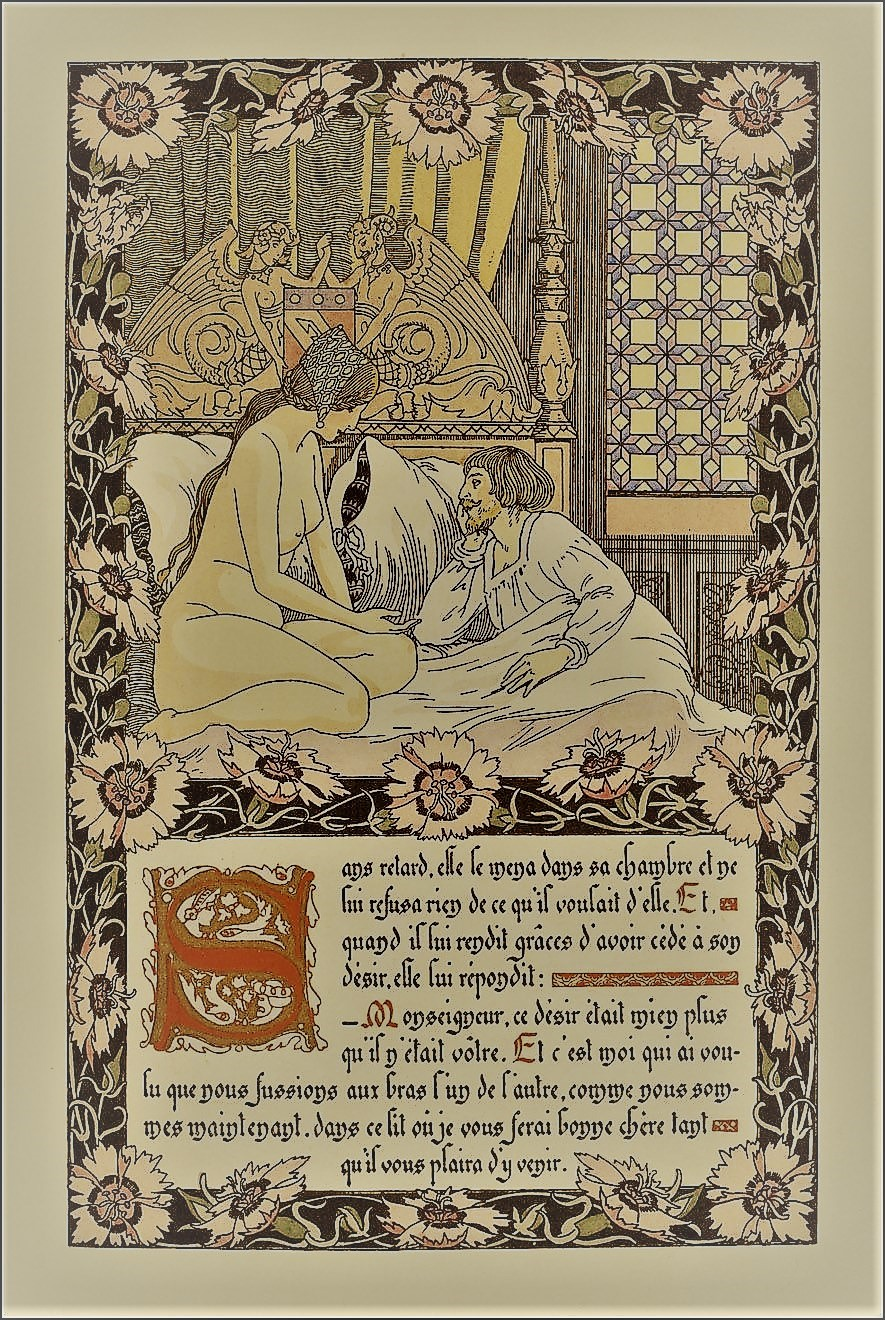
1902 illustration of Gesualdo's wife Maria d'Avalos and her lover Fabrizio Carafa

Now he describes his winter bed, "in which, before me, nobody had lain for one hundred twenty thousand nights. I bought it from some rich boy who had inherited it from his parents", as the bed in which the Italian composer Carlo Gesualdo murdered his first wife and her lover, and pictures the moment of death of the lovers in long, lyrical sentences, until his thoughts suddenly turn back to Tynset. Tynset increasingly becomes a special place for the narrator:

Tynset can never be completely dark, for while the blackness of night may serve to obscure the trivial and the superficial, it allows more mysterious qualities to shine forth, qualities that Tynset still possesses –

even if only for me. For others it's just Tynset, and for most not even that.

— Wolfgang Hildesheimer, Tynset

Still sleepless, the narrator rises to get another bottle of red wine, and once more goes around the house in contemplation. In a longer episode, he remembers the last party held in the house, and how Wesley B. Prosniczer, an uninvited American revivalist preacher, hijacked it with proselytist intentions, and alienates the narrator from his guests because they believe the narrator has orchestrated his appearance. Prosniczer is the only party guest that the narrator sees again, frozen to death in his car attempting to cross the mountain pass, as mentioned at the beginning of Tynset.

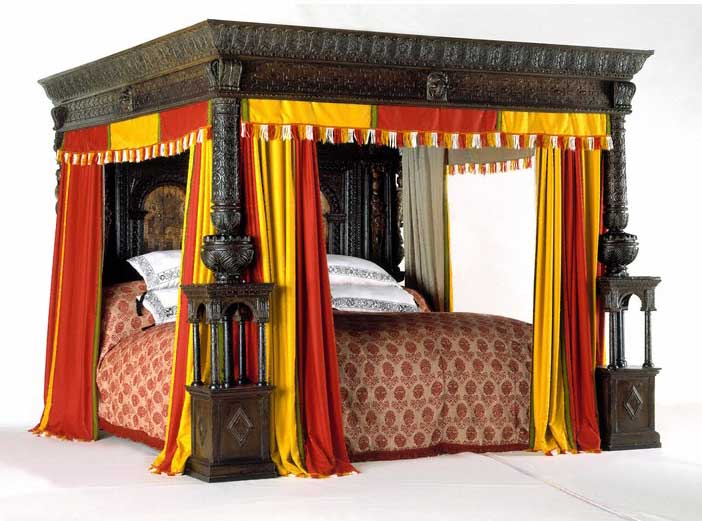
Bed of Ware

After a while, the narrator decides to visit his summer bed. This is a large Renaissance bed from an English inn, which he compares to the Great Bed of Ware, somewhat older, and with room for seven people. The narrator describes the last time that seven people slept in the bed in 1522, how they arrive as guests at the inn, their backgrounds and characters, and how they all die of the Black Death in the bed that night. There again follows the motif of his housekeeper Celestina, her drunkenness and religiousness when the narrator finds her drinking in the kitchen. In her stupor she takes him for God and asks for his blessing, which he attempts with clumsy gestures and words, but this only ends in disappointment when she realises her delusion.

The narrator once again considers his "underdeveloped aim: Tynset. Tynset, the only place for which I would leave my house, and my bed, my winter bed, the white realm - and even then it would be with a heavy heart." Back in his winter bed, he again thinks about Gesualdo, also about Celestina. He listens to the street status report on the telephone and finally falls asleep. As he awakes it is light and snow has fallen, turned early winter. Tynset is for him now "Gone, finished. It's too late. No more about that. In snow like this I never would have gotten to Tynset, never." He considers attending the funeral of a child which the town bells herald. The narrator decides not to travel to Tynset, and not to go to the child's funeral, but to continue to lie in his winter bed:

in this bed of winter nights, of moonlit nights, of dark nights, the bed in which I am lying yet again, deep under the covers despite the light of day, the bed in which I will lie forever and from which I will let Tynset disappear – I can see it fading into the distance, it is already far away, and now it is gone, the name forgotten, swept up by the wind, like an echo, like smoke, like a final breath –

— Wolfgang Hildesheimer, Tynset

== Context ==
Tynset is part of a monologic body of work that Hildesheimer began in 1962 with Vergebliche Aufzeichnungen ("Useless notes"), and concluded with Zeiten in Cornwall ("Times in Cornwall") (1971) and Masante (1973). Tynset continually references Hamlet, which contains the most famous monologues in world literature. Although Tynset is often described as a (lyrical) novel, including by Patricia Haas Stanley, the American specialist in German studies, Hildesheimer himself regarded this classification as inappropriate, and described the book as an antinovel and wrote "what it became, I know not". He preferred to call Tynset and Masante "monologues", yet firmly insisted that monologue is not a literary genre. Although Masante appeared after Zeiten in Cornwall, the latter constitutes the "newer state of development" according to the history of Hildesheimer's work by Volker Jehle because Masante should originally have appeared earlier. These works have in common a first-person narrator, the "reflecter", who first appears in Schläferung ("Somnolence"), the last of Hildesheimer's Lieblose Legenden. Whereas Hildesheimer leaves the narrator in Tynset lying at home, unable to break out, in Masante he is sent out into the desert where he presumably dies, Zeiten in Cornwall is a directly autobiographical recollection of Hildesheimer's stays in Cornwall in 1939 and 1946. The literature scholar Morton Münster places Tynset in Hildesheimer's middle "absurd" phase, before his "satirical" phase, and after renouncing the poetics of the absurd.

== Themes, motifs and biographical background ==
=== Resignation in face of the absurd ===
Hildesheimer's novels, in addition to his plays, stand in the tradition of the Theatre of the Absurd. In Tynset as well as Masante, and in Hildesheimer's final literary work Mitteilungen an Max über den Stand der Dinge und anderes ("Notes to Max about the state of affairs and other things") there is "doubt about the language and purpose of life", although in Tynset this doubt is still in its early stages. The narrator, "a passive spectator in a world without answers", as he comes across a prie-dieu in his furniture, compares himself with Hamlet: "I am Hamlet, I see my uncle Claudius, cowering before the kneeler […] but I do not kill him; I restrain myself, I do not act - others act, but I do not". Faced with an incoherent and senseless life in an absurd world, Hildesheimer's narrator reacts with melancholy and resignation. He also anticipates resignation in his readers. So according to Hildesheimer, as Günter Blamberger describes, it is the didactic purpose of absurdist fiction "that people learn to live in the absurd, come to terms with the irrationality of life, that they can bear with dignity the despondency over the silence of the world, and embrace it as a lasting attitude to life“. According to Blamberger, Hildesheimer demonstrates in Tynset and Masante "that the path of absurd literature, which does not commit to the practical philosophy of Camus, but rather continues the search for truth, ends in silence from stalemate in the crisis."

In a 1973 interview with Dieter E. Zimmer to accompany the publication of Masante, Wolfgang Hildesheimer said he can only write about himself. The main themes of Tynset are resignation and isolation. When asked what the narrator in Tynset does during the day, Hildesheimer replied "he won't do much", spoke of "retreat from life", and a certain identification with Hildesheimer himself.

=== Truth and fiction ===
Jeffrey Castle claims that "much of Hildesheimer's work can be said to question and challenge the boundary between truth and fiction, constantly prompting the reader to wonder which is which, and to ponder over the relationship between the two." The many digressions in Tynset combine meticulous historical research with fictional storytelling, such as the stories associated with the winter and summer beds. This interweaving of fact and fiction likely influenced the work of W. G. Sebald.

=== Fear ===
Fear is another key motif in Tynset, as it is in Hildesheimer's later novel Masante. In 1964 Hildesheimer, who left Germany for the second time and for good in 1957, answered the question why he doesn't live in Germany with "I'm a jew. Two-thirds of all Germans are antisemites. They always were and always will be." Fear of persecution recurs throughout Tynset, as well as brutality. In his vision of a car journey through "Wilhelmstadt", the narrator avoids eye contact with other drivers when stopped at traffic lights – "True, sometimes they are gazing off into the distance too, dreaming of being somewhere else, but oftentimes you find yourself alongside a thug, or a murderer – I have glimpsed many a horrid past while waiting at traffic lights." Henry A. Lea observes that the most striking aspect of the Wilhelmstadt episode is the fear and alienation of the narrator, his description of the city as "a labyrinth and fortress of unrestrained nationalism", whose fortifications have been maintained over five centuries "to trap the likes of me". For Lea, the description evokes an image of an archetypal German city in which outsiders are not welcome, and where he doesn't want to be.

On the final page, as the narrator once more thinks about his winter bed and the murderer Gesualdo who lay in it, he adds: "a murderer, but not a defender of the Order or a spreader of reddish yellow hands, no skinner, no retiree from Schleswig-Holstein, and no bone-breaking patriarch from Vienna, no hangman, no shooter". Even his own German name gives him the creeps – he's not named, but there is a presumption that he's called Wolfgang –, a name "with an embarrassing undertone, originating in some faraway, pre-historic depth, a foggy darkness I have always been afraid to look into". Morton Münster claims that since Tynset, Hildesheimer's first-person narrator "is running from the indescribable, namely Auschwitz".

=== Death ===
Wolfgang Hildesheimer's novel Tynset appears...to come from the heart of sorrow itself.

— W. G. Sebald

Death is ever-present, from the ghost of Hamlet's father to the 15 deaths described over the course of the book. The winter and summer beds dominate the book, but they are not slept in, they are death beds. Jehle describes the scenes as "picture artist musical composition exercises", with the summer bed story a seven-part "death fugue" and "danse macabre". Gesualdo's dying throes are in the same bed that he murdered his wife and her lover, but Gesualdo at least lived out his life. Practically all of the other deaths in the book are premature, from murder, plague, or accident, and the book ends with the funeral of a child. None of the deaths are mourned. The narrator wants to go to the church for there to be at least someone to accompany the child's final journey, but he cannot bring himself to leave his bed. The child is past knowing, "but death, death would take note, the scoundrel. He would think that I had come to pay him my respects, which would certainly not have been the case - no, most certainly not". The only mourners in the book are make believe ones, actors at Ophelia's funeral in Hamlet.

I have died many times, but these days I don't do it as often. Eventually it will have to be the last time [...] Now however, I know that the next death will be the last one.

— Wolfgang Hildesheimer, Tynset

=== Guilt ===
Jehle sees everyone in Tynset apart from the narrator as guilty. The narrator proclaims his innocence despite being haunted by the ghost of Hamlet's father, and Celestina turns to alcohol to cope with her guilty secret. Everyone the narrator rings in Germany is riddled with guilt, and flees at the anonymous telephone warning. Hildesheimer has intimate knowledge of German guilt from his work as an interpreter at the Nuremberg trials from 1947 to 1949. On 5 February 1947, even before his first assignment, he wrote to his parents: "The material that you're given, and also the witness statements you hear from the doctors' trials, sometimes exceeds anything imaginable".

Tynset ends with the resignation of the narrator pressed into his bed, according to Jehle, an innocent "in a world of the guilty" for whom only "retreat, isolation, and flight remains".

I will let Tynset go, forget it, repress it, yes, I will abandon the game and the riddle and treat it like pure chance, like everything is in perfect order.

— Wolfgang Hildesheimer, Tynset

== Style and structure ==
The style of Tynset is characterised by precise descriptions. According to Henry A. Lea, Hildesheimer's German is polished and free of regional colouring. Patricia Haas Stanley classifies Hildesheimer's literary language in Tynset as verbal music, impersonal stories, and reflexive style. Constant throughout is "highly articulate, associational free prose" as well as "verbal and not nominal structure". Stanley compares the structure of the whole work with the rondo in Mozart's 9th Piano Concerto (KV 271):

This Mozart rondo is, in general, a smaller model of Tynset, because in Hildesheimer's adaptation of the form, an expanded structure is created of refrain/episode-change, modified refrains and two cadenzas.

— Patricia Haas Stanley

Possible rondo patterns in the Classical music period include: ABA, ABACA, or ABACABA. The structure of Tynset is ABACBDABADABAEABABDABEDEDCBABA, where:
A is lying in winter bed,
B is Tynset,
C is Celestina,
D is a major digression (i.e. telephone, cocks of Attica, Wilhelmstadt, farewell party, summer bed), and
E is walking around the house.

Stanley identifies "The Cocks of Attica" digression as a further musical element, namely a four-part literary toccata with coda. Hildesheimer himself described this section "as part of the musical structure of my book — with the crescendo and decrescendo of a toccata, with onomatopoeia". Due to Hildesheimer's strict form, Stanley as well as other writers like Maren Jäger distinguish the associational-monologic style of Tynset from a stream of consciousness.

Another feature of Tynset is, as Wolfgang Rath notes, Hildesheimer's "specific peculiar connection of monomanic dejection and satirical wit". Rath comments that a "process of gaining ironic distance" began with Hildesheimer after Tynset; Hildesheimer the satirist, who dominates the narration in later works (Marbot, Mitteilungen an Max) and earlier in the Lieblose Legenden, remains implicit in Tynset.

== Reception ==
=== Contemporary ===
Tynset was Hildesheimer's first work to achieve "overwhelming critical success",. It was reviewed by numerous critics in the year following publication in 1965; while Stanley cites "roughly thirty-five", Jehle claims there were "over 130 major reviews immediately following publication and countless more at the prize ceremonies".

Among other things, style and content comparisons were made with Samuel Beckett, Jean-Paul Sartre, Max Frisch and Djuna Barnes. On this, the reviewers' opinions varied. For example, while Walter Jens in Die Zeit wrote that Hildesheimer had achieved a "triumph" with Tynset, "a classical prose, the most richly nuanced (except for Wolfgang Koeppen) from a German writer since Thomas Mann", Reinhard Baumgart's review in Spiegel was largely negative. Baumgart claimed to have "read a manuscript, a first, ambitious draft" and wrote of a "perplexing juxtaposition of sections which succeed effortlessly, with others which initially reveal nothing but dry exertion, in their language, their thinking, their design". Werner Weber (journalist) pointed out in the Neue Zürcher Zeitung that in 1959 Hildesheimer had translated the novel Nightwood by Djuna Barnes, which is reflected in Tynset. He felt the book was not pleasant to read, and some passages tested his patience, but "even the stretches of laboriously persistent unravelling of a matter or a relationship" are "still touched by the truth of the language and by the truth of their message." With Tynset, Hildesheimer ranks "as one of the best contemporary writers".

Several critics were exercised by the form of Tynset and by the identity of the narrator, such as Baumgart: "a middle way is sought lurching between the truth of the report or diary and the other truth of invention and narration." In his otherwise largely positive review ("But how wonderfully Wolfgang Hildesheimer can tell a story!"), Rudolf Hartung saw the Hamlet motif as a weakness of the book, which all too transparently shows "what the author intended with this motif", and "the not entirely credible utopia of a departure into the unknown".

Commercially, Tynset was a success. The book featured on the bestseller list in the Spiegel for a long time in 1965. In 1966 the Swiss magazine Du (Zeitschrift) claimed that Tynset had made Hildesheimer "famous overnight". In 1966 Hildesheimer was awarded the Literaturpreis der Stadt Bremen and Georg-Büchner-Preis for Tynset.

=== Subsequent ===
Later work on Wolfgang Hildesheimer rank Tynset amongst his major works, such as Henry A. Lea in his 1979 essay, or the Killy Literaturlexikon in 2009, where Tynset is named as a major work of prose together with Masante. However, W. G. Sebald stated in 1983 that Tynset is a novel "which has by far not received the attention and recognition that its inherent qualities deserve". Volker Jehle also wrote in his 1990 history of Hildesheimer works about Tynset as a book "some readers regard as his greatest", that was "never popular" in contrast to Lieblose Legenden.

== Editions ==
- Tynset. Suhrkamp, Frankfurt a. M. 1965.
  - Licensed editions: Ex Libris, Zürich [1971]; Volk und Welt, Berlin 1978 (collection with other works); Dt. Bücherbund, Stuttgart [1993].
- Tynset. Suhrkamp, Frankfurt a. M. 1973. (Bibliothek Suhrkamp; Bd. 365). ISBN 3-518-01365-8
- Tynset. Suhrkamp, Frankfurt a. M. 1992. (Suhrkamp-Taschenbuch; Bd. 1968). ISBN 978-3-518-38468-8
- Tynset. Translated by Jeffrey Castle, Dalkey Archive Press, Victoria TX 2016. ISBN 978-1628971422

The page numbering in the licensed edition of 1971 and in the paperback edition of 1992 correspond to the original edition of 1965. In addition to the individual editions, Tynset is also part of volume 2 Monologische Prosa ("Monologue prose") of the Gesammelte Werke ("Collected works") of Hildesheimer published by Suhrkamp in 1991, ISBN 3-518-40403-2.

The first translation of Tynset – into Norwegian – already appeared in 1966. Åse-Marie Nesse was awarded the Bastian Prize for this translation. There are further translations in at least the following languages: Bulgarian, French, Italian, Japanese, Dutch, Polish, Slovak, Spanish, Czech, and Hungarian. An English translation did not appear until 2016.

== Literature ==
- Stanley, Patricia Haas (1978). Wolfgang Hildesheimers "Tynset" (in German). Meisenheim: Anton Hain. ISBN 3-445-01848-0.
- Lea, Henry A. (1979). "Wolfgang Hildesheimer and the German-Jewish Experience: Reflections on Tynset and Masante". Monatshefte. 71 (1). University of Wisconsin Press. pp. 19–28. JSTOR 30165191.
- Sebald, W. G. (2013). "Konstruktionen der Trauer. Günter Grass und Wolfgang Hildesheimer". Campo Santo (in German) (2 ed.). Frankfurt am Main: Fischer. pp. 101–127. ISBN 978-3-596-16527-8.
- Rath, Wolfgang (1985). Fremd im Fremden : zur Scheidung von Ich und Welt im deutschen Gegenwartsroman (in German). Heidelberg: Winter. ISBN 3-533-03631-6(on Tynset and Masante pp. 79–161)
- Arnold, Heinz Ludwig, ed. (1986). Wolfgang Hildesheimer. Text + Kritik Heft 89/90 (in German). München: Edition Text + Kritik. ISBN 3-88377-220-8.
- Jehle, Volker (1990). Wolfgang Hildesheimer, Werkgeschichte. Suhrkamp-Taschenbuch 2109 (in German). Frankfurt a. M.: Suhrkamp. p. 88. ISBN 3-518-38609-3(on Tynset in particular pp. 88–106) Revised, corrected and updated in 2003, publisher Traugott Bautz (Nordhausen), ISBN 3-88309-114-6, on Tynset pp. 90-109
- Münster, Morton (2013). Das Unsagbare sagen. Ein Vergleich zwischen Wolfgang Hildesheimers »Tynset« und »Masante«, Juan Benets »Herrumbrosas Ianzas« und Mia Coutos »Estórias abensonhadas« (Thesis) (in German). Univ. Tübingen: Stauffenburg. ISBN 978-3-86057-497-3(On Tynset and Masante in particular pp. 95–142)
