= Turid Farbregd =

Norwegian philologist and translator

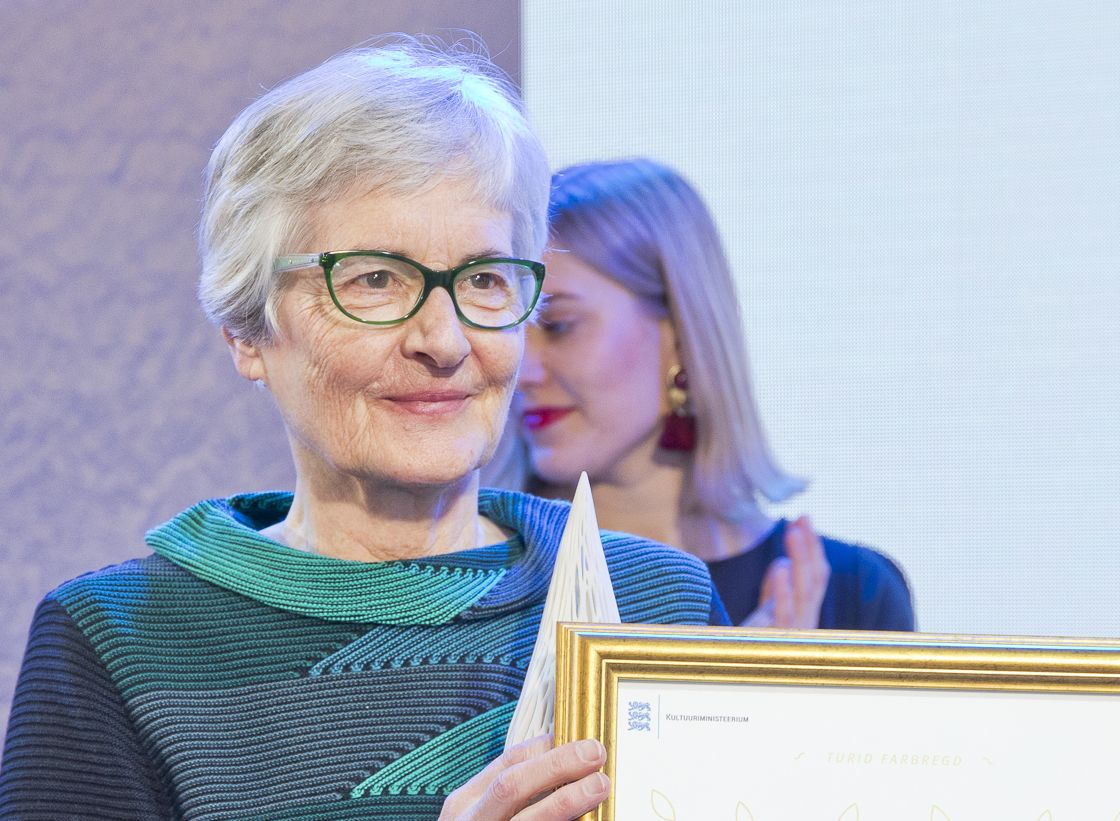
- Born: 8 March 1941 (age 85)
- Education: Philologist
- Occupations: University lecturer, translator, lexicographer
- Awards: Bastian Prize (1989); Norwegian Critics Prize for Literature (2013); Finnish State Award for Foreign Translators (2016); Book Clubs' Literary Translation Prize (2017); The Letterstedt Association's Nordic Translation Prize (2018)

Turid Farbregd (born 8 March 1941) is a Norwegian philologist and translator.

== Career ==
Born in Gjesdal on 8 March 1941, Farbregd was awarded the Bastian Prize in 1989, for her translation of poetry by Jaan Kaplinski into Norwegian language. She received the Norwegian Critics Prize for Literature in 2013, for her translation of Katja Kettu's book Kätilö (The Midwife) into Norwegian.

She was appointed Government scholar in 1995.
