= Johannes Gjerdåker =

Norwegian translator

- Born: 15 February 1936; Voss Municipality, Norway
- Died: 27 April 2020 (aged 84)
- Education: University of Oslo
- Occupations: Local historian Non-fiction writer Poet; Translator
- Awards: Bastian Prize; Melsom Prize; Norwegian Critics Prize for Literature

Johannes Gjerdåker (15 February 1936 – 27 April 2020) was a Norwegian local historian, poet, translator, non-fiction writer and publisher.

Gjerdåker was born in Voss Municipality, and studied history and language at the University of Oslo. He made his literary debut in 1978 with the poetry collection Skot på gamal stuv. He wrote several works on local history of Voss and Hordaland. In 1992 he was awarded the cultural prize from the municipality of Voss. He received the Bastian Prize in 1997 and the Melsom Prize in 1999, both for translation of works by Robert Burns into Nynorsk. In 2005 he received the Critics Prize for the year's best work of translation, for translation of works by Horace. He died in April 2020.
