= Ragnvald Vaage =

Ragnvald Vaage (29 April 1889 – 27 June 1966) was a Norwegian poet, novelist and children's writer.

== Biography ==
He was born at Husnes in Kvinnherred Municipality, Norway. His parents were Ola Larsson Vaage (1844–97) and Ragnhild Larsdotter Oppsanger (1855–89). In 1906 he started at Voss Folk High School (Voss Folkehøgskule) at Seim in Vossavangen where he stayed for two years. Then he spent a year at Jæren and studied horticulture. He later attended Askov College (Askov Højskole) in Vejen.

His first poetry collections were Liv som strir (1912), Bylgja (1913) and Strengspel (1914). Among his children's books are Gutane på Tedneholmen (1923) Den forunderlege vegen (1949), Den gode sumaren (1955) and the prize-winning Stivnakkane (1957). His novel Den vonde draumen (1953) was awarded with Sunnmørsprisen.

He was married in 1916 with Dorothea Raunehaug (1892-1973) and was the grandfather of author and playwright Lars Amund Vaage.

== Awards ==
- Melsom Prize (Melsom-prisen) - 1942 (jointly with Inge Krokann)
- Sunnmør Prize (Sunnmørsprisen) - 1953
