= Fartein Døvle Jonassen =

Norwegian novelist and translator (born 1971)

Fartein Døvle Jonassen (born 10 February 1971) is a Norwegian novelist and translator.

In 2004 he won the Bastian Prize for Children's and Young-Adult Books, for his translation of David Klass' You Don't Know Me. He was later a member of the committee that awards this prize. He has also written two fantasy novels. He resides in Kongsberg.
