= Klaus Hagerup =

Norwegian author, actor and director (1946–2018)

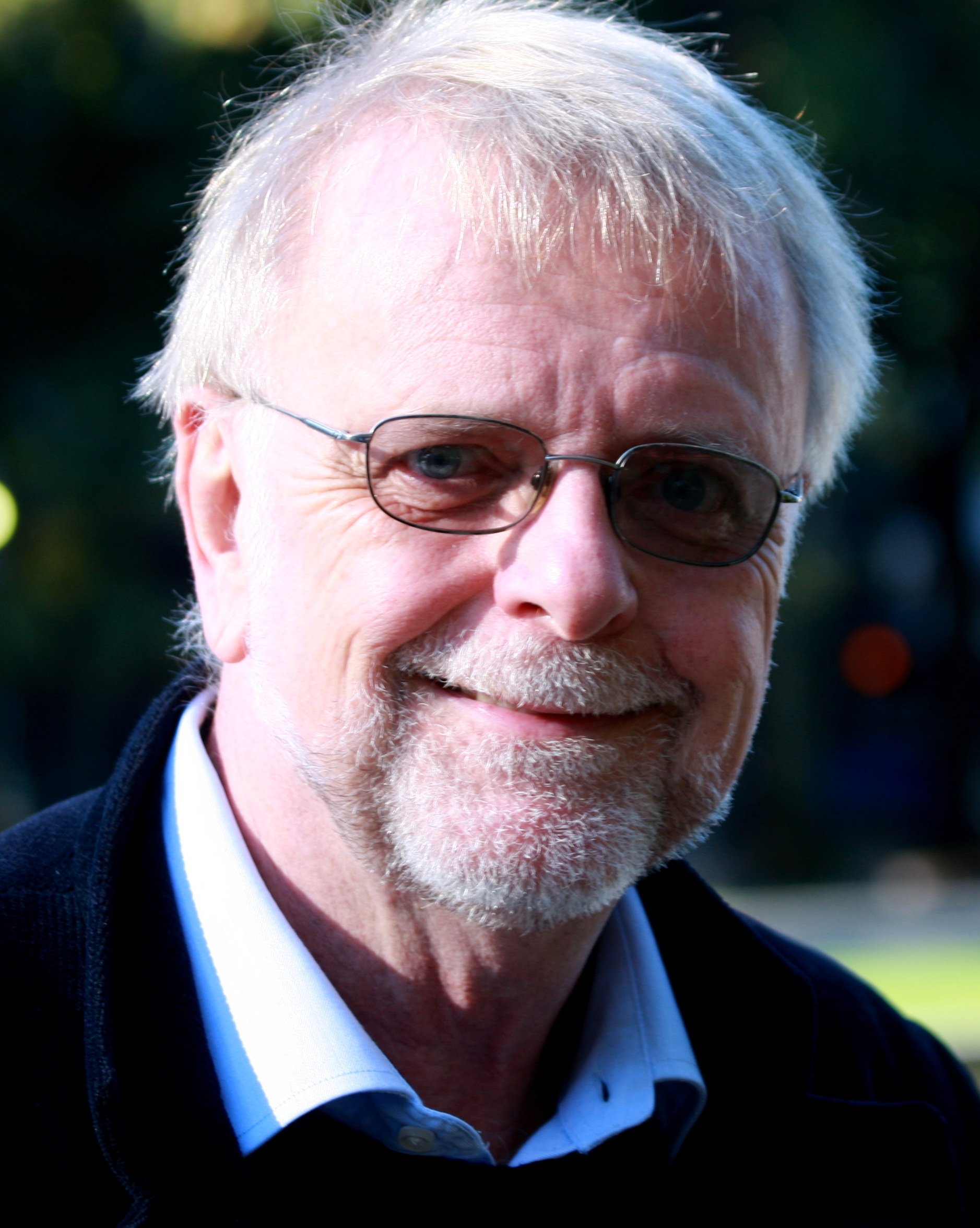
- Hagerup in 2010
- Born: 5 March 1946; Oslo, Norway
- Died: 20 December 2018 (aged 72); Oslo, Norway
- Occupation(s): Author, translator, screenwriter, actor, director
- Years active: 1969–2017
- Children: 2, including Hilde
- Mother: Inger Hagerup
- Relatives: Helge Hagerup (brother)

Klaus Hagerup (5 March 1946 – 20 December 2018) was a Norwegian author, translator, screenwriter, actor and director. He was also known for his role of Tom in the film The Chieftain (1984).

== Career ==
The youngest of two brothers, he debuted with the poem collection "Slik tenker jeg på dere" ("This is how I think about you") in 1969. During 1968–69 he worked at the Bergen theatre Den Nationale Scene and later at Nationaltheatret and Hålogaland Teater as an actor, instructor, director and writer. He has also acted in several movies, but is better known as a writer of plays for scene and radio theater. He also wrote many well-known books, mostly for teenagers, but also for older and younger readers. He is best known for his books about the insecure teenage boy Markus.

In 1988, he wrote a biography "Alt er så nær meg" ("Everything is so close to me") about his famous mother, Inger Hagerup. He won several literature awards for his books, including the Brage Prize in 1994. Sverre Kjelsberg has written music for many of his lyrics, amongst others "Ellinors vise" ("Ellinors song"). He also collaborated with people like Tande-P, Jostein Gaarder, and Trond Kirkvaag.

His brother, Helge Hagerup (deceased) was an author and artist, and his daughters, Hanne Hagerup and Hilde Hagerup, are also authors.

In 2017, Hagerup was diagnosed with colorectal cancer. He died from the disease on 20 December 2018 in Oslo at the age of 72.

== Bibliography ==
- Slik tenker jeg på dere, 1969 (poems)
- Alice i underverdenen /Kuler i solnedgangen, 1974 (two plays)
- Det e her æ høre tel/Ronnie, 1978 (two plays)
- I denne verden er alt mulig, 1978 (radio play/musical)
- I blådress og blålere, 1980 (play/musical)
- Roser er røde, 1981 (play)
- Gullivers siste reise, 1982 (play)
- Pelle og superstøvlene, 1983 (radioplay)
- Ninas hemmelige reise, 1984 (radioplay)
- Undrenes tid, 1984 (play)
- Desperadosklubben og den mystiske mistenkte, 1985 (video game)
- Dyreklubben møter Torden Olsen, 1986 (children's play)
- Heartbreak Hotel, 1987 (play)
- Alt er så nær meg. Om Inger Hagerup, 1988 (biography)
- Bill. mrk. "De glødende hjerters liga" (with Tande-P.), 1989 (teenage novel)
- Såpestykket (with Carsten Palmær), 1989 (play)
- Landet der tiden var borte, 1989 (teenage novel)
- Høyere enn himmelen, 1990 (teenage novel)
- God bedring (with Tande-P.), 1991 (humour book)
- Lisa og demonen i den gylne byen, 1991 (radio play)
- Kvarvingen (with Tande-P.), 1992 (play)
- I går var i dag i morgen, 1992 (teenage novel)
- De glødende hjerters liga (with Tande-P), 1993 (teenage novel)
- Bibbi Bokkens magiske bibliotek (with Jostein Gaarder), 1993 (children's novel)
- Blå fugler, 1993 (play)
- Kristin og Håkon, 1993 (children's novel)
- Markus og Diana og lyset fra Sirius, 1994 (teenage novel)
- Seniorhumoristen, 1994 (novel)
- Drømmen om Sherwoodskogen/Marie og spøkelset, 1996 (two radio plays for children)
- Drager skal fly, 1996 (children's novel )
- Bill. Mrk. "Egen utgang", 1997 (play)
- Markus og jentene, 1997 (teenage novel)
- Maratonherren, 1998 (novel)
- Markus og den store fotballkjærligheten, 1999 (teenage novel)
- Herremannen, 2000 (novel)
- Marie og julesnapperen, 2000 (teenage novel)
- Kaninene synger i mørket, 2001 (teenage novel)
- Markus og Sigmund, 2003 (teenage novel)
- Markus og karaokekongen, 2004 (teenage novel)
- Siste Akt (with Nils Nordberg), 2007 (crime novel)

== Filmography ==
- Rivalen (screenplay), 1970
- Helten på den grøne øya (actor), 1971
- Betrayal (actor), 1981
- I denne verden er alt mulig (screenplay), 1983
- Høvdingen (Chieftain) (actor), 1984
- Nikkerne (TV series) (screenplay, co-director), 1984
- Noe Helt Annet (Something Completely Different) (actor), 1985
- Plastposen (actor), 1986
- Måker (actor), 1991
- Høyere enn himmelen (Beyond the sky) (screenplay), 1993
- Markus og Diana (actor, assistant director, screenplay), 1996

Awards
| Preceded by Torill Eide | Recipient of the Brage Prize for children and youth 1994 | Succeeded by Liv Marie Austrem; Akin Duzakin |
