= Inger Hagerup =

Norwegian author, playwright and poet (1905–1985)

Inger Hagerup, twentieth century Norwegian poet

Inger Hagerup (née Halsør; 12 April 1905 in Bergen – 6 February 1985 in Fredrikstad) was a Norwegian writer, playwright and poet. She is considered one of the greatest Norwegian poets of the 20th century.

== Life and career ==
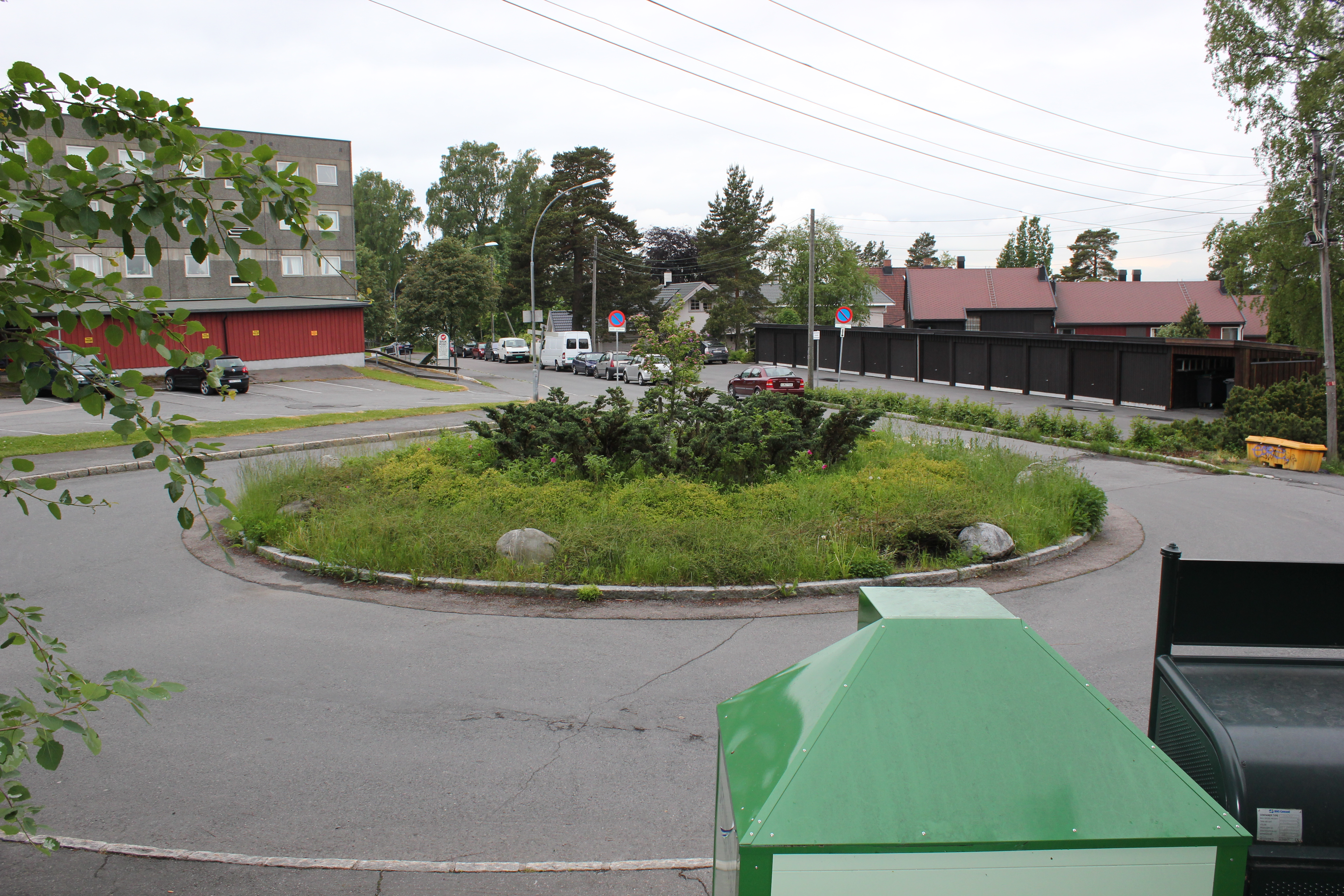
Inger Hagerups plass at Haugerud, Oslo, where she lived as an adult

Inger Johanne Halsør was born in Bergen, Norway. Her father died when she was five years old. For several years, her family moved around, until they settled in the Nordfjord district and later in Volda Municipality. In 1931, she married Anders Askevold Hagerup (1904–1979), who was a teacher, translator and children's book author. They settled at Haugerud, Oslo, and became the parents of two distinguished Norwegian authors, Klaus Hagerup and Helge Hagerup. Her son, Klaus Hagerup, wrote extensively about his mother in Alt er så nær meg: Om Inger Hagerup.

Inger Hagerup is mostly known for her lyric poetry, but has also been recognized for writing many important theatrical pieces. Hagerup published her first poetry collection, Jeg gikk meg vill i skogene, in 1939.

While studying in Trondheim she was also a member of the Communist organisation Mot Dag. Both Inger Hagerup and her husband Anders participated in resistance activities during the occupation of Norway by Nazi Germany and in 1943 they fled to Sweden. She was known for opposing the German occupation, writing many lyrics against what she saw as a brutal and careless enemy, such as in "Aust Vågøy". The latter was inspired by an incident that occurred in the Second World War. The Nazis retaliated against locals after a successful British raid-attack in March 1941 in the Lofoten Islands. Many Norwegians can recite from memory the first lines, De brente våre gårder. De drepte våre menn. La våre hjerter hamre det om og om igjen. ("They burned our houses. They killed our men. Let our hearts pound it, over and over again).

In 1944 she was awarded the Gyldendal's Endowment, the Sarpsborg Prize in 1955 and in 1962 Inger Hagerup was recognized with the Dobloug Prize. She died in Fredrikstad, Østfold on 6 February 1985.

Her poem "Två tungor" (Two tongues) has been sung by Fred Åkerström on his 1972 album of that name, and by Sofia Karlsson on her 2007 album Visor från vinden.

== Selected works ==
- Jeg gikk meg vill i skogene, 1939
- Flukten til Amerika, 1942
- Videre, Stockholm 1944, Oslo 1945
- Lykke , 1945
- Den syvende natt, 1947
- Sånn vil du ha meg. 30 utvalgte dikt om kjærlighet, 1949
- Så rart (children's poetry), 1950
- Mitt skip seiler, 1951
- Hilsen fra Katarina, 1953
- Drømmeboken, 1955
- Den tredje utvei (drama), 1956
- Strofe med vinden, 1958
- Lille Persille (children's poetry), 1961
- Fra hjertets krater, 1964
- Dikt i utvalg, 1965
- Det kommer en pike gående, 1965
- Hva skal du her nede?, 1966
- Trekkfuglene og skjæra, 1967
- Ut og søke tjeneste, 1968
- Østenfor kjærlighet, vestenfor drøm (short stories), edited by Karin Beate Vold, 1977
- Samlede dikt, 1985

== Other sources ==
- Hagerup, Klaus (1988) Alt er sa nær meg: Om Inger Hagerup (Oslo: Aschehoug) ISBN 978-82-03-15466-9
- Hagerup, Inger: Karin Beate Vold, and Jan Erik Vold (1990) Samlede Dikt (Oslo: Aschehoug) ISBN 978-82-03-08689-2
