= Wolfgang Hildesheimer =

German author

- Born: 9 December 1916; Hamburg, Germany
- Died: 21 August 1991 (aged 74)
- Resting place: Protestant cemetery in Poschiavo, Switzerland
- Occupations: Writer and painter
- Relatives: Azriel Hildesheimer (Great-grandfather)
- Writing career
- Notable works: Tynset, lyrical prose (1965); Mozart (1977)

Signature
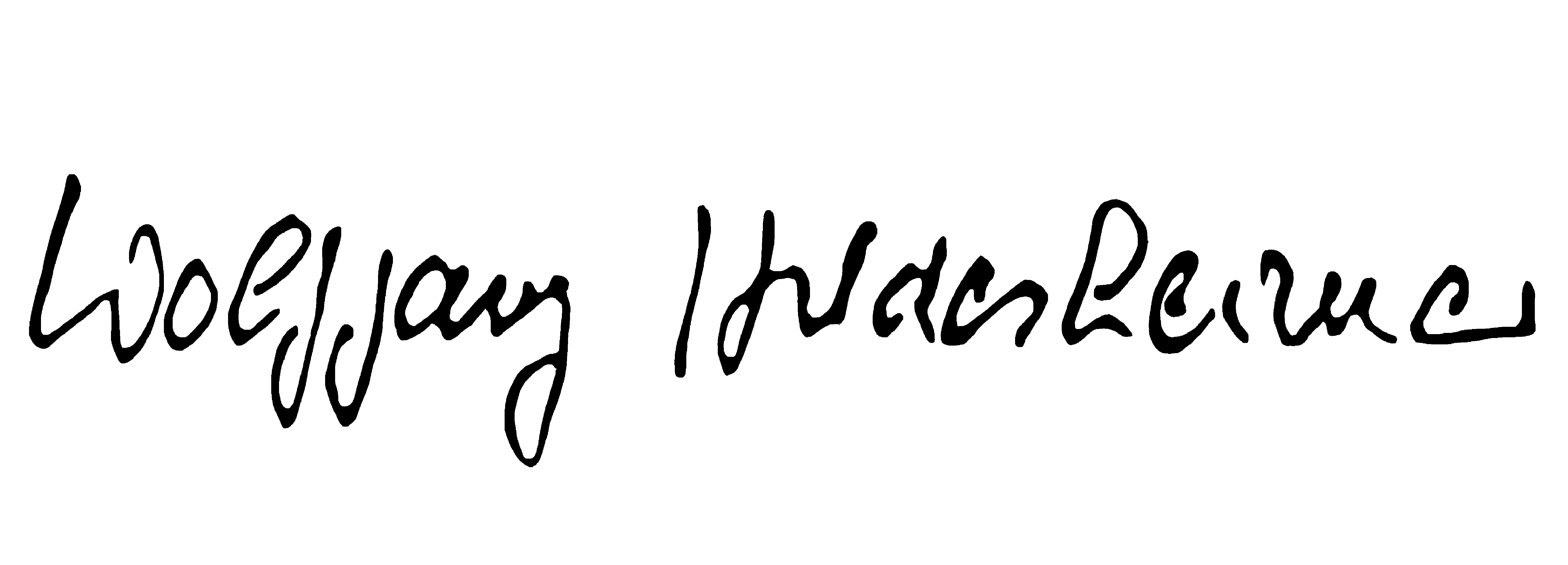

Wolfgang Hildesheimer (9 December 1916 – 21 August 1991) was a German author. He originally trained as an artist, before turning to writing.

== Biography ==
Hildesheimer was born of Jewish parents, chemist Arnold Hildesheimer (1885–1955) and Hanna Goldschmidt (1888–1962), in Hamburg. His great-grandfather was Azriel Hildesheimer, the moderniser of Orthodox Judaism in Germany. He was educated at the Humanistisches Gymnasium in Mannheim (Karl-Friedrich-Gymnasium) from 1926 to 1930. He then attended Odenwaldschule until 1933, when he left Germany. He was then educated at Frensham Heights School in Surrey, England. He studied carpentry in Mandatory Palestine, where his parents had emigrated. He studied painting and stage building in London.

In 1946 he worked as a translator and clerk at the Nuremberg trials. Afterward, he worked as a writer and was a member of Group 47. In 1980, he gave the inaugural address at the Salzburg Festival, "Was sagt Musik aus?" [What does music say?]. In addition to writing, Hildesheimer created collages which he collected in several volumes (the first Endlich allein, 1984), an activity he shared with other late-20th century writers Peter Weiss and Ror Wolf. The municipality of Poschiavo in Switzerland made Hildesheimer an honorary citizen in 1982; he died there in 1991.

== Works ==
- 1952 Lieblose Legenden, short stories
- 1953 Das Paradies der falschen Vögel
- 1954 An den Ufern der Plotinitza, radio play
- 1955 Der Drachenthron, comedy in three acts
- 1955 Das Opfer Helena, radio play
- 1954 Das Märchen von Prinzessin Turandot (The Fairy Tale of Princess Turandot), radio play
- 1958 Pastorale oder Die Zeit für Kakao, play
- 1960 Herrn Walsers Raben, radio play
- 1961 Die Verspätung, play
- 1962 Vergebliche Aufzeichnungen
- 1965 Tynset, a novel
- 1970 Mary Stuart, play
- 1971 Zeiten in Cornwall, travelogue
- 1973 Masante, a novel
- 1977 Mozart, a biography of Wolfgang Amadeus Mozart
- 1981 Marbot, a fictional biography of Sir Andrew Marbot
- 1983 Mitteilungen an Max (Über den Stand der Dinge und anderes)

== Awards ==
- Hörspielpreis der Kriegsblinden (a radio play prize for Princess Turandot) 1955
- Georg Büchner Prize 1966
- Order of Merit of the Federal Republic of Germany (Großes Verdienstkreuz) 1983
