= Inge Krokann =

Norwegian writer

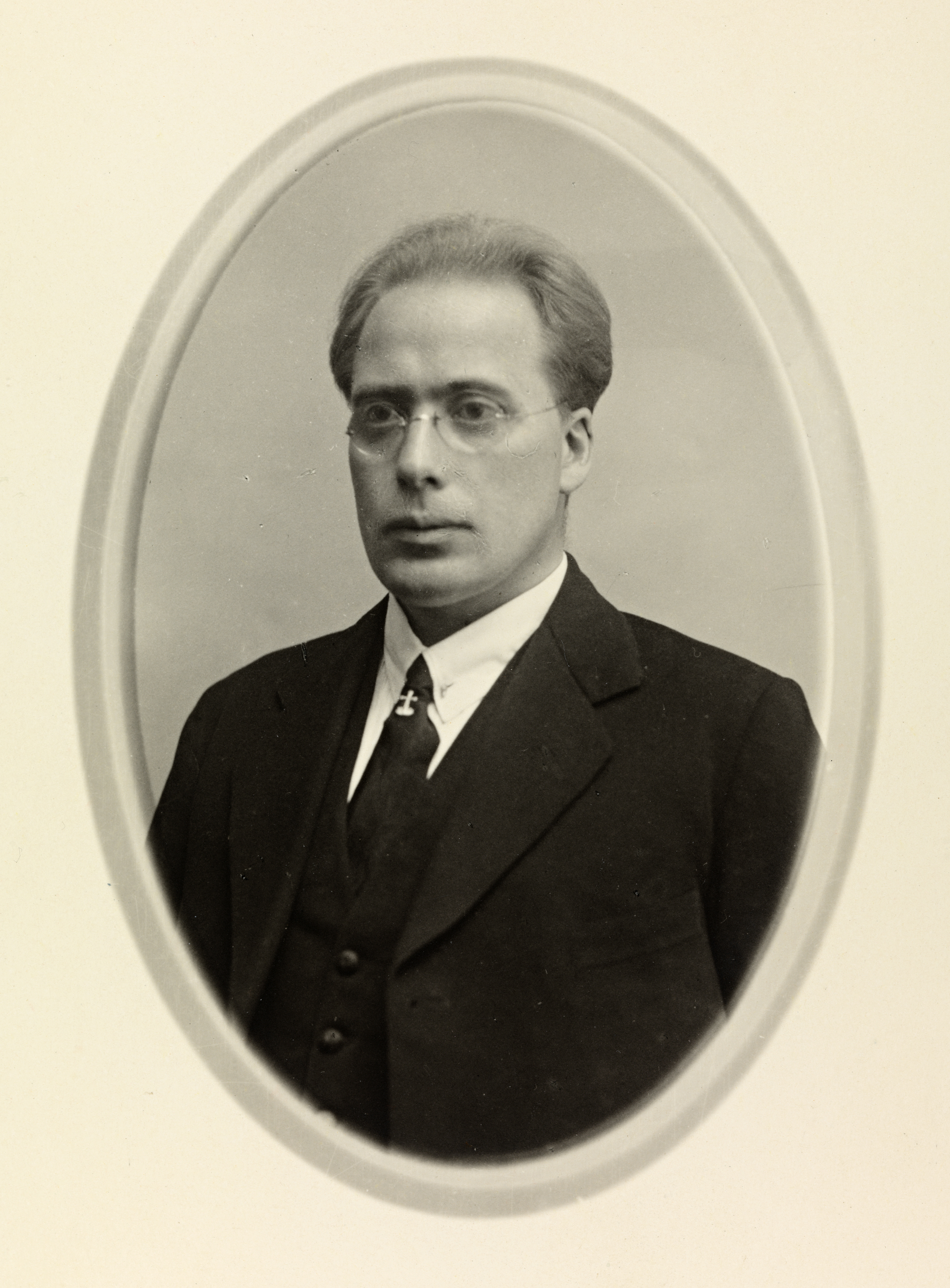
Inge Krokann in 1929

Inge Krokann (19 August 1893 – 27 September 1962) was a Norwegian writer. His most famous work is I Dovre Sno (1929), an epic story of the Loe family during the Middle Ages. Because his writing was full of local expressions and is so strongly tied to the use of the Oppdal dialect and idiosyncratic Nynorsk, his works are largely inaccessible and difficult to translate.

== Biography ==
Ingebrikt Krokann was born at Oppdal Municipality in Sør-Trøndelag, Norway. He was the son of Trond Jonsson Krokann (1858–1936) and Dørdi Olsdatter Lo (1859–1933). In 1915 he took his final exam at Volda lærarskule. He worked as a teacher first at the children's school in Rennebu Municipality. During the winter of 1917–18, he got a leave to go to Askov Folk High School in Denmark, and then he took a college course in Volda Municipality. From 1920 to 1923 he taught at Skogn Folkhøgskule. He developed tuberculosis and never fully recovered. He taught at the Nordic folk college in Fredriksberg in Denmark during 1937–1938. Krokann received several travel grants and traveled to many countries in Europe and Africa.

He was married in 1921 with Gunvor Widebæk Lund (1899–1991). He died at Gausdal Municipality in Oppland county, Norway.

His work was characterized by:

- Vivid descriptions of the relationships between man and nature in the harsh environment around his birthplace of Oppdal Municipality;
- Effective and innovative use of the Oppdal dialect and nynorsk in his writing;
- A strong sense of history in his writing, tying together the pagan and Christian eras in Norwegian history.

== Bibliography ==
- I Dovre-sno, Gyldendal, 1929.
- Gjenom fonna, 2 volumes, Gyldendal, 1931.
- Olav Aukrust, 1933.
- På linfeksing, Gyldendal, 1934.
- Blodrøter, Gyldendal, 1936.
- Då bøndene reiste seg, Gyldendal, 1937.
- Det store hamskiftet i bondesamfunnet, Samlaget, 1942.
- Under himmelteiknet, Gyldendal, 1944.
- Dikt, Gyldendal, 1947.
- Ut av skuggen, Gyldendal, 1949.
- Gravlagt av lynet, Gyldendal, 1952.
- Oppdal, bygda mi, 1952.

== Awards ==
- Gyldendal's Endowment for 1942
- Melsom-prisen 1942 (together with Ragnvald Vaage)
- Dobloug Prize 1954
