= Bastian Prize =

Norwegian literary award

The Bastian Prize (Norwegian: Bastianprisen) is a prize awarded annually by the Norwegian Association of Literary Translators.

The prize, established in 1951, is given for translating a published work into Norwegian language. The award is a statue made by Ørnulf Bast, and usually a monetary grant as well.

== List of winners ==
These are the winners of the Bastian Prize:

=== Regular class ===
- 1951 : Helge Simonsen
- 1952 : Eli Krog
- 1953 : Åke Fen
- 1954 : Nils Lie
- 1955 : Leo Strøm
- 1956 : Elsa Uhlen
- 1957 : Peter Magnus
- 1958 : André Bjerke
- 1959 : Odd Bang-Hansen
- 1960 : Hartvig Kiran
- 1961 : Halldis Moren Vesaas
- 1962 : Trygve Greiff
- 1963 : Carl Hambro
- 1964 : Brikt Jensen
- 1965 : Sigmund Skard
- 1966 : Hans Braarvig
- 1967 : Åse-Marie Nesse
- 1968 : Albert Lange Fliflet
- 1969 : Milada Blekastad
- 1970 : Lotte Holmboe
- 1971 : Axel Amlie
- 1972 : Ivar Eskeland
- 1973 : Trond Winje
- 1974 : Tom Rønnow
- 1975 : Kjell Risvik
- 1976 : Carl Fredrik Engelstad
- 1977 : Erik Gunnes
- 1978 : Geir Kjetsaa
- 1979 : Arne Dørumsgaard
- 1980 : Carsten Middelthon
- 1981 : Anne-Lisa Amadou
- 1982 : Hans Aaraas
- 1983 : Ole Michael Selberg
- 1984 : Knut Ødegård
- 1985 : Herbert Svenkerud
- 1986 : Ivar Orgland
- 1987 : Anne Elligers
- 1988 : Camilla Wulfsberg
- 1989 : Turid Farbregd
- 1990 : Inger Gjelsvik
- 1991 : Mona Lange
- 1992 : Aud Greiff
- 1993 : Karin Gundersen
- 1994 : Merete Alfsen
- 1995 : Nils Ivar Agøy
- 1996 : Kåre Langvik-Johannessen
- 1997 : Johannes Gjerdåker
- 1998 : Solveig Schult Ulriksen
- 1999 : Christian Rugstad
- 2000 : Erik Ringen
- 2001 : Kari Kemény
- 2002 : Birger Huse
- 2003 : Arne Worren
- 2004 : Dag Heyerdahl Larsen
- 2005 : Bård Kranstad
- 2006 : Olav Angell
- 2007 : Grete Kleppen
- 2008 : Per Qvale
- 2009 : Tom Lotherington
- 2010 : Isak Rogde
- 2011 : Knut Ofstad
- 2012 : Ika Kaminka
- 2013 : Tommy Watz
- 2014 : Eve-Marie Lund
- 2015 : Oskar Vistdal
- 2016 : Kristina Solum
- 2017 : Bjørn Herrman
- 2018 : Mikael Holmberg
- 2019 : Sverre Dahl
- 2020 : Gøril Eldøen
- 2021 : Geir Pollen
- 2022 : Kirstin Vogt
- 2023 : Magne Tørring
- 2024 : Marit Bjerkeng
- 2025 : Ute Neumann

=== Children's literature ===
- 1984 : Zinken Hopp, Johannes Farestveit
- 1985 : Siri Ness
- 1986 : Tor Edvin Dahl
- 1987 : Kari Skjønsberg
- 1988 : Tormod Haugen
- 1989 : Isak Rogde
- 1990 : Tove Gravem Smedstad
- 1991 : Mette Newth
- 1992 : Johan Fredrik Grøgaard
- 1993 : Jo Giæver Tenfjord
- 1994 : Lars Vikør
- 1995 : Halldis Moren Vesaas
- 1996 : none
- 1997 : Erik J. Krogstad
- 1998 : Jo Ørjasæter
- 1999 : Henning Hagerup
- 2000 : Torstein Bugge Høverstad
- 2001 : Gunnel Malmstrøm
- 2002 : Øystein Rosse
- 2003 : Tove Bakke
- 2004 : Fartein Døvle Jonassen
- 2005 : Guri Vesaas
- 2006 : Merete Alfsen
- 2007 : none
- 2008 : Ragnar Hovland
- 2009 : Kyrre Haugen Bakke
- 2010 : none
- 2011 : Carina Westberg
- 2012 : none
- 2013 : Bjørn Herrman
- 2014 : Eivind Lilleskjæret
- 2015 : Torleif Sjøgren-Erichsen
- 2016 : Stian Omland
- 2017 : Tiril Broch Aakre
- 2018 : Nina Aspen
- 2019 : Kirsti Vogt
- 2020 : Kari Bolstad
- 2021 : Vibeke Saugestad
- 2022 : Hilde Stubhaug
- 2023 : Sverre Knudsen
- 2024 : Agnes Banach
- 2025 : Stéphanie Lutz de Miranda
