= Voss Folk High School =

Folk school in Voss, Norway

Coordinates: 59.3888°N 9.1643°E

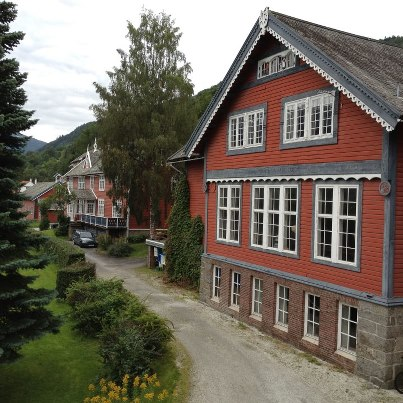
Voss Folk High School

Voss Folk High School (Norwegian: Voss Folkehøgskule) is a private folk school in Voss Municipality, Norway.

The school is located at Seim in the western part of Vossavangen in Voss Municipality in Vestland county. It was established in 1895 by educators Olaus Alvestad (1866–1903) and Lars Eskeland (1867–1942). The school follows the ideology inspired by clergyman and teacher N. F. S. Grundtvig (1783–1872) and his principals of education. It is today owned by an independent foundation.
