= Severin Eskeland =

Norwegian politician (1880–1964)

- Born: 31 March 1880; Stord Municipality, Norway
- Died: 19 July 1964 (aged 84); Stord Municipality, Norway
- Occupations: educator, biographer and politician

Severin Eskeland (31 March 1880 – 18 July 1964) was a Norwegian educator, biographer and elected official.

== Biography ==
Eskeland was born at Stord Municipality in Hordaland county, Norway. He was the son of Øystein Larsson Eskeland (1840–1933) and Mari Larsdotter Vatna (1844–1932). He was the brother of Lars Eskeland.

He received a degree from Hans Nielsen Hauges Minde in Kristiania (now Oslo) during 1903. From 1903 to 1905, he studied at the University of Kristiania (now University of Oslo), but did not take the final exam. He also conducted study trips to Germany, Switzerland and France.

From 1903 to 1950 he was employed in the field of education. He worked at schools in Oslo, Kristiansand, Notodden and Levanger until 1917. He was Rector at the Stord Teachers College (Stord Lærarhøgskule) from 1917 to 1950. He wrote textbooks on history, physics and Old Norse. Additionally he wrote biographies on Rasmus Løland, Thomas von Westen, Vladimir Lenin and Thomas More. He also served as mayor of Stord Municipality from 1935 to 1942.

In 1908, he married Olga Dorothea Olsen (1886–1975) and was the father of Ivar Eskeland.

== Selected works ==
- Soga um Eirik Raude: gamalnorsk grunntekst og nynorsk umsetjing, 1907
- Lærebok i gamalnorsk (with Knut Liestøl), 1910
- for ungdomsskulen (with Lars Eskeland), 1912
- Soga um millomalderen og den nye tidi, 1926
- Kvar skal teiknet stå?, 1943
- Kongens tenar – men Guds fyrst. Soga um Thomas More, 1944
