= Hans Aaraas =

Norwegian literary researcher

- Born: 1919; Skien.
- Died: 1998 (aged 78–79)
- Occupations: Lecturer in Norwegian at Sorbonne, University of Oslo And professor of French literature at the University of Bergen.
- Years active: 1956-1985.
- Awards: Bastian Prize for translation in 1982.

Hans Aaraas (1919–1998) was a Norwegian literary researcher.

He was born in Skien. He took the mag.art. degree in 1947 and the dr.philos. degree in 1960 with a thesis on Georges Bernanos. He was a lecturer in Norwegian at Sorbonne from 1949 to 1953, lecturer at the University of Oslo from 1956 to 1961 and professor of French literature at the University of Bergen from 1961 to 1986. He was visiting faculty at the University of Washington from 1984 to 1985. He was awarded the Bastian Prize for translation in 1982.

Awards
Preceded by Anne-Lisa Amadou	Recipient of the Bastian Prize; 1982	Succeeded by Ole Michael Selberg
