= Olav Aaraas =

Norwegian historian and museum director

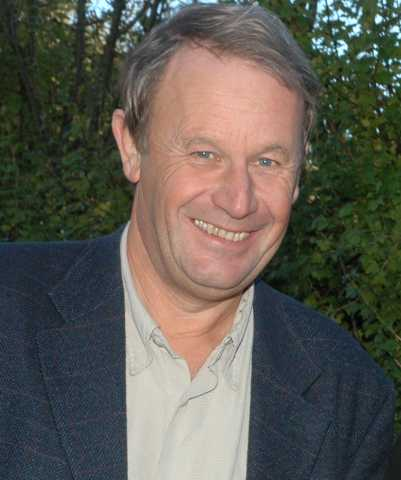
- Born: 10 July 1950 (age 75); Fredrikstad, Norway
- Occupations: Historian, museum director
- Years active: 1982–present
- Known for: Director of Norwegian Museum of Cultural History
- Awards: Royal Norwegian Order of St. Olav (2010)

Olav Aaraas (born 10 July 1950) is a Norwegian historian and museum director.

He was born in Fredrikstad. From 1982 to 1993 he was the director of Sogn Folk Museum, from 1993 to 2010 he was the director of Maihaugen and from 2001 he has been the director of the Norwegian Museum of Cultural History. In 2010 he was decorated with the Royal Norwegian Order of St. Olav.
