= Lars Eskeland =

Norwegian educator and writer

Lars Eskeland (6 March 1867 – 30 September 1942) was a Norwegian educator and writer, and proponent for Nynorsk.

== Personal life ==
Eskeland was born at Stordøen Municipality (later spelled Stord) as the son of farmers Øystein Larsson Eskeland and Mari Larsdotter Vatna, and was a brother of Severin Eskeland. He married Marta Nerhus in 1893. He was uncle of Ivar Eskeland.

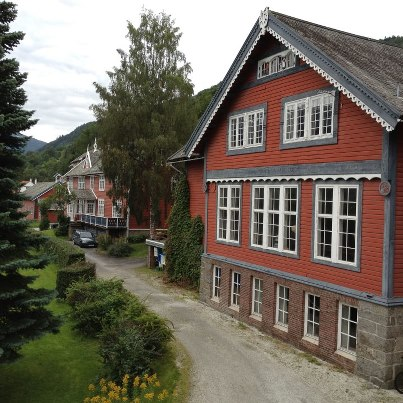
From Voss Folk High School.

== Career ==
Eskeland co-founded the Voss Folk High School at Vossavangen in 1895, and served as long-term principal and teacher at this school. Among his students were several later well known writers, including Tarjei Vesaas, Sjur Bygd, Tore Ørjasæter, Olav Sletto and Ragnvald Vaage. He wrote a total of about sixty books or other publications. He was decorated Knight of the Order of St. Olav in 1935. In 1949 a statue of Eskeland was unveiled in Voss.
