= Isak Rogde =

Norwegian translator (1947–2010)

Isak Rogde (3 February 1947 – 3 January 2010) was a Norwegian translator.

He was born on the island of Senja and he enrolled in the University of Oslo in 1968, and graduated with the cand.mag. degree in 1972. He worked as a teacher, and also lectured in the Norwegian language at the University of Moscow. He translated about 150 books to Norwegian, especially from Russian. For this he was awarded the Bastian Prize in 1989.
