= Carsten Middelthon =

Norwegian journalist and translator

Carsten Middelthon (10 December 1916 – 9 November 2005) was a Norwegian journalist and translator.

He was born in Kristiania. After finishing his secondary education in 1936, he graduated from the University of Oslo with the cand.jur. degree in 1941 and practised law for three years. After one year in the insurance business he published the weekly newspaper Kritikken in 1945–46.

Middelthon was hired as a journalist in Dagbladet in 1946. In 1960 he moved to Arbeiderbladet as Italy-based correspondent. Returning home in 1969, he left Arbeiderbladet for Norwegian People's Aid in 1975, but continued as a columnist until 1983. He was also a reviewer for Arbeidernes Pressekontor, syndicating articles within the Norwegian Labour press, between 1979 and 1988.

He was awarded the Bastian Prize in 1980 for translating volume one of Peter Weiss' The Aesthetics of Resistance, and also the Riksmål Society Translators' Prize in 1985 for translating Umberto Eco's The Name of the Rose. He also published the journalistic account Terror i Italia in 1975.

His mother was a granddaughter of Joseph Frantz Oscar Wergeland. Carsten Middelthon died in 2005.
