= Norwegian Association of Literary Translators =

Norwegian Association of Literary Translators (Norwegian: Norsk Oversetterforening) is an association for Norwegian literary translators, founded in 1948. The association has awarded the annual Bastian Prize from 1951, for best literary translation into the Norwegian language. The prize is a statue made by the sculptor Ørnulf Bast.

It is a member of CEATL.
