= 1977 in poetry =

Nationality words link to articles with information on the nation's poetry or literature (for instance, Irish or France).

== Events ==
- January – James Dickey, composes a poem he reads at new United States President Jimmy Carter’s inaugural gala (although not at the inauguration itself).
- July 11 – The English magazine Gay News is found guilty of blasphemous libel for publishing a homoerotic poem The Love That Dares to Speak Its Name by James Kirkup in a case (Whitehouse v. Lemon) brought by Mary Whitehouse's National Viewers and Listeners Association at the Old Bailey in London.
- Poet Sarah Kirsch leaves her native East Germany for the West.
- In Israeli the literary journal Keshet goes defunct, while Itton and Proza are founded.

== Works published in English ==
Listed by nation where the work was first published and again by the poet's native land, if different; substantially revised works listed separately:

=== Australia ===
- Robert Adamson:
  - Cross The Border
  - Selected Poems
- Jennifer Maiden, Mortal Details, Rigmarole
- Les Murray, Ethnic Radio, Angus & Robertson
- John Tranter, Crying in Early Infancy: 100 Sonnets, Makar Press

=== Canada ===
- Earle Birney:
  - The Damnation of Vancouver. Toronto: McClelland & Stewart. A satire on the modern city.
  - Ghost in the Wheels: selected poems. Toronto: McClelland and Stewart.
- Roo Borson, Landfall, ISBN 0-920110-32-0 American-Canadian
- Leonard Cohen, Death of a Ladies' Man
- Isabella Valancy Crawford, Hugh and Ion, Glenn Clever ed. (Ottawa: Borealis). ISBN 978-0-919594-77-7
- Irving Layton, The Poems of Irving Layton. Eli Mandel ed. Toronto: McClelland and Stewart. Also published, with an introduction by Hugh Kenner, as The Selected Poems of Irving Layton. New York: New Directions, 1977. ISBN 0-8112-0642-4
- Irving Layton, The Covenant. Toronto: McClelland and Stewart.
- Dorothy Livesay, Right Hand Left Hand. Erin, ON: Porcepic.
- Pat Lowther, A Stone Diary
- Miriam Mandel, Station 14. Edmonton: NeWest Press. ISBN 0-920316-08-5 ISBN 978-0920316085
- Charles Sangster, The Angel Guest and Other Poems and Lyrics, edited by Frank M. Tierney (Tecumseh)
- F. R. Scott, Poems of French Canada. Translated by F. R. Scott. Burnaby, B.C.: Blackfish Press.
- Raymond Souster, Extra Innings. Ottawa. Oberon Press.
- George Woodcock, Anima, or, Swann Grown Old. A Cycle of Poems by George Woodcock, Windsor, Ontario: Black Moss Press, Canada

=== India, in English ===
- R. Parthasarathy, Rough Passage, Delhi: Oxford University Press
- Meena Alexander, I Root My Name, Calcutta: Writers Workshop, India.

=== Ireland ===
- Samuel Beckett, Collected Poems in English and French, Irish native living in France and published in the United Kingdom
- Eiléan Ní Chuilleanáin: The Second Voyage, including "Deaths and Engines", Oldcastle: The Gallery Press
- Harry Clifton, The Walls of Carthage Oldcastle: The Gallery Press, ISBN 978-0-902996-51-9
- Paul Muldoon, Mules, Northern Ireland poet published in the United Kingdom
- Frank Ormsby, A Store of Candles, including "Passing the Crematorium", Oldcastle: Gallery Press
- Tom Paulin, A State of Justice, Northern Ireland poet published in the United Kingdom

=== New Zealand ===
- Bill Manhire, How to Take Off Your Clothes at the Picnic
- Lauris Edmond, The Pear Tree: Poems
- R. Ensing, editor, Private Gardens, anthology of New Zealand women poets
- Kendrick Smithyman, Dwarf with a Billiard Cue, Auckland: Auckland University Press and Oxford University Press
- Ian Wedde, Spells for Coming Out, New Zealand

=== South Africa ===
- Mafika Gwala, Jol'iinkomo

=== United Kingdom ===
- Samuel Beckett, Collected Poems in English and French, Irish native living in France and published in the United Kingdom
- Kamau Brathwaite, Mother Poem
- Joseph Brodsky: Poems and Translations, Keele: University of Keele Russian-American (but published in the United Kingdom; see United States section for a book published there)
- Donald Davies, To Scorch or Freeze
- Carol Ann Duffy and Adrian Henri, Beauty and the Beast
- Elaine Feinstein:
  - Some Unease and Angels, Hutchinson
  - Selected Poems, University Center, Michigan, Green River Press
- W. S. Graham, Implements in their Places
- Michael Hamburger, Real Estate
- Adrian Henri, City Hedges
- Ted Hughes, Gaudete, derived from an abandoned film scenario, the book has elements of a poetic novel, narrative poem and verse play
- Elizabeth Jennings, Consequently I Rejoice
- Norman MacCaig, Tree of Strings
- Sorley MacLean, pen name of Somhairle MacGill-Eain, Spring Tide and Neap Tide [Reothairt is Contraigh], in Gaelic and English
- Paul Muldoon, Mules, Northern Ireland poet published in the United Kingdom
- Tom Paulin, A State of Justice, Northern Ireland poet published in the United Kingdom
- Kathleen Raine, The Oval Portrait, and Other Poems
- Peter Scupham, The Hinterland
- R. S. Thomas, The Way of It
- Anthony Thwaite, A Portion for Foxes

=== United States ===
- A. R. Ammons:
  - Highgate Road
  - The Selected Poems: 1951-1977
  - The Snow Poems
- John Ashbery, Houseboat Days
- Ted Berrigan:
  - Clear The Range
  - Nothing For You
- John Berryman, Henry's Fate and Other Poems, 1967-1972, with 45 previously unpublished "Dream Songs" (posthumous)
- Joseph Payne Brennan, The Riddle (Fantome Press)
- Frank Bidart, The Book of the Body
- Elizabeth Bishop, Geography III, which includes "In the Waiting Room," "The Moose," and the villanelle, "One Art"
- Joseph Brodsky: A Part of Speech Russian-American (see United Kingdom section for a book published there)
- Robert Bly, This Body is Made of Camphor and Gopherwood
- Billy Collins, Pokerface
- Frank Belknap Long, In Mayan Splendor
- Michael S. Harper, Images of Kin (1977), won the Melville-Cane Award from the Poetry Society of America; nominated for the National Book Award
- Robert Lowell, Day by Day
- W. S. Merwin:
  - The Compass Flower, New York: Atheneum
  - Translator, Vertical Poetry, poems by Roberto Juarroz; San Francisco: Kayak (reprinted in 1988; San Francisco: North Point Press)
- W. S. Merwin and J. Moussaieff Mason, translators, Sanskrit Love Poetry, New York: Columbia University Press (published in 1981 as Peacock's Egg: Love Poems from Ancient India, San Francisco: North Point Press)
- Michael Palmer, Without Music (Black Sparrow Press)
- Carl Rakosi, My Experience in Parnassus
- Charles Reznikoff, Poems 1937-1975 (published posthumously)
- Aleksandr Solzhenitsyn, Prussian Nights, translated into English from the original Russian by Robert Conquest; first written in 1951; first published in 1974
- Gary Soto, The Elements of San Joaquin

== Works published in other languages ==
Listed by language and often by nation where the work was first published and again by the poet's native land, if different; substantially revised works listed separately:

=== Denmark ===
- Vita Andersen, Tryghedsnarkomaner
- Jørgen Gustava Brandt, Ophold
- Klaus Høeck:
  - Projekt Perseus, publisher: Gyldendal
  - Ulrike Marie Meinhof, publisher: Gyldendal
- Vagn Lundbye, Digte 1977
- Jess Ornsbo, Digte uden arbejde
- Charlotte Strandgaard, Naesten kun om kaerlighed

=== French language ===
==== Canada, in French ====
- Denise Boucher and Madeleine Gagnon, Retailles
- Claude Gavreau, Ouvres créatrices complètes (posthumous)
- Michel Leclerc, La Traversée du réel
- Pierre Nepveu, Épisodes, Montréal: l'Hexagone

==== France ====
- Samuel Beckett, Collected Poems in English and French, Irish native living in France and published in the United Kingdom
- Yves Bonnefoy, Rue Traversière
- André du Bouchet, Air (1950–1953)
- Alain Delahaye, L'etre perdu
- Philippe Denis, Malgré la bouche
- Roger Giroux, published posthumously (died 1973):
  - S
  - L'arbre le Temps suivi le Lieu-Je et de Lettre
- Eugene Guilleveic, Du domaine
- Emmanuel Hocquard, Album d'images de la Villa Harris
- Georges Perec, Alphabets
- Jacques Roubaud, Autobiographie chapitre dix
- Alain Veinstein, Recherche des dispositions anciennes

=== German language ===
==== East Germany ====
- Sarah Kirsch, Rückenwind, love poems
- Paul Günter Krohn, Alle meine Namen

==== West Germany ====
- Herbert Asmodi, Jokers Farewell
- Gotthard de Beauclair, Zeit, Überzeit
- Rolf Haufs, Die Geschwindigkeit eines einzigen Tages
- Karl Krowlow, Der Einfachheit halber
- Norbert Mecklenburg, Naturlyrik und Gesellschaft Stuttgart: Klett-Cotta (scholarship)

=== Hebrew ===
- Nathan Alterman, a posthumous book of poems
- O. Bernstein, a book of poems
- Simon Halkin, a book of the collected poems and works
- Hurvitz, a book of poems
- Shimshon Meltzer, a book of the collected poems and works
- Gabriel Preil, a book of poems
- Dalia Ravikovitch, a book of poems
- Yonatan Ratosh, a book of poems
- Shin Shalom, a book of poems
- Y. Wallach, a book of collected poems
- Meir Wieseltier, a book of poems
- Avot Yeshurun, a book of poems
- Zussman, a posthumous book of poems

=== India ===
In each section, listed in alphabetical order by first name:

==== Malayalam ====
- Sugathakumari, Raathrimazha (Night Rain)

==== Oriya ====
- Mohan Upendra Thakur, Baji Uthal Murali
- Rajendra Kishore Panda:
  - Satadru Anek, Cuttack: Agradoot
  - Ghunakshara, Cuttack: Cuttack Students' Store

==== Sindhi ====
- Hari Daryani, Pala Pala Jo Parlau
- Harumal Isardas Sadarangani, Cikha
- Parsram Rohra, O Nava Halaina Vara

==== Urdu ====
- Mehr Lal Soni Zia Fatehabadi Dhoop Aur Chandni (The Sunlight and the Moonlight) - Collection of poems published by Radha Krishan Sehgal, Bazm-e-Seemab, J 5/21, Rajouri Garden, New Delhi in 1977.

==== Other languages in India ====
- K. Satchidanandan, Kavita, ("Poetry"); Malayalam-language
- Nilmani Phookan; Assamese-language:
  - Golapi Jamur Lagna, Guwahati, Assam: Bani Prakash
  - Editor, Kuri Satikar Asomiya Kavita, an anthology of modern Assamese poetry; Guwahati, Assam: Asom Prakashan Parishad
- Siddayya Puranika, Vacanodyana, modern vachana poetry, Kannada-language

=== Italy ===
- Bartolo Cattafi, Marzo e le sue idi
- Giovanni Guidici, Il male de creditori
- Tommaso Landolfi, Il tradimento
- Eugenio Montale, Tutte le poesie, publisher: Mondadori (enlarged edition published posthumously in 1984)
- Maria Luisa Spaziani, Transito con catene

=== Norway ===
- Hans Børli, Vinden ser aldri pa veviserne
- Jan Magnus Bruheim, Lyrespelaren
- Gunvor Hofmo, Hva fanger natten
- Peter R. Holm, I disse bilder
- Stein Mehren, Det trettende stjernebilde
- Sigmund Skard, Ord mot mørkret
- Helge Vatsend, Livets bok

=== Portuguese language ===
==== Portugal ====
- Ruy de Moura Belo, Despeço-me da terra da alegria ("I Bid Farewell to the Land of Happiness")
- Herberto Helder, Cobra
- António Ramos Rosa, Boca Incompleta
- Sophia Andresen, O Nome das Coisas
- Fiama Brandão, Homenagem à Literatura
- Liberto Cruz, Distància
- Vitorino Nemésio, Sapateia Açoriana

==== Brazil ====
- Carlos Nejar, Árvore do mundo
- Décio Pignatari
  - Poesia / Pois é / Poesia (poems)
  - Comunicacao poética (critical theory about poetry)
- Murilo Mendes, a posthumous collection of poems edited by João Cabral de Melo Neto, with a study by José Guilherme Merquior

=== Russia ===
- Arkadi Kuleshov, a book of poems
- Bella Akhmadulina:
  - Candle
  - Dreams of Georgia
- Alexander Mezhirov, Очертания вещей ("Outline of things"), Russia, Soviet Union
- Valentin Sorokin, a book of poems
- Stepan Shchipachev, a book of poems
- Aleksandr Solzhenitsyn, Prussian Nights, narrative poem, much of it composed in his head when he was in concentration camps
- Yevgeny Yevtushenko, a book of poems
- "[L]esser-known poets who attracted attention":
  - Konstantin Vanshenkin
  - Anatoly Zhigulin
  - Rimma Kazakova
  - Viktor Bokov
  - Maya Borisova
  - Stanslav Zolotsev

=== Spanish language ===
==== Spain ====
- Francisco Brines, Insistencia en Luzbel
- Matilde Camus, Cancionero de Liébana ("Collection of verse of Liebana")
- José María Valverde, Ser de palabra

==== Latin America ====
- Mario Benedetti, La casa y el ladrillo ("The House and the Brick"), Uruguay
- Antonio Cisneros, el libro de dios y de los húngaros (Peru)
- Jaime Sabines, Nuevo recuento de poemas (Mexico)
- Efraín Huerta, Circuito interior (Mexico)
- David Huerta, Cuadernos de noviembre (Mexico)

=== Yiddish ===
- Dovid Hofshteyn, a two-volume selection of poems
- Josl Lerner, Till Dawn Breaks, partly written in a German-Romanian death camp during World War II
- Chaim Maltinsky, My Mother's Resemblance
- Hirsch Osherovich, Song in a Labyrinth
- Shloyme Roitman, My Israel Shofar
- Ephraim Roitman, The Earth Sings
- Motl Saktzier, With a Burned Pencil, about his experiences in Soviet gulags
- M. M. Shafir, Words of Endearment
- Avrom Sutzkever, Poems from My Diary
- Rajzel Żychlińsky, The Sun of November

=== Other languages ===
- Stanisław Barańczak, Ja wiem, ze to niesluszne ("I Know It's Not Right"), Paris: Instytut Literacki; Polish
- Anne-Marie Berglund, Luftberusningen, Sweden
- Chen Yi, Selected Poems; China
- Odysseus Elytis, Signalbook (Σηματολόγιον); Greece
- Ndoc Gjetja, Qëndresa ("Center"); Albania
- Gozo Yoshimasu, river, Written in Cursive Characters; Japan
- Lars Gustafsson, Sonetter; Sweden
- Per E. Rundquist, Men störst av allt är kärleken till vem; (Sweden
- Piotr Sommer, W krześle; Poland
- Marlene van Niekerk, Sprokkelster; South Africa
- Wen Wu-pin, Battle Songs of Tachai; China
- Yasuo Irisawa, Moon and Other Poems; Japan

== Awards and honors ==
- Nobel Prize in Literature: Vicente Aleixandre (Spain)

=== Australia ===
- Anne Elder Award: Graeme Curtis, At Last No Reply and Laurie Duggan, East: Poems 1970-74
- Grace Leven Prize for Poetry: Robert Adamson, Selected Poems

=== Canada ===
- 1977 Governor General's Awards

=== United Kingdom ===
- Eric Gregory Award: Tony Flynn, Michael Vince, David Cooke, Douglas Marshall, Melissa Murray
- Queen's Gold Medal for Poetry: Norman Nicholson

=== United States ===
- AML Award for Poetry to Linda Sillitoe for "The Old Philosopher, Letter to a Four-Year-Old Daughter" and Arthur Henry King for "The Field Behind Holly House"
- Bollingen Prize: David Ignatow
- National Book Award for Poetry: Richard Eberhart, Collected Poems, 1930-1976
- Pulitzer Prize for Poetry: James Merrill, Divine Comedies
- Walt Whitman Award: Lauren Shakely, Guilty Bystander
- Fellowship of the Academy of American Poets: Louis Coxe

== Births ==
- April 18 — Ilya Kaminsky, Soviet-born Russian- and English-language poet
- September 25 — Sole, American hip hop artist
- Jenni Fagan, Scottish novelist and poet

== Deaths ==
Birth years link to the corresponding "[year] in poetry" article:

- January 5 — Artur Adson, 87, Estonian poet and critic
- January 21 — Sandro Penna, 70, Italian
- February 2 — Rashid Hussein, 41, Palestinian Arabic poet in the United States, in fire
- April 7 — Elizabeth Daryush, 96, English poet, daughter of Robert Bridges
- April 11 — Jacques Prévert, 77, French
- September 12 — Robert Lowell, 60, American, from a heart attack
- November 30 — Miloš Crnjanski, 84, Serbian poet and novelist
- December 18 — Louis Untermeyer, 92, American author, poet, anthologist and editor
- December 30 — Katherine C. Biddle, 87, American
- Also — Gitaujali Badruddin, 16, Indian girl poet

== Notes ==
- Britannica Book of the Year 1978 ("for events of 1977"), published by Encyclopædia Britannica 1978 (source of many items in "Works published" section and rarely in other sections)

== See also ==
- Poetry
- List of poetry awards
- List of years in poetry
