= Karin Moe =

Norwegian writer and literary critic (born 1945)

- Born: 3 December 1945 (age 80); Skien, Norway
- Occupation: writer
- Awards: Mads Wiel Nygaard's Endowment; Dobloug Prize

Karin Moe (born 3 December 1945) is a Norwegian writer and literary critic.

She made her literary debut in 1980 with the text collection Kjønnskrift. Other collections are 39 Fyk from 1983, and Sjanger from 1986. She published the experimental novels Blove 1. bok and Blove 2. bok in 1990 and 1993 respectively. Moe was part of the poetic activist group "Stuntpoetene" during the 1980s, along with Jón Sveinbjørn Jónsson, Triztán Vindtorn, Arne Ruste, Thorvald Steen, Erling Kittelsen, Torgeir Rebolledo Pedersen and others.

She was awarded Mads Wiel Nygaards Endowment in 1990.

Awards
Preceded by Ketil Bjørnstad	Recipient of the Mads Wiel Nygaard's Endowment; 1990 (together with Hermann Starheimsæter)	Succeeded by Marit Tusvik
