= Haalke =

Haalke is a surname. Notable people with the surname include:

- Eva Haalke (1912–2003), Norwegian dancer and ballet teacher
- Hjalmar Haalke (1894–1964), Norwegian painter, brother of Eva
- Magnhild Haalke (1885–1984), Norwegian novelist
