= Torgeir Rebolledo Pedersen =

Norwegian architect, poet, playwright and children's writer

- Born: 3 August 1949 (age 77); Nes, Norway
- Education: Architect
- Occupations: Poet, playwright and children's writer
- Awards: Dobloug Prize (2013)

Torgeir Rebolledo Pedersen (born 3 August 1949) is a Norwegian architect, poet, playwright and children's writer. He made his literary debut in 1983 with the poetry collection Tidr. Other collections are Stråmann from 1990, Han som elsket verden from 1993, and I krig og kjærlighet er ennå mye ugjort from 1995. His children's books include God natt, lille abbor from 2006, and Lammet som ikke ville bli lår from 2011. He was awarded the Dobloug Prize in 2013.

Rebolledo Pedersen was part of the poetic activist group "Stuntpoetene" during the 1980s, along with Karin Moe, Triztán Vindtorn, Arne Ruste, Thorvald Steen, Erling Kittelsen, Jón Sveinbjørn Jónsson and others.

== See also ==
- Efrén Rebolledo, his grandfather
