= Vigdis =

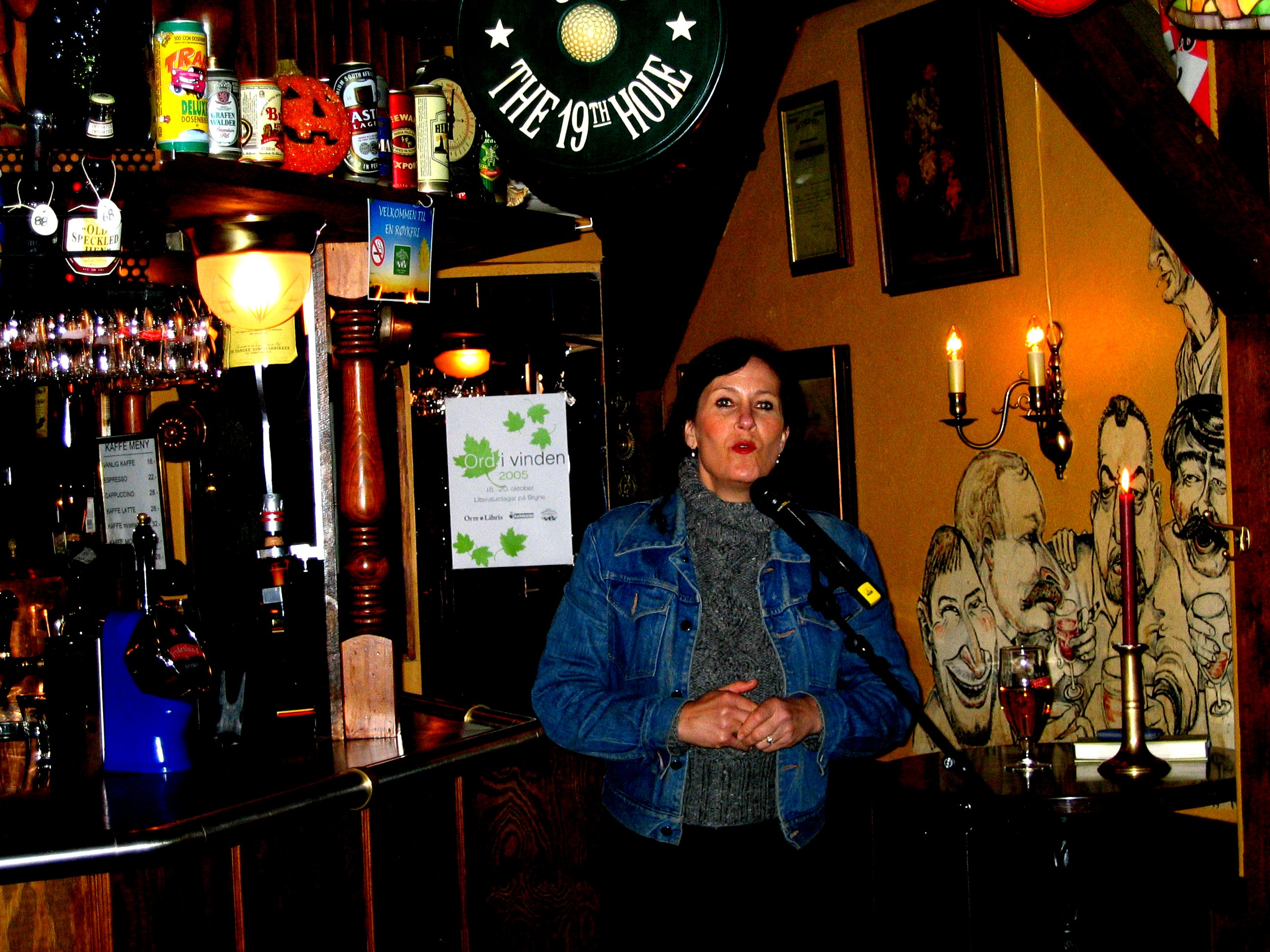
Vigdis hjorth

Vigdis or Vigdís is a Scandinavian and Icelandic feminine given name.

Notable people with the name include:

- Vigdis Hjulstad Belbo (born 1955), Norwegian politician
- Vigdís Finnbogadóttir (born 1930), Icelandic politician
- Vigdís Grímsdóttir (born 1953), Icelandic writer
- Vigdis Giltun (born 1952), Norwegian politician
- Vigdís Hauksdóttir (born 1965), member of the Icelandic parliament
- Vigdis Hjorth (born 1959), Norwegian novelist
- Vigdís Hafliðadóttir (born 1994), Icelandic musician, comedian and actress
- Vigdis Hårsaker (born 1981), Norwegian handball player
- Vigdis Holmeset (fl. 2010s), Norwegian handball coach
- Vigdis Sigmundsdóttir (1934–2023), artist from the Faroe Islands
- Vigdis Moe Skarstein (born 1946), Norwegian librarian
- Vigdis Songe-Møller (born 1949), Norwegian professor of philosophy
- Vigdis Stokkelien (1934–2005), Norwegian journalist and writer
- Vigdis Ystad (1942–2019), Norwegian literary historian

== See also ==
- Vigdis (Laxdæla saga), character from the 13th century Icelandic saga
- Vigdis (film), 1943 Norwegian film centering on a girl named Vigdis Bjørkli
- 1053 Vigdis, bright background asteroid from the central regions of the asteroid belt
