= Jón Sveinbjørn Jónsson =

Norwegian poet, children's writer and translator

- Born: 28 June 1955; Iceland
- Died: 21 November 2008 (aged 53)
- Occupations: Poet, children's writer and translator
- Parent(s): Pétur Sveinbjörn Jónsson (father), Ingjerd Jónsson (mother)

Jón Sveinbjørn Jónsson (28 June 1955 – 21 November 2008) was a Norwegian poet, children's writer and translator, of Icelandic citizenship (Icelandic name Jón Sveinbjörn Pétursson), born and raised in Norway.

He made his literary debut in 1973 with the poetry collection Manus. Among his children's books are Pelle Parafins Bøljeband: Serum, serum (1981) and Håkon Håkonsson (1990). Jónsson was part of the poetic activist group "Stuntpoetene" during the 1980s, along with Karin Moe, Triztán Vindtorn, Arne Ruste, Thorvald Steen, Erling Kittelsen, Torgeir Rebolledo Pedersen and others. He died in November 2008.

== Bibliography ==
- Manus (1973) (poetry)
- Høstbok (1976) (poetry)
- Historier i oktober (1979) (poetry)
- Fartøy (1999) (poetry)
- Det spesielle grep om fjærpennen (2007) (texts by Olav Angell; edited by Jónsson)
