= Jon Peter Rolie =

Norwegian novelist (1945–2020)

- Born: 18 December 1945; Sør-Fron, Norway
- Died: 22 November 2020 (aged 74); Sør-Fron, Norway
- Occupation: Author
- Awards: Mads Wiel Nygaards Endowment (1987)

Jon Peter Rolie (18 December 1945 – 22 November 2020) was a Norwegian novelist.

He made his literary debut in 1977 with the novel Seljesonate. Among his other novels are Mannen som ville finne tidens kilde from 1987, and Livets fest from 1991.

He was awarded Mads Wiel Nygaards Endowment in 1987.

Rolie died in Sør-Fron Municipality in November 2020.

Awards
Preceded by Øystein Wingaard Wolf	Recipient of the Mads Wiel Nygaard's Endowment; 1987	Succeeded by Kari Bøge
