= Gene Dalby =

Norwegian poet

Gene-Haavard Dalby (born 5 May 1957) is a Norwegian poet.

Among his poetry collections are Linedanser på piggtråd from 1979, and Øm ulv from 1990. He published the books Frostknuter in 1982 and Den tatoverte tungen in 1987.

He was awarded Mads Wiel Nygaards Endowment in 1985.

Awards
Preceded by Jan Kjærstad	Recipient of the Mads Wiel Nygaard's Endowment; 1985 (together with Anne Karin Elstad and Tove Lie	Succeeded by Øystein Wingaard Wolf
