= Norwegian Academy Prize in memory of Thorleif Dahl =

Norwegian literary award

The Norwegian Academy Prize in memory of Thorleif Dahl (Det Norske Akademis Pris til minne om Thorleif Dahl) is awarded annually by the Norwegian Academy for Language and Literature (Det Norske Akademi for Sprog og Litteratur). The prize is given in recognition of the eminent literature, poetry or nonfictional work written in riksmål, or to the foremost translation to riksmål of fiction or nonfiction. Since 1991 the prize has been 100,000 kroner (approximately 12,500 €)

== Thorleif Dahl ==
Thorleif Dahl (1891- 1967) was a Norwegian advertising man, publisher, scholar and patron of the arts. He was educated as a classic historian at the University of Oslo. After his elder brother Georg Sverdrup Dahl died in 1922, he saw himself obliged to continue the advertising agency his brother had established, Sverdrup Dahl A / S. His success in business enabled him to donate substantial sums in support of his strong interest in art, culture and enlightenment. In 1956, he created a foundation linked to the Norwegian Academy for Language and Literature. The Norwegian Academy Prize in memory of Thorleif Dahl was named in his honor.

== Prize winners ==
- 1983 – Arnold Eidslott
- 1984 – Astrid Hjertenæs Andersen
- 1985 – Leif Østby
- 1986 – Torborg Nedreaas
- 1987 – Stein Mehren
- 1988 – Bergljot Hobæk Haff
- 1989 – Anne-Lisa Amadou
- 1990 – Jan Jakob Tønseth
- 1991 – Erik Bystad
- 1992 – Egil Kraggerud
- 1993 – Ingard Hauge
- 1994 – Erik Egeberg
- 1995 – Kjell Heggelund
- 1996 – Peter R. Holm
- 1997 – Tove Lie
- 1998 – Hans Aaraas
- 1999 – Tor Åge Bringsværd
- 2000 – Georg Johannesen
- 2001 – Sven Kærup Bjørneboe
- 2002 – Dag Østerberg
- 2003 – Arne Worren
- 2004 – Kjell Askildsen
- 2005 – Torgeir Schjerven
- 2006 – Sverre Dahl
- 2007 – Marianne Gullestad
- 2008 – Arild Stubhaug
- 2009 – Ingvar Ambjørnsen
- 2010 - Torstein Bugge Høverstad
- 2011 - Beate Vibe
- 2012 - Espen Stueland
- 2013 - Jan Kjærstad
- 2014 - Arne Ruste
- 2015 - Kaj Skagen
- 2016 - Merete Alfsen
- 2017 - Liv Køltzow
