= Øyvind Berg =

Øyvind Berg may refer to:

- Øyvind Berg (ski jumper)
- Øyvind Berg (lyric poet)
- Øyvind S. Berg, Norwegian motorcycle speedway rider
