= Sigmund Jensen =

Norwegian writer (born 1968)

Sigmund Jensen (born 23 March 1968) is a Norwegian writer. He made his literary debut in 1995 with the short story collection Antikvarens datter. Among his novels are Hvite dverger. Svarte hull from 2002, and Tiberiusklippen from 2008.

He was awarded Mads Wiel Nygaards Endowment in 2004.

Awards
Preceded by Thure Erik Lund	Recipient of the Mads Wiel Nygaard's Endowment; 2004	Succeeded by Eldrid Lunden
