= Helge Vatsend =

Norwegian writer (1928–1994)

Helge Vatsend (25 November 1928 – 24 January 1994) was a Norwegian poet and novelist.

He made his literary debut in 1958 with the poetry collection Du. Other collections are Stenbruddet from 1963, and Fjernsynsdikt from 1982. He published the novel Et hus ved veien in 1965.

He was awarded Mads Wiel Nygaards Endowment in 1982.

Awards
Preceded by Erling Pedersen	Recipient of the Mads Wiel Nygaard's Endowment; 1982 (together with Erling Kittelsen)	Succeeded by Gerd Brantenberg
