= Juvkam =

Juvkam is a surname. Notable people with the surname include:

- Lizzie Juvkam (1883–1969), Norwegian novelist
- Per Juvkam (1907–2003), Norwegian Lutheran bishop
