= Kittelsen =

Kittelsen is a surname. Notable people with the surname include:

- Agnes Kittelsen (born 1980), Norwegian actress
- Erling Kittelsen (born 1946), Norwegian poet, novelist, children's writer, playwright and translator
- Grete Prytz Kittelsen (1917–2010), Norwegian goldsmith, enamel artist, and designer
- Theodor Kittelsen (1857–1914), Norwegian artist
