= Anders Jahre =

Norwegian businessman and philanthropist

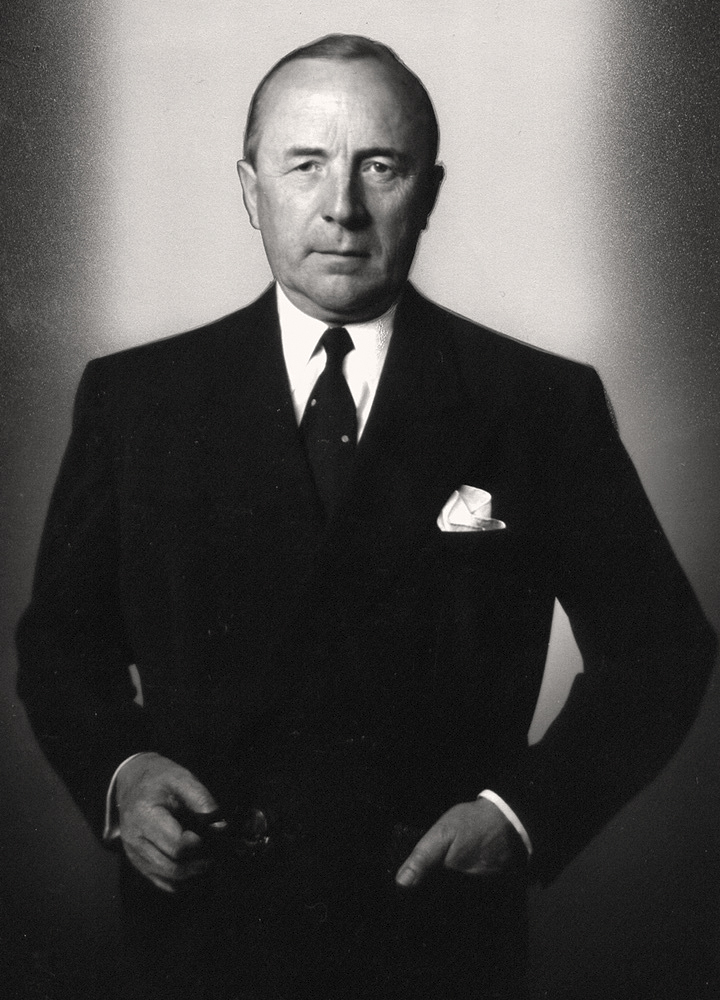
- Anders Jahre in 1955
- Born: 28 May 1891; Sandar Municipality, Norway
- Died: 26 February 1982 (aged 90); Sandefjord Municipality, Norway
- Occupations: Businessman; Philanthropist
- Years active: 1928–1982
- Parent(s): Jørgen Hansen Jahre and Anne Susanne Gulliksen Bøe
- Awards: The Royal Norwegian Order of St. Olav

Anders August Jahre (28 May 1891 – 26 February 1982) was a Norwegian shipping magnate and philanthropist. After his death, it was discovered that he had undertaken tax evasion on a large scale; however, his legacy continues in the form of two foundations, humanitarian and medical, that each award annual cash prizes.

== Early life and education ==
Anders August Jahre was born in Sandar Municipality on 28 May 1891, the son of farmer Jørgen Hansen Jahre and Anne Susanne Gulliksen Bøe.

He was educated in law, and worked as a lawyer in Sandefjord from 1916 until 1928.

== Shipping career ==
Jahre became involved in the whaling industry, and he founded the whaling company A/S Kosmos in 1928, operating out of Sandefjord. He also established Jahres Kjemiske Fabrikker, a processor of whale blubber, as well as establishing a passenger ferry line between Oslo and Kiel.

In 1939 Pankos Operating Company SA was incorporated as a Panamanian corporation. Throughout his lifetime, Jahre steadfastly maintained that he had no ownership interest in Pankos and other foreign companies. Only after his death was it established that Jahre had controlled these entities from incorporation, and that from the 1950s onward he had been the sole owner. During the 1950s the Norwegian authorities commenced an investigation of Jahre's connections to Pankos and subsidiaries. In response and in order to conceal his ownership interest, Jahre claimed that these companies were owned by Aristotle Onassis. The investigation was put on hold when Jahre suggested that it might be possible for Norwegian companies controlled by Jahre to purchase the companies' floating assets from Onassis at market price. Such ships would in that manner become Norwegian-flagged vessels, a goal that at the time was considered important by the Norwegian authorities. This solution was accepted and as a result large sums were transferred abroad to companies ostensibly owned by Onassis. The net result of the transaction, however, was that the cash generated by the sale of the ships was consolidated with Pankos's other assets and became a part of the capital of Jahre's hidden foreign fortune – a fortune that grew substantially in the years thereafter.

To conceal his connection with Pankos, Jahre secretly changed the name of the company in 1958 to Continental Trust Company (CTC). A further step intended to counter speculations regarding Jahre's ownership of CTC was taken in 1976, when the shares of the company were transferred to a Bahamian (later Caymanian) trust called Continental Foundation.

Jahre resigned as CEO of Kosmos in 1978, and appointed his partner Bjørn Bettum to the role.

== Philanthropy ==
Jahre was a major philanthropist. He contributed significantly to the development of the city of Sandefjord. He financed the building of the new town hall which included a library as well as combined cinema, theatre, and concert hall. He also built the Park Hotel, a city museum, and a new crematorium.

In 1948, he established a British institute at the University of Oslo, five years later establishing the Anders Jahre Foundation for the Promotion of Science and setting up awards which are still awarded annually today.

In 1966 he established the Anders Jahres Humanitarian Foundation.

== Honours and awards ==
Jahre was appointed commander of The Royal Norwegian Order of St. Olav in 1950, which was raised to commander with star (Kommandør med stjerne) in 1962.

He was awarded an honorary professorship at the University of Oslo in 1961.

During his lifetime, a statue of himself was erected in front of the Sandefjord Town Hall, a building for which he had provided the funding.

== Personal life ==
Jahre had no children.

He acquired a magnificent mansion in Sandefjord, as well as the 17th-century castle and estate of Osbyholm in Scania, where he created a large art collection.

== Death and legacy ==
Jahre died on 26 February 1982 in Sandefjord. At the time the value of the assets remaining in his foreign fortune totalled some 80 million U.S. dollars.

The son of Odd Gleditsch Sr., Odd Gleditsch Jr., said in 2017 that his father, who had been a close friend of Jahre, was convinced that he had been trying to find a way to repatriate his fortune back to Norway before he died.

=== Legal issues ===
After his death there was much controversy surrounding alleged tax fraud, and hidden funds in overseas accounts. In 1984, the Norwegian government put forward a tax claim against the Jahre estate. A series of legal proceedings in the 2000s succeeded in returning part of the fortune to Norway from accounts on the Cayman Islands.

In 1999 Britain's highest court (sitting as the Privy Council) confirmed that Continental Foundation was not a validly established trust.

Because documents relating to CTC had surfaced during an audit of Jahre's businesses in 1979, the tax authorities initiated a new round of investigations. The investigations resulted in a tax claim being levied against Jahre in 1983 in an amount in excess of 335 million Norwegian kroner, the largest tax claim that had ever been assessed in Norway for tax avoidance. The tax claim was contested and eventually accepted in 1993.

In 1994 the administrator of Jahre's estate came into possession of documents that confirmed Jahre's unlimited control over the above-referenced foreign assets, as well as Jahre's many efforts, over a period of more than 40 years, to conceal that control from the authorities.

At the time of Jahre's death in 1982 the value of the assets remaining in his foreign fortune totalled some 80 million U.S. dollars. There is no other known instance in Norway of tax avoidance on such a large scale or over such an extended period.

In 1998 Kosmos AS asserted that it was the true owner of the foreign assets. Litigation ensued, but in 2003 Kosmos AS, by its owner Eikland AS/Morits Skaugen, discontinued the proceeding.

Two Norwegian judgements, from 2002 and 2003 respectively, reflect that Jahre had ultimate control and effective ownership of the above-referenced foreign fortune during his lifetime.

Through three separate settlements with, respectively, Jahre's main banking connection (Lazard) and certain Cayman interests, the Jahre estate recovered approximately 720 million Norwegian kroner. The amount would have been substantially higher but for the actions of an expatriate Norwegian, Thorleif Monsen, who in the 1970s was based in the Cayman Islands. In that period, Monsen undertook a fiduciary role v.a.v. Jahre and his foreign fortune and acted as the straw man who, among other things, assisted with the transfer of the shares of CTC to Continental Foundation in 1976. After Jahre's death in 1982 Monsen took advantage of his fiduciary position to embezzle substantial assets from the foreign fortune. Those assets were used by Monsen and his children for private investments and personal expenses, as well as to finance legal challenges to the Jahre estate's efforts to recover and repatriate the foreign fortune.

=== Ongoing philanthropic legacy ===
==== Anders Jahre science foundation and science awards ====
In 1953, Jahre donated one million Norwegian kroner to the University of Oslo, and later gave other endowments, which were used to establish the Anders Jahre Foundation for the Promotion of Science (Anders Jahres Fond til vitenskapens fremme). Half of the foundation's funds are earmarked for medical science and research, with 25 per cent each going to the legal profession and the chemical and technical fields. He also determined that that part of the funds should to be used to award an annual medical prize for outstanding international work.

The Anders Jahre's Award for Medical Research (Anders Jahres medisinske pris) was bestowed for the first time in 1960, and is awarded annually by the university, worth NOK 1,000,000 in 2024. In 1965, the inaugural Anders Jahre Prize for Young Scientists (Anders Jahres pris for yngre forskere) was awarded, which is as of 2024 a grant of NOK 400,000. All previous winners are listed on the university website.

==== Anders Jahre Humanitarian Foundation and culture awards ====
The Anders Jahre Humanitarian Foundation was established by two donations by Jahre on 28 December 1966, providing capital of NOK 20 million. In early and then late 1973, he awarded two gift certificates of 20,000 shares in A/S Kosmos (market value around NOK 17 million), and a further 20,000 shares (market value around NOK 20 million).

The purpose of the foundation is to support initiatives of a humanitarian, cultural, and social nature in Norway, with particular emphasis on businesses in Sandefjord and Vestfold counties, with special consideration to elder care. The board makes a distribution each year in June.

Since 1990, the foundation has awarded the Anders Jahre Culture Prize (Anders Jahres kulturpris), with the amount dependent on what the board determines for each individual award. It is an honorary reward to Norwegian or foreign individuals or institutions who have made a significant contribution, in particular to Norwegian cultural life. From 1996, additional prizes for younger artists were included in some years.

Winners of the award include:

- 1990 Asbjørn Aarnes, historian, and Nils Aas, sculptor
- 1991 Mariss Jansons, Latvian conductor
- 1992 Benny Motzfeldt, artist, and Halldis Moren Vesaas, poet and translator
- 1993 Robert Levin, pianist, and Stein Mehren, poet and essayist
- 1994 Jakob Weidemann, artist
- 1995 Ingrid Bjoner, soprano singer, and Jan Garbarek, jazz saxophonist
- 1996 Liv Ullmann, actress; junior prize to Gjertrud Jynge
- 1997 Arne Nordheim, composer, and Gordon Hølmebakk, writer and editor; junior prize to Gisle Kverndokk, composer, and Cathrine Grøndahl, poet
- 1998 Bergljot Hobæk Haff, writer and teacher, and Bentein Baardson, actor and theatre director; junior prize to Nikolaj Frobenius, writer, and Herborg Kråkevik, singer and actress
- 1999 Leif Ove Andsnes, musician, Solveig Kringlebotn, soprano, and Truls Mørk, musician
- 2000 Liv Dommersnes, actress, and Frans Widerberg, artist; junior prize to Andrea Bræin Hovig and Per Enoksson
- 2001 Knut Skram, baritone singer, and Knut Ødegård, artist; junior prize to Kari Postma Sundan and Steinar Opstad, poet
- 2002 Tone Vigeland, jewellery designer, and Jan Groth; junior prize to Synnøve Øyen and Tomas Ramberg
- 2003 Sverre Fehn and Kjetil Trædal Thorsen, architects
- 2004 Ingvar Ambjørnsen, writer, and Geir Kjetsaa, academic; junior prize to Bjarte Breiteig, writer, and Alexander Rybak, actor and musician
- 2005 Håkon Bleken and Jens Johannessen, artists; junior prize to Sverre Koren Bjertnæs and Christoffer Fjeldstad
- 2006 Jon Fosse, author, Svein Sturla Hungnes, actor and theatre director, and Toralv Maurstad, actor
- 2007 Karin Krog, jazz singer, and Arve Tellefsen, violinist; junior prize to Trondheimsolistene
- 2008 Ulla-Mari Brantenberg, artist, and Peter Opsvik, industrial designer; junior prize to Tuva Gonsholt and Daniel Rybakken
- 2009 Mari Boine, singer, and Espen Giljane, ballet dancer and teacher
- 2010 Soon-Mi Chung and Stepan Barratt-Due, musicians, and Tom Sandberg, art photographer; junior prize to Barratt Due Institute of Music junior orchestra and Unn Fahlstrøm
- 2011 Kristian Blystad and Bård Breivik, sculptors; junior prize to Kristine Roald Sandøy and Signe Løvland Solberg
- 2012 Jan Erik Vold, writer and musician, and Kari and Kjell Risvik, translators; junior prize to Kaja Schjerven and Christina Gómez Baggethun
- 2013 Lise Fjeldstad, actress, and Stefan Herheim, opera director; junior prize to Birgitte Larsen and Sigrid Strøm Reibo, theatre director
- 2014 Kari Nissen Brodtkorb and Kristin Jarmund, architects; junior prize to Grete Sofie Borud Nybakken and Johanne Borthne/Vilhelm Christensen
- 2015 Torill Kove, filmmaker, and Leonard Rickhard, painter; junior prize to Izer Aliu, filmmaker and Johanne Hestvold, artist
- 2022 Nils Gaup, Deeyah Khan,Margreth Olin, and Joachim Trier, filmmakers (2022)
