= Elin Brodin =

Norwegian novelist (born 1963)

- Born: 4 June 1963 (age 63); Oslo, Norway
- Occupation: Novelist
- Writing career
- Genres: Adult fiction, science fiction, young adult fiction
- Notable awards: Mads Wiel Nygaards Endowment (1992)

Elin Brodin (born 4 June 1963) is a Norwegian novelist. She made her literary debut in 1983 with the novel Morgen i aftenlandet. Among her later novels are Maskedans from 1987, Bedøvelse from 1991, and Bivirkninger from 2007. She has also written young adult fiction.

She was awarded Mads Wiel Nygaards Endowment in 1992.

== Life and career ==
Brodin was born in Oslo on 4 June 1963.

She made her literary debut in 1983, with the novel Morgen i Aftenlandet. Her next novel, Den krydrede vin deals with the so-called butterfly people, who are exceptionally beautiful, nice and super intelligent dropouts. Her novel Ulvinnen from 1986 is a new version of The Jungle Book, where a little girl grows up among wolves, and eventually caught and adapted to human life. Her 1987 novel Maskedans deals with drug abuse and crime.

Askefolket (1988) is a futurist novel, a vision of life after a nuclear disaster, with new human mutants living in primitive societies. De vises sten (1989) is another futurist novel, a satiric treatment of elements of social interactions of the time. In 1989 she issued a novel for young adults, Kjære Timo, formed as a long letter addressed to a diseased person. Another novel for young adults is Fire brave borgere (1990), where four very different persons establish a cohabiting collective.

In 1990 she issued the psychological novel Drager i hodet. Bedøvelse from 1991 is about a divorced man whose daughter is dying from cancer. In 1991 she also wrote two debate books, Pabirdukker, and Kan du ikke tale? In 1992 she wrote another psychological novel, Den europeiske dødebok. Slavenes bok (1993) is a novel for young adults, viewed from the perspective of animals, and En klode full av lys (1994) is a science fiction novel for young adults. Further novels are Skade (1994), and Madonna med barn (1996). Gutten og enhjørningen from 1997 is her first children's book.

Her novel Farvell, Babylon (1998) displays scary sides of reality at the end of the 20th century, and in 1999 she wrote the novel Unaturlig. She has written three ghost novels in collaboration with Henning Hagerup, De dødes språk (2001), Husets nummer (2002), and Banemann (2008). Further Sverm (2003), a novel for young adults, and Jaspis – landet bortenfor (2005), a story for children. Her novel Bivirkninger from 2007 is about a woman psychopath.

== Bibliography ==
- Morning in the Evening Land - novel (1983)
- The Spiced Wine - novel (1985)
- The She-Wolf - novel (1986)
- Maskedance - novel (1987)
- The Ash People - novel (1988)
- Dear Timo - novel (1989)
- The Stone of the Wise - novel (1989)
- Dragons in the Head - novel (1990)
- Four Brave Citizens - young adult novel (1990)
- Paper Dolls - debate book (1991) (co-authored with Adele Johansen)
- Can't You Speak - debate book (1991)
- Anesthesia - novel (1991)
- The European Book of the Dead - novel (1992)
- The Book of the Slaves - young adult novel (1993)

Awards
Preceded by Marit Tusvik	Recipient of the Mads Wiel Nygaard's Endowment; 1992	Succeeded by Cindy Haug
