= Tove Lie =

Norwegian poet

Tove Lie (1942 – 2000) was a Norwegian poet.

She made her literary debut in 1967 with the poetry collection Øyeblikk. Among her other collections are Syrinx from 1970, and Rullesteiner samler ikke mose from 1985.

She was awarded Mads Wiel Nygaards Endowment in 1985.

Awards
Preceded by Jan Kjærstad	Recipient of the Mads Wiel Nygaard's Endowment; 1985 (together with Anne Karin Elstad and Gene Dalby	Succeeded by Øystein Wingaard Wolf
