= Stueland =

Stueland is a surname. Notable people with the surname include:

- Espen Stueland (born 1970), Norwegian poet, novelist, literary critic, and essayist
- George Stueland (1899–1964), American baseball player
