= Hermann Starheimsæter =

Norwegian poet and novelist

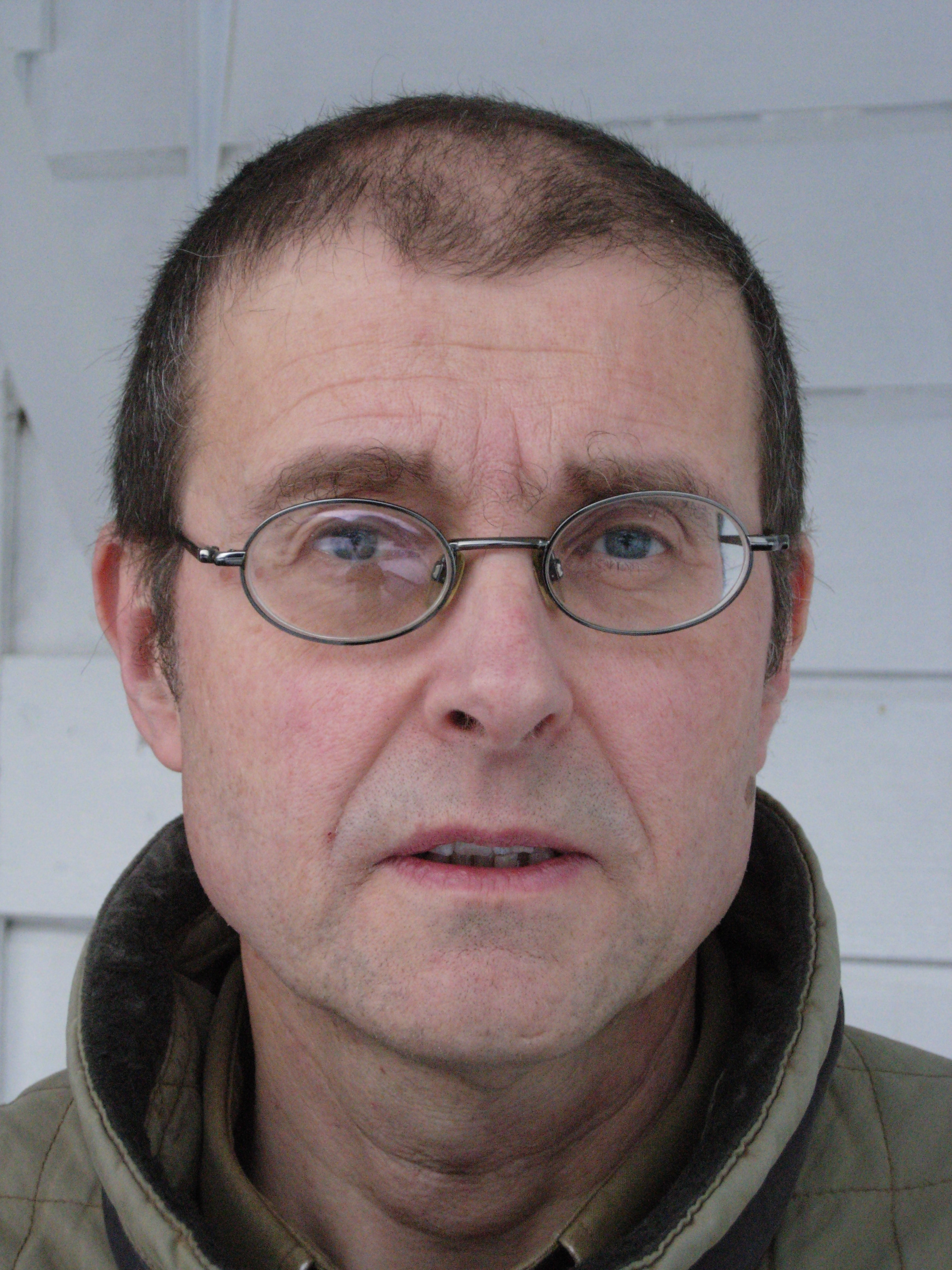
- Born: 2 August 1950 (age 76)
- Occupations: Poet and novelist
- Awards: Mads Wiel Nygaard's Endowment

Hermann Starheimsæter (born 2 August 1950) is a Norwegian poet and novelist.

He made his literary debut in 1980 with the poetry collection Lungeblæretre. Other books are the collection Knutepunkt from 1988, the short story collection Neslesommarfuglen from 1986, and the novel Som om eg ikkje hugsar from 1997.

He was awarded Mads Wiel Nygaard's Endowment in 1990.

Awards
Preceded by Ketil Bjørnstad	Recipient of the Mads Wiel Nygaard's Endowment; 1990 (together with Karin Moe)	Succeeded by Marit Tusvik
