= Erling Kittelsen =

Norwegian poet, novelist, children's writer, playwright and translator

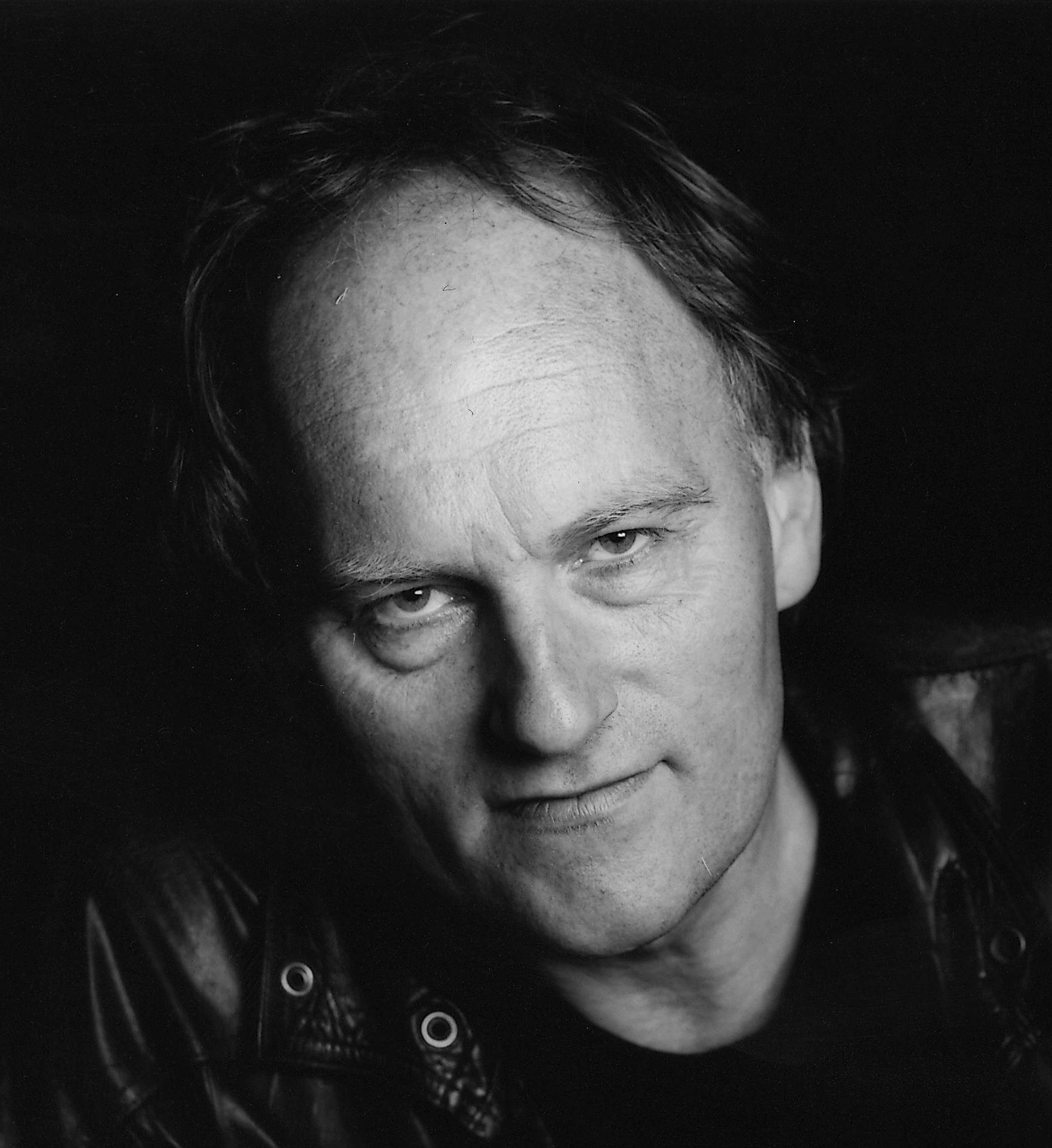
- Born: 10 April 1946 (age 80); Vennesla Municipality, Norway
- Occupations: Poet, novelist, children's writer, playwright and translator
- Awards: Mads Wiel Nygaard's Endowment (1982); Aschehoug Prize (1990); Dobloug Prize (2002)

Erling Kittelsen (born 10 April 1946, Vennesla Municipality) is a Norwegian poet, novelist, children's writer, playwright and translator. He made his literary debut in 1970 with the poetry collection Ville fugler. Kittelsen was part of the poetic action group "Stuntpoetene" during the 1980s, along with Jón Sveinbjørn Jónsson, Triztán Vindtorn, Arne Ruste, Thorvald Steen, Karin Moe, Torgeir Rebolledo Pedersen and others.

He was awarded the Mads Wiel Nygaard's Endowment in 1982, the Aschehoug Prize in 1990, and the Dobloug Prize in 2002.

== Bibliography ==
- Wild birds (poems) 1970
- The tree arches (fable) 1973
- Between the rivers (7 stories) 1976
- Swing village (novel) 1977
- Long live the hull, rise from the junk (children book) 1979
- House in lockdown (biography) 1979
- Day and night at Le (poems) 1981
- Tiu (poetry cycle) 1982
- The wayward story about sollos, sealcats and a pocket of love in the sea (fable) 1983
- In this house (together with Paal-Helge Haugen, poems) 1984
- To tease a Guru, the story of a nameless seal) 1985
- Raka, the storyteller (fable) 1987
- Abiriel´s lion (play) 1988
- She (dialog with an Edda-poem, poetry cycle) 1989
- The spacedrifter (play) 1991
- Pit (fable) 1991
- Fable Vega (fable) 1992
- The house of the seven dolls (play) 1993
- Heaven, Lake (translation of He Dong together with the poet) 1994
- Oceans of moments (translation of Jamshed Masroor together with the poet) 1994
- Fleeing clouds (translating of Muniam Alfaker together with the poet) 1994
- In (48 poems) 1995
- Dainas (translation of Latvian folk-poems) 2006
- Otrap (A critical exposition or wondrous intervals during 46 positions of love, novel) 1998
- On the heaven (play) 2000
- The book of vision (translation of Muniam Alfaker together with Walid al-Kubaisi) 2001
- Vindkald (dialog with an Edda-poem) 2001
- The sail of Brage (dialog with a scaldic poem) 2003
- From vinehouse to mosque (translation together with Finn Thiesen, 5 Persien poets) 2003
- The rooster has crowed, the hero has done everything he had to do (poems, translated from Korean together with Vladimir Thikonov) 2004
- For Inanna (Enheduanna´s poem translated from Sumerian together with Jens Braarvig)
- The receiver (poems) 2005
- Diamond mountains (translation of poems of the dying together with Vladimir Thikonov) 2006
- All that remains (biography) 2007
- When the world whispers (translations of san-stories together with Roger Avenstrup) 2008
- Don´t tell it (play) 2009
- The poem runs like a town (poetry cycle) 2010
- Selected poems (bilingual, Norwegian/English) 2012
- I, Jako (novel) 2013
- The sleeper (play) 2014
- Various authors (2023). Jarquín, Carlos Javier (ed.). Canto planetario: hermandad en la Tierra. Costa Rica: HC Editores. ISBN 979-8850092115.
