= Stubhaug =

Stubhaug is a Norwegian surname. Notable people with the surname include:

- Arild Stubhaug (born 1948), Norwegian mathematician, poet and writer
- Lars Stubhaug (born 1990), Norwegian footballer
