= Aud Korbøl =

Norwegian sociologist and novelist

Aud Korbøl (born 1 October 1940) is a Norwegian sociologist and novelist. She made her literary debut in 1989 with Pell'ongen og je. Among her novels are Leiegårdsvalsen from 1992, Noe gikk forbi from 1996, and Det er from 2002.

She was awarded Mads Wiel Nygaards Endowment in 1996.

Awards
Preceded by Tom Lotherington	Recipient of the Mads Wiel Nygaard's Endowment; 1996	Succeeded by Torild Wardenær
