= Aasne Linnestå =

Norwegian writer

Aasne Linnestå (born 3 December 1963) is a Norwegian author, lyricist, and literature critic.

Linnestå is interested in the history of ideas, and studied at the Forfatterstudiet i Bø. She is a freelance writer for Morgenbladet and runs courses in creative writing.

As of 2021, she lives in Svartskog, Nordre Follo.

== Awards and honours ==
- 2016, Mads Wiel Nygaard's Endowment

== Bibliography ==
- Små, hellige løgner – poetry (2000)
- Stanislaw. En forestilling – poetry (2002)
- Utland – novel (2005)
- Krakow – novel (2007)
- Hagesang – novel (2011)
- Morsmål – poetry (2012)
