= Thorleif Dahl =

Norwegian advertising executive and publisher

- Born: 17 March 1891; Oslo, Norway
- Died: 5 September 1967 (aged 76); Oslo, Norway
- Education: University of Oslo
- Occupations: Philologist and businessman

Thorleif Brandtmann Dahl (17 March 1891 – 5 September 1967) was a Norwegian advertising executive, publisher, and philologist.

== Biography ==
He was born in Kristiania (now Oslo), Norway. After graduating with a degree in art in 1909, Dahl began to study philology. His master's thesis was from 1919. After the cand.philol. exam, Thorleif Dahl first joined the foreign service. After the death of his brother Georg Sverdrup Dahl in 1922, he took over the profitable advertising agency which had been established by his brother. In addition to running a business, he was secretary of the Oslo Folkeakademi for 25 years. He was chief editor of the series Aschehougs verdenshistorie, published from 1953 to 1958, and of the series Vårt folks historie, published from 1961 to 1964.

Dahl is remembered for his generous donations to cultural purposes, in particular the funding of the foundation Thorleif Dahls Kulturbibliotek. The core area of the foundation has been to translate Old Norse literature and classic works from antiquity and the Middle Ages into Norwegian language. The Norwegian Academy Prize in memory of Thorleif Dahl is awarded annually by the Norwegian Academy for Language and Literature.
