= Astrid Hjertenæs Andersen =

Norwegian poet and travel-writer

Astrid Hjertenæs Andersen (5 September 1915 – 21 April 1985) was a Norwegian poet and travel-writer. She is a recipient of the Norwegian Critics Prize for Literature (Kritikerprisen), Riksmål Society Literature Prize (Riksmålsprisen), Dobloug Prize (Doblougprisen), and the Norwegian Academy Prize in memory of Thorleif Dahl (Det Norske Akademi for Språk og Litteratur).

== Biography ==
Astrid Gerd Judith Hjertenæs was born in Horten (now Borre) in Vestfold County, Norway. Her father was a naval officer assigned to Karljohansvern. She attended a secretary and journalist school for women (Hallings sekretær- og journalistskole for damer). She later worked as a typist and journalist for Aftenposten, Norway's largest newspaper. In 1939, she married the painter Snorre Andersen (1914–1979), who later illustrated several of her poetry collections. Her work contained nature poems written to her husband's watercolors.

Dating from 1942, she devoted herself entirely writing. Her poems appeared often in both Aftenposten and Dagbladet. From the 1950s, Andersen wrote in the modernist direction of Norwegian post-war poetry. She had studied American poetry and drama during a one-year scholarship at Yale University. The poems show a clear connection to the symbolism of the past century and were often inspired by music and visual art. A strong personal artistic style, often with the use of free forms, together with the suggestive use of images and symbols, characterize her writings.

== Awards ==
Astrid Andersen was awarded the Norwegian Critics Prize for Literature (Kritikerprisen) in 1964, Riksmål Society Literature Prize (Riksmålsprisen) in 1976 and Dobloug Prize (Doblougprisen) in 1984. Additionally in 1984, she received the Norwegian Academy Prize in memory of Thorleif Dahl (Det Norske Akademi for Språk og Litteratur).

== Partial bibliography ==
- De ville traner – poems (1945)
- De unge søylene – poems (1948)
- Skilpaddehagen – poems (1950)
- Strandens kvinner – poems (1955)
- Vandrersken – poems (1957)
- Pastoraler – poems (1960)
- Frokost i det grønne – poems (1964)
- Dr. Gnomen – poems (1967)
- Hyrdefløyten – epistler fra Algerie – travel writing 1968)
- Rosenbusken – poems (1972)
- Svaner og nåtid – epistler fra Island – travel writing (1973)
- Et våroffer – poems (1976)
- De tyve landskaper – poems (1980)
- Samlede dikt – poems (1985)
