= Tom Sandberg (photographer) =

Norwegian photographer (1953–2014)

Tom Sandberg (14 September 1953 – 5 February 2014) was a Norwegian art photographer.

== Early life and education ==
Sandberg was born on 14 September 1953 in Narvik, Norway, the son of Erik Sandberg and Aina Hällström. He grew up in the Grorud Valley in eastern Oslo.

From 1973 until 1976 he studied photography at Trent Polytechnic in Nottingham, England.

== Career ==
Sandberg worked as a photographer from the 1970s. According to Juxtapoz (2022), with his "signature modulating gray scale", he made photographs of "the everyday—dark abstractions of asphalt and sea, the hard edges of an automobile, an ominously curved tunnel, an anonymous figure casting a shadow ... His pictures are subtle yet transformative, studies of stillness that radiate mystery."

== Awards ==
- 2010: Anders Jahre Culture Prize

== Death ==
Sandberg died on 5 February 2014 in Oslo.

== Publications ==
- Fotografier. Oslo: Oktober, 1995. ISBN 9788270946877.
- Tom Sandberg – Photography. Oslo: Astrup Fearnley Museet for Moderne Kunst, 2000. ISBN 8291430217.
- Tom Sandberg: Photographs. New York: Aperture, 2022. ISBN 978-1597115155.

== Films ==
- Bortenfor språket/Beyond language (NRK, 2000) – by Nils Petter Lotherington

== Solo exhibitions ==
- Tom Sandberg: Photographs 1989–2006, MoMA PS1, New York, 2007

== Collections ==
Sandberg's work is held in the following permanent collections:

- Moderna Museet, Stockholm, Sweden: 5 prints (as of 6 January 2023)
- National Museum of Art, Architecture and Design, Oslo, Norway: 61 objects (as of 6 January 2023)
