= Mads Wiel Nygaard's Endowment =

Norwegian literary award

Mads Wiel Nygaard's Endowment is an annually awarded literary prize from the publishing house Aschehoug. The prize is a recognition of superior literary work. The publisher's editorial management makes the award based on their collective judgement of merit. Applications are not accepted.

The endowment is awarded in recognition of Mads Wiel Nygaard (1898–1952). Nygaard was the chief executive officer of Aschehoug. In 1940, he replaced his father William Martin Nygaard as CEO and served in that position until his own death during November 1952.

== Prize winner ==
- 1953 - Magnhild Haalke and Lizzie Juvkam
- 1954 - Not awarded
- 1955 - Kristian Kristiansen
- 1956 - Not awarded
- 1957 - Not awarded
- 1958 - Egil Rasmussen
- 1959 - Harald Sverdrup
- 1960 - Gunnar Bull Gundersen
- 1961 - Arnulf Øverland
- 1962 - Peter R. Holm
- 1963 - Stein Mehren
- 1964 - Yngvar Hauge
- 1965 - Mikkjel Fønhus and Einar Skjæraasen
- 1966 - Torborg Nedreaas
- 1967 - Knut Hauge
- 1968 - Lars Berg and Kjell Heggelund
- 1969 - Kjell Askildsen and Dag Solstad
- 1970 - Simen Skjønsberg and Vigdis Stokkelien
- 1971 - Sissel Lange-Nielsen and Arild Nyquist
- 1972 - Finn Havrevold, Bjørn Gunnar Olsen, Kåre Prytz and Odd Solumsmoen
- 1973 - Finn Strømsted
- 1974 - Hans Børli
- 1975 - Liv Køltzow
- 1976 - Sidsel Mørck
- 1977 - Halldis Moren Vesaas
- 1978 - Vera Henriksen
- 1979 - Ingeborg Refling Hagen
- 1980 - Karsten Alnæs
- 1981 - Erling Pedersen
- 1982 - Erling Kittelsen and Helge Vatsend
- 1983 - Gerd Brantenberg
- 1984 - Jan Kjærstad
- 1985 - Gene Dalby, Anne Karin Elstad and Tove Lie
- 1986 - Øystein Wingaard Wolf
- 1987 - Jon Peter Rolie
- 1988 - Kari Bøge
- 1989 - Ketil Bjørnstad
- 1990 - Karin Moe and Hermann Starheimsæter
- 1991 - Marit Tusvik
- 1992 - Elin Brodin
- 1993 - Cindy Haug
- 1994 - Merethe Lindstrøm
- 1995 - Tom Lotherington
- 1996 - Aud Korbøl
- 1997 - Torild Wardenær
- 1998 - Unni Lindell
- 1999 - Toril Brekke
- 2000 - Håvard Syvertsen
- 2001 - Odd W. Surén
- 2002 - Jo Nesbø
- 2003 - Thure Erik Lund
- 2004 - Sigmund Jensen
- 2005 - Eldrid Lunden
- 2006 - Bjarte Breiteig
- 2007 - Carl Frode Tiller
- 2008 - Geir Gulliksen
- 2009 - Arne Lygre
- 2010 - Ingrid Storholmen
- 2011 - Kurt Aust
- 2012 - Wenche-Britt Hagabakken
- 2013 - Tom Egeland
- 2014 - Lars Petter Sveen
- 2015 - Helga Flatland
- 2016 - Aasne Linnestå
- 2017 - Inger Elisabeth Hansen
- 2018 - Johan B. Mjønes
- 2019 - Erlend O. Nødtvedt

== Other sources ==
- Rudeng, Erik, Magisteren. Mads Wiel Nygaard. Et hundreårsminne (Oslo: Aschehoug 1998) ISBN 82-03-22352-4
