= Halldis Moren Vesaas Prize =

Norwegian literary prize

The Halldis Moren Vesaas Prize (Norwegian: Halldis Moren Vesaas-prisen) is a Norwegian literary prize which is awarded annually to a Norwegian for lyric or other poetry, which through the quality and magnitude of the work has established a significant voice in Norwegian poetry.

The prize was established by the publisher Olaf Norlis Bokhandel upon Halldis Moren Vesaas' death in 1995. The jury consists of a manager from Norlis, the literary director from another publisher and the current head of the Norwegian Writers' Center. The prize has not been awarded since 2007.

== Winners of the Halldis Moren Vesaas Prize ==
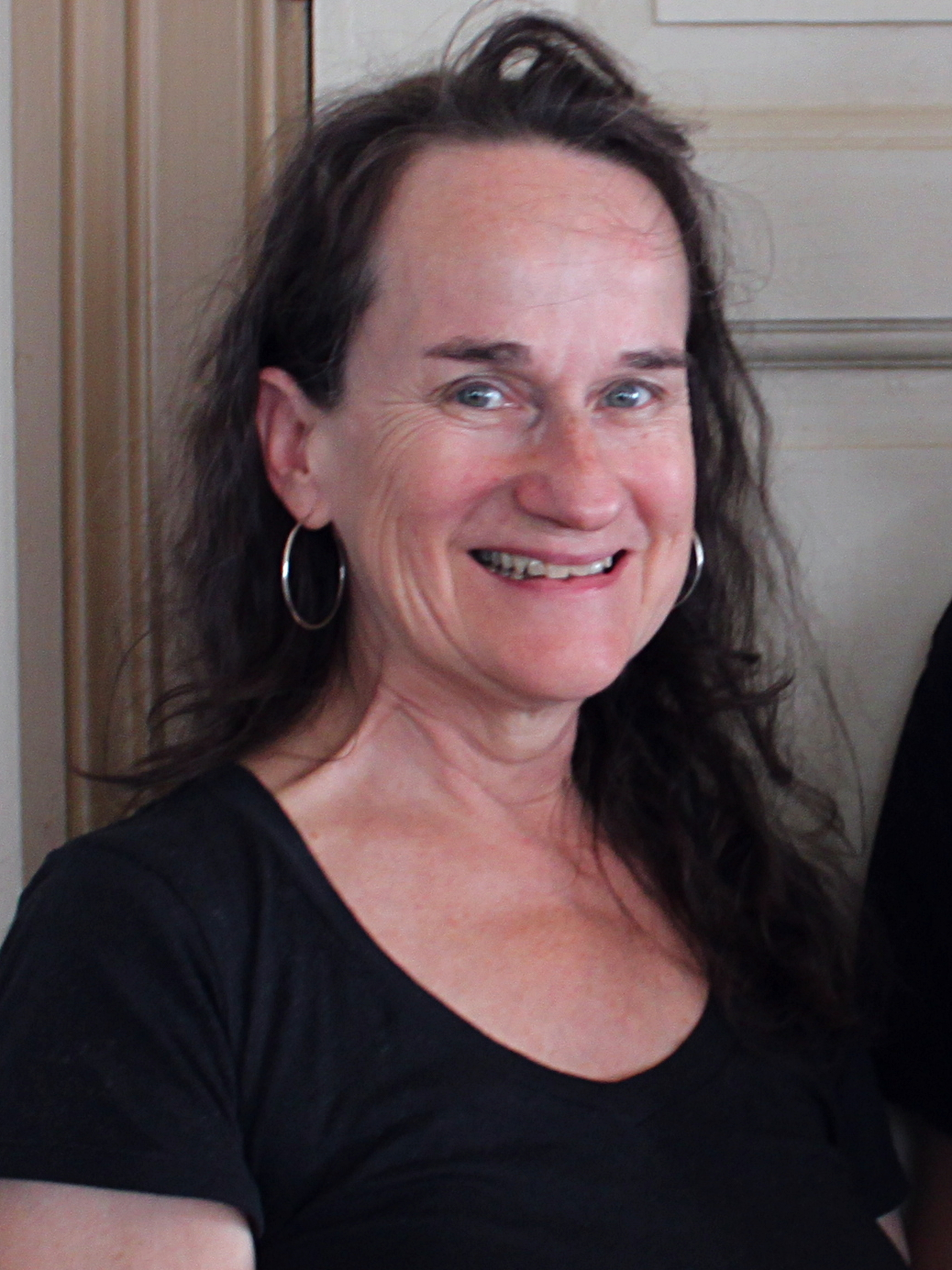
Torild Wardenær received the prize in 1998. Credit: Grethe Tvede (Aust-Agder bibliotek og kulturformidling, 2014)

- 2007 Eldrid Lunden
- 2004 Morten Øen
- 2003 Espen Stueland
- 2002 Torgeir Schjerven
- 2001 Haakon Dahlen
- 2000 Øyvind Berg
- 1999 Georg Johannesen
- 1998 Torild Wardenær
- 1997 Bjørn Aamodt
- 1996 Rune Christiansen
- 1995 Arvid Torgeir Lie
