= Håvard Syvertsen =

Norwegian novelist and short story writer

Håvard Syvertsen (born 4 February 1962) is a Norwegian novelist and short story writer. He made his literary debut in 1992 with the short story collection Nå ville han ikke tenke på det. Among his novels are Etterpå from 1995, I lyset from 2002, and Det håndgripelige from 2010.

He was awarded Mads Wiel Nygaards Endowment in 2000.

He was a member of the Norwegian Authors' Union, but stepped down in 2021 due to disagreements over a free speech case.

Awards
| Preceded by Toril Brekke | Recipient of the Mads Wiel Nygaard's Endowment; 2000 | Succeeded by Odd W. Surén |
