= Cindy Haug =

Norwegian writer

Cindy Kristin Haug
- Born: 28 August 1956; Hamar in Hedmark, Norway
- Died: 23 August 2018 (aged 61)
- Occupation: writer
- Awards: Mads Wiel Nygaard's Endowment (1993)

Cindy Kristin Haug (28 August 1956 – 23 August 2018) was a Norwegian experimental writer and children's writer.

== Personal life ==
Haug was born in Hamar on 28 August 1956.

She died on 23 August 2018.

== Career ==
She wrote in many different genres and experimented through writing with a mix of styles. She made her literary debut in 1982, with Se deg ikke tilbake mot Europa og bli stein...O Eurydike. Launched as a novel, the book is a mixture of poetry and prose.

Among her books are Faen heller flirer fagert from 1983, Mitt liv, fiksjoner (1984), Skumlepper (1989), Gaupehjerte from 1993, Tiende bok from 1994, and Fjærtegn from 1997. Literary historian Øystein Rottem characterised Haug's poetry as postmodern esthetics.

She was awarded Mads Wiel Nygaards Endowment in 1993.

She died during 2018 and was interred in Hamar Cathedral.

== Selected works ==
- Se deg ikke tilbake mot Europa og bli stein...O Eurydike (1982)
- Faen heller flirer fagert (1983)
- Her der – helt nær (1983; children's book)
- Mitt liv, fiksjoner (1984)
- Sort, sofistikert (1986; jointly with Fin Serck-Hansen)
- Gaupehjerte (1993)
- Tiende bok (1994)
- Fjærtegn (1997)

Awards
Preceded by Elin Brodin	Recipient of the Mads Wiel Nygaard's Endowment; 1993	Succeeded by Merethe Lindstrøm
