= Morten Øen =

Norwegian poet and author (born 1969)

Morten Øen (born 21 March 1969 in Stavanger) is a Norwegian poet and author. His first work, I grønnskyggene ("The Green Shadows") was published in 1990. He has also worked in translation of poetry from Norwegian to English, and from English to Norwegian.

He won the Oktober Prize in 2001, and the Halldis Moren Vesaas Prize in 2004.
