= Odd W. Surén =

Norwegian novelist, short story writer and non-fiction writer

- Born: 8 March 1961 (age 65)
- Occupations: Novelist, short story writer, non-fiction writer and literary critic
- Awards: Mads Wiel Nygaard's Endowment (2001); Norwegian Critics Prize for Literature (2013)

Odd Wilhelm Surén (born 8 March 1961) is a Norwegian novelist, short story writer and non-fiction writer. He made his literary debut in 1985 with the short story collection Fanger og opprørere. Among his novels are Dråper i havet from 1998, and For hva det er verdt from 2010.

He was awarded Mads Wiel Nygaards Endowment in 2001.

A literary critic for the weekly newspaper Dag og Tid, he received the Norwegian Literature Critics Award for 2013.

Awards
Preceded by Håvard Syvertsen	Recipient of the Mads Wiel Nygaard's Endowment; 2001	Succeeded by Jo Nesbø
