= Eva Haalke =

Norwegian dancer and ballet teacher

Eva Haalke (née Hansen; 2 April 1912 – 24 October 2003) was a Norwegian dancer and ballet teacher. She was born in Trondheim, and was a sister of painter Hjalmar Haalke, and sister-in-law of novelist Magnhild Haalke.

She started learning ballet when she was nine years old. As a young woman she performed in a number of operas and operettas at various Norwegian theatres. After the Second World War she studied the Vaganova method in London. In 1950, she founded a ballet school in Oslo. Among her students were several later professional dancers; the best known is probably Espen Giljane.
