= Bjarte Breiteig =

Norwegian short story writer

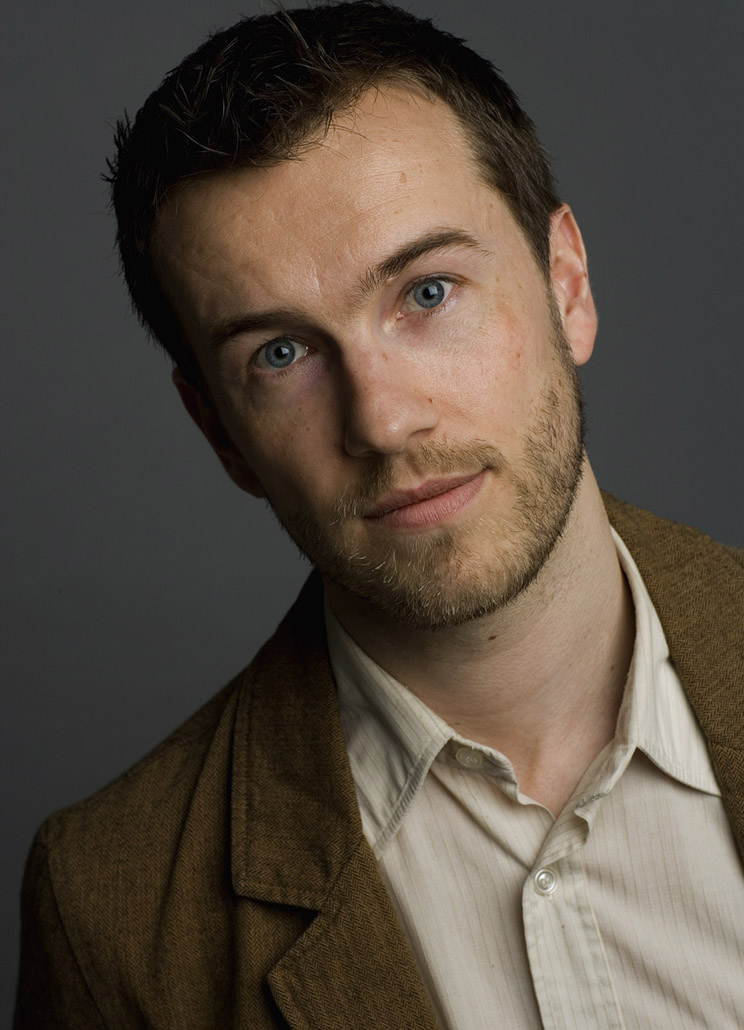
Bjarte Breiteig

Bjarte Breiteig (17 March 1974) is a Norwegian short story writer.

== Early life and education ==
Bjarte Breiteig was born in Kristiansand, Norway.

He studied physics at NTNU in Trondheim, but dropped out after two years to study literature at the same place. He has also studied at the Skrivekunstakademiet and the University of Bergen.

== Career ==
Published in 1998, Breiteig's first short story collection, Fantomsmerter, received glowing reviews and Aschehougs debutantpris. His next collection of short stories, Surrogater was published in 2000.

In 2003, Breiteig was one of five young authors whose work was included in a collection of short stories published under the title of Borders by the European literary project Scritture Giovani with his "Fremover" translated into Welsh, German, English, and Italian.

In 2006, his third short story collection, Folk har begynt å banke på, was published.

== Awards and recognition ==
Breiteig received the Anders Jahre Culture Prize for young artists in 2004, and was awarded the Mads Wiel Nygaards Endowment in 2006.
