= Hjalmar Haalke =

Norwegian painter (1894–1964)

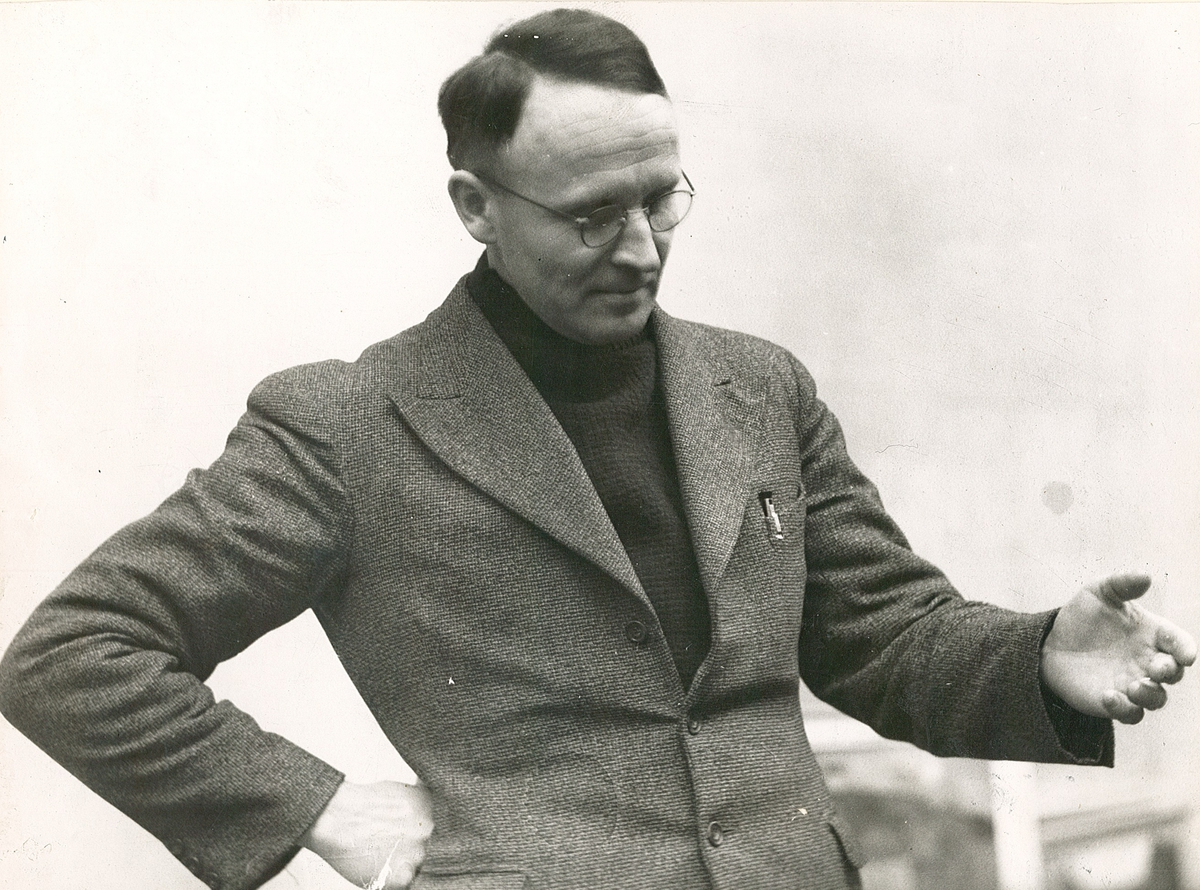
- Born: Hjalmar Kristian Hansen; 12 April 1894; Trondheim, Norway
- Died: 1 December 1964 (aged 70); Oslo, Norway
- Occupation: Painter
- Spouse: Magnhild Haalke
- Relatives: Eva Haalke (sister)

Hjalmar Kristian Haalke (12 April 1894 – 1 December 1964) was a Norwegian painter.

== Biography ==
Born Hjalmar Hansen at Bakklandet in Trondheim, he was the son of Hartwig Julius Hansen (1865–1938) and Therese Kristine Torsnes (1872–1936). In 1919 he took the surname Haalke. He was a brother of dancer and ballet teacher Eva Haalke. In 1922, he married his second cousin, novelist Magnhild Haalke.

He trained at the Norwegian National Academy of Craft and Art Industry from 1915 to 1917, with Eivind Nielsen as an instructor. Haalke debuted at the Høstutstillingen in 1919 with the painting Sneløsning. He studied in Paris, first as a student of Pedro Araujo 1921–22, Roger Bissière and Per Krohg 1926–27, Henry de Waroquier in 1930 and Charles Dufresne 1930–31. He developed the basis for the strict composition and the simplified image elements that became representative of his art.

He was awarded the Henrichsens legat in 1937. Six of his works are owned by the National Gallery of Norway. These include To søstre and Sjodalsvannet from 1936, Ilåa, høst i Jotunheimen from 1948, and Fra Vågå from 1954. He and his wife traveled frequently, principally to locations in France and Italy. Some of his more notable pictures were painted in Provence, Sicily and Amalfi. During the later years of his life, the family lived in Lillehammer. He died at Rikshospitalet in Oslo during 1964. He was a member of the Norwegian Association for Women's Rights.
