= Vigdis Stokkelien =

Norwegian journalist and writer

Vigdis Stokkelien (11 March 1934 – 2005) was a Norwegian journalist, and writer. Her writing includes novels, short stories and children's literature. She made her literary debut in 1967 with the short story collection Dragsug. Among her novels is the trilogy Lille Gibraltar (1972), Båten under storseilet (1982), and Stjerneleden (1984). She was awarded the Mads Wiel Nygaards Endowment in 1970.
