= Vigdis Songe-Møller =

Norwegian philosopher

Vigdis Songe-Møller (born 1 April 1949) is a Norwegian philosopher, Professor Emerita of Philosophy at the University of Bergen. "When it comes to feminist philosophy proper in Norway, the field has been dominated by two figures, namely, Professor Emerita Else Wiestad, of the University of Oslo, and Vigdis Songe-Møller."

Songe-Møller's Philosophy without Women is a feminist exploration of ancient philosophy. Her own experience as a pregnant woman – for whom "the Parmenidean idea of all things existing ultimately as one and self-identical is, to say the least, far from self-evident" – led her to investigate connections between "the Greek philosophers' ideals of unity, self-identity and eternity and their attitudes towards sexuality, reproduction and sexual difference."

== Works ==
- Philosophy without Women: the birth of sexism in Western thought, Continuum, 2002
