= Lizzie Juvkam =

Norwegian novelist (1883–1969)

- Born: 10 October 1883; Drammen, Norway
- Died: 4 September 1969 (aged 85)
- Occupation: Novelist
- Awards: Mads Wiel Nygaard's Endowment

Lizzie Juvkam (10 October 1883 – 4 September 1969) was a Norwegian novelist. She made her literary debut in 1942, with the novel Virgins vei. Among her novels are Antonia og yogien from 1948 and Eneboere from 1952.

She was awarded Mads Wiel Nygaards Endowment in 1953, jointly with Magnhild Haalke.
