= Thure Erik Lund =

Norwegian author and cabinet maker (born 1959)

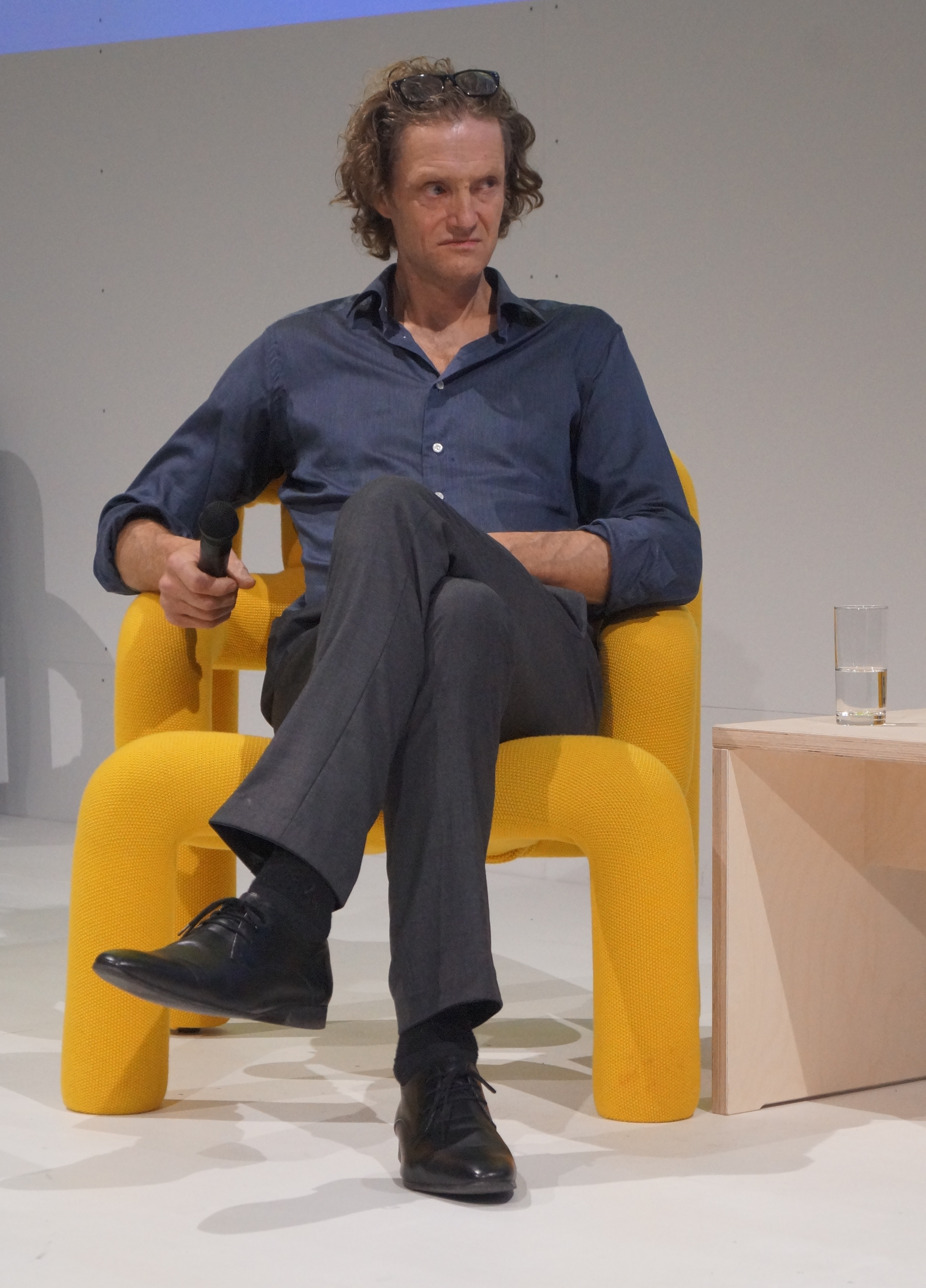
Thure Erik Lund at the Frankfurt Book Fair, 2019

Thure Erik Lund (born 27 June 1959) is a Norwegian author and cabinet maker. He debuted in 1992 with the novel Tanger, for which he won Tarjei Vesaas' debutantpris.

== Bibliography ==
=== Novels ===
- Tanger (1992)
- Leiegården (1994)
- Zalep (1995)
- "Thomas Olsen Myrbråten" series:
  - Grøftetildragelsesmysteriet (1999). The Mystery of What Befell in the Ditch, trans. David M. Smith (And Other Stories, 2026)
  - Compromateria (2002)
  - Elvestengfolket (2003)
  - Uranophilia (2005)
- Inn (2006)
- Compromateria (2009)
- Identitet (2017)

=== Essays ===
- Om naturen – essays (2000)
- Forgreininger – erotic essays (2003)
- Språk og natur – essay (2005)
- Om de nye norske byene og andre essays – essays (2006)

== Awards and honors ==
- Tarjei Vesaas' debutantpris 1992, for Tanger
- Sult-prisen 2000, for Grøftetildragelsesmysteriet
- Mads Wiel Nygaards Endowment 2003
- Kritikerprisen 2005, for Uranophilia
- Dobloug Prize 2009
- Aschehoug Prize 2009
