= Øyvind Berg (lyric poet) =

Norwegian writer

Øyvind Berg (born 14 January 1959) is a Norwegian lyric poet, playwright, actor and translator.

Berg was born in Oslo. He studied to the intermediate level in philosophy, literature and egyptology at the University of Bergen and the University of Tromsø. He was a member of the Norwegian Authors' Union from 1987 to 1988 and 1993 to 1996. He was selected to serve on the Arts Council Norway's appeal committee for recognition of new Norwegian literature. In 1997, he was artistic director for Norwegian Festival of Literature. Berg's poetry has been translated into German, English and Danish.

== Bibliography ==
- Retninger – poetry (1982)
- Barn er et hardt språk – poetry (1984)
- Vitenskap for barn – poetry (1985)
- Et foranskutt lyn – poetry (1986)
- Totschweigetaktiken – poetry (1988)
- Kjøter: en sosiodisé – play (1989)
- Lærestykker – play (1990)
- Kunngjøring – poetry (1992)
- Poe si tid – poetry (1993)
- Forskjellig – poetry (1995)
- Kjærlighetc. – poetry (1997)
- Nede fortelling – poetry (2000)
- Chutzpah i måneskinn – poetry, prose (2004)

== Awards ==
- Oktoberprisen 1992
- Brage Prize 1995, for Forskjellig
- Norsk teaterlederforums oversetterpris 1996
- Aschehoug Prize 1999
- Halldis Moren Vesaas-prisen 2000
- Språklig samlings litteraturpris 2002
- Hold Dampen Oppe-prisen 2003
- Danse- og teatersentrums Scenekunstpris 2003

== References and notes ==
- Øyvind Berg in Norske Dramatikeres Forbund (in Norwegian)
- Øyvind Berg in NRK Forfatter (in Norwegian)
- Øyvind Berg in Dagbladet Forfatter(in Norwegian)
- Øyvind Berg in Aftenposten Alex (in Norwegian)
