= Arild Stubhaug =

Norwegian mathematician, poet and biographer (born 1948)

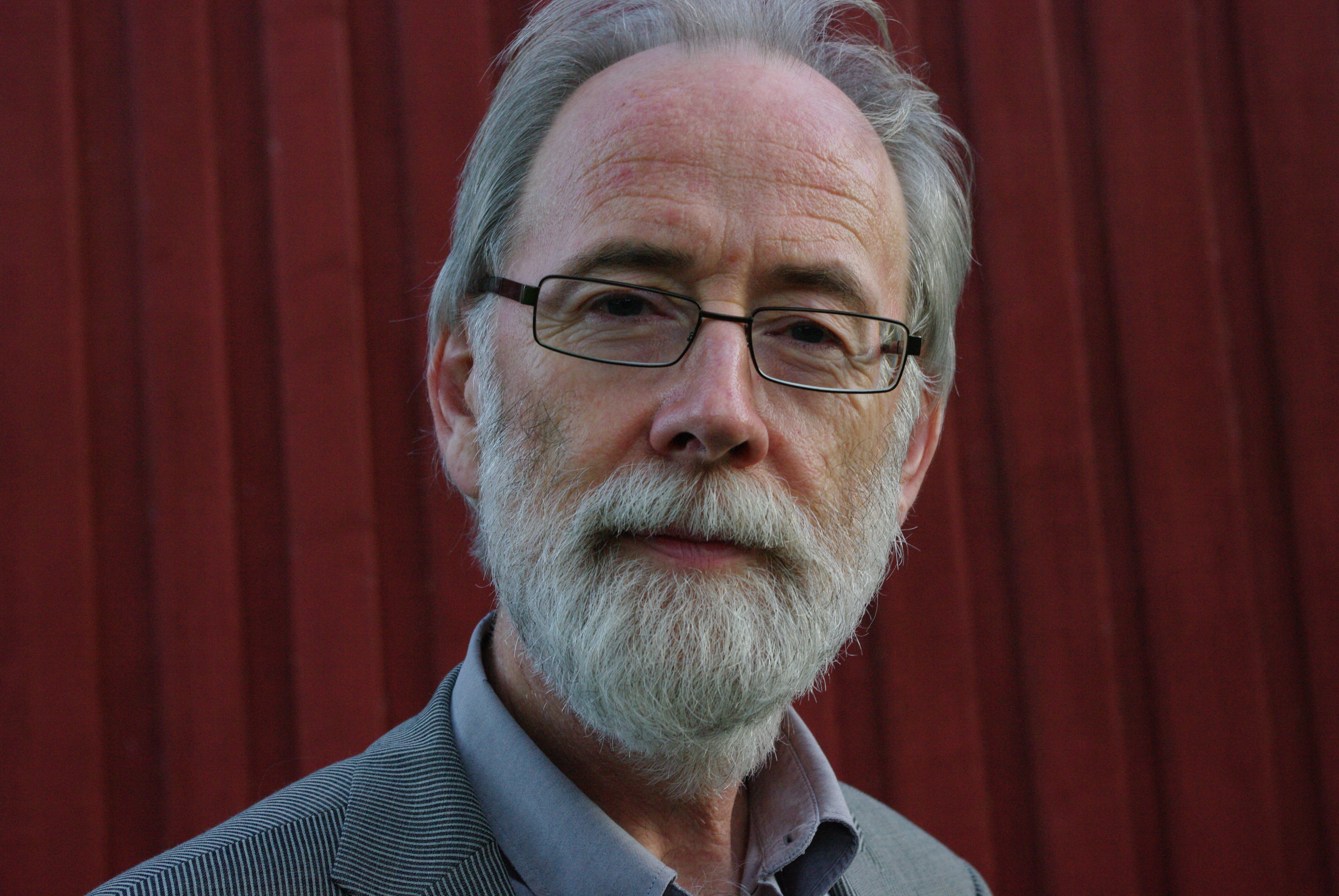
- Born: 5 May 1948 (age 78); Naustdal, Norway
- Education: University of Bergen
- Occupations: Mathematician, poet and biographer
- Spouse: Kari Bøge (m. 1979)
- Awards: Brage Prize (1996); Norwegian Academy Prize in memory of Thorleif Dahl (2008); Dobloug Prize (2010)

Arild Stubhaug (born 25 May 1948) is a Norwegian biographer and poet. He has won several literary awards for his biographies of Norwegian mathematicians.

== Early life and education ==
Stubhaug was born in Naustdal Municipality on 25 May 1948, a son educator Lidvald Stubhaug and nurse Borghild Daltveit. He received a cand.mag degree from the University of Bergen with the subjects mathematics, literature and religion.

== Literary career ==
Stubhaug made his literary debut in 1970 with the poetry collection Utkantane. Further poetry collections are Du ber vatn i hendene from 1973, Eld i sol from 1988, and Lemmata from 2008.

He has written biographies of the mathematicians Sophus Lie, Niels Henrik Abel and Gösta Mittag-Leffler, Jacob Aall, Conrad Nicolai Schwach, and Stein Rokkan. He received the Brage Prize in 1996 for the biography Et foranskutt lyn. Niels Henrik Abel og hans tid, translated into English under the title Niels Henrik Abel and his Times: Called Too Soon by Flames Afar,

He followed up with the 250-year history of the Royal Norwegian Society of Sciences and Letters (2010) and biographies of Jacob Aall (2014) and the social scientist Stein Rokkan (2019).

Stubhaug is married to Kari Bøge.

== Awards ==
- Brage Prize, 1996
- Norsk språkpris, 2001
- Norwegian Academy Prize in memory of Thorleif Dahl, 2008
- Doblougprisen 2010
