= Espen Giljane =

Norwegian ballet teacher and dancer (born 1962)

Espen Giljane (born 28 February 1962 in Oslo) is a Norwegian ballet teacher and dancer. He was the Artistic Director of the Norwegian National Opera and Ballet from 2002 until 2012. Giljane held the post of head of the ballet from August 2002 and was part of the administration of Den Norske Opera & Ballet. Since 2015 he has been a faculty member of the Juilliard School in New York City.

== Training and Career ==
Giljane trained under Eva Haalke, with Den Norske Opera's ballet school (1976–78) and then at the School of American Ballet. From 1981–95 he was a dancer with the New York City Ballet.

He also danced with Makarova and Company on Broadway and in Cynthia and Fernando Live at City Center. He has been a guest teacher at the New York City Ballet since 1994, and has also taught at the Royal Swedish Ballet, Royal Danish Ballet, Finnish National Ballet, School of American Ballet, Alvin Ailey, Feld Ballets NY, Carte Blanche, Cullberg Ballet, Maggio Danza, Metropolitan Opera Ballet, Washington Ballet, Cedar Lake, Steps on Broadway, David Howard Dance Center, and Ballet Academy East.

Giljane was the 2009 recipient of the Anders Jahres kulturpris with Mari Boine and was knighted by the King of Norway in 2012.
