= Torild Wardenær =

Norwegian poet and playwright (born 1951)

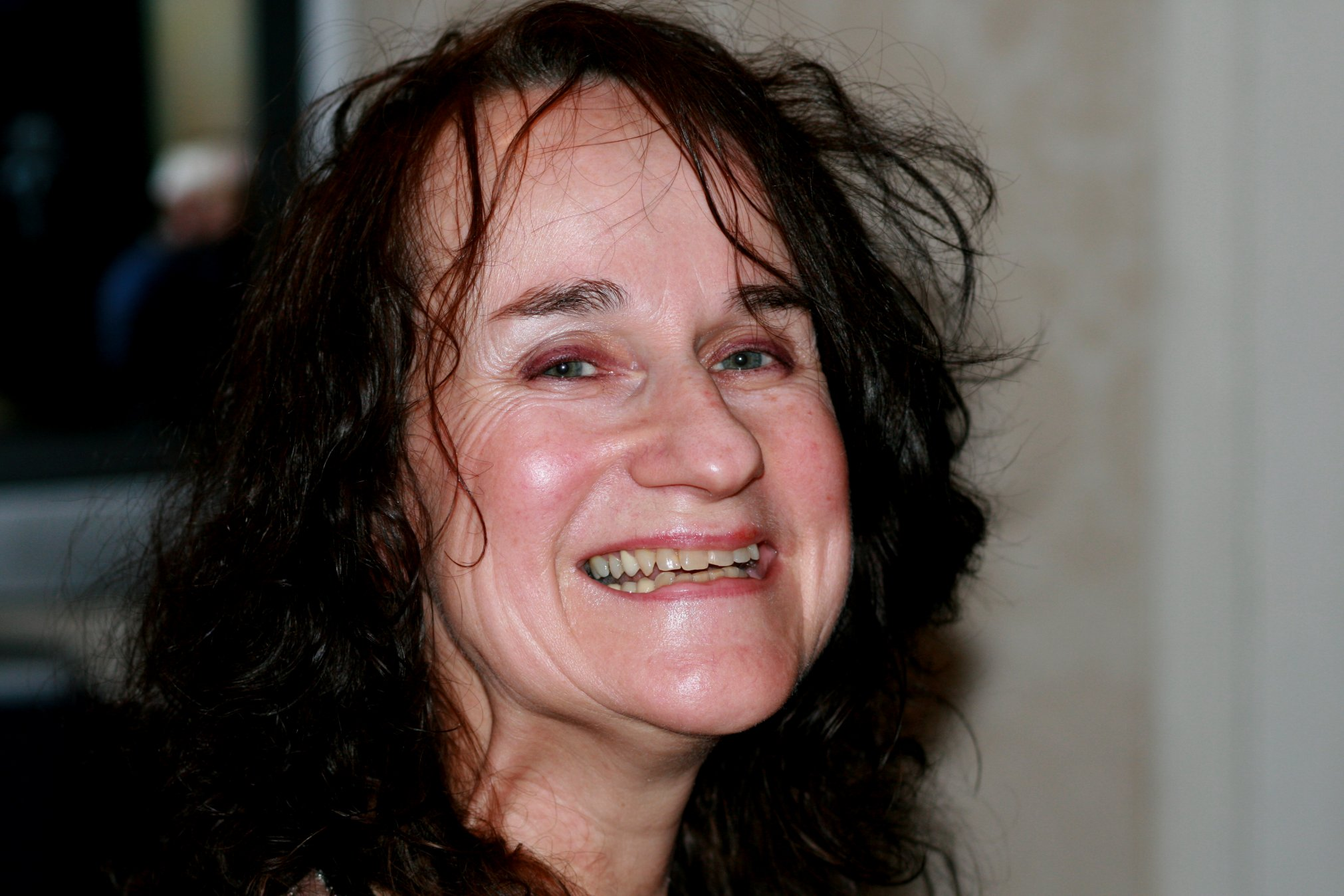
- Torild Wardenær
- Born: 30 November 1951 (age 74); Stavanger, Norway
- Occupations: Poet, playwright
- Awards: Mads Wiel Nygaards Endowment (1997); Herman Wildenvey Poetry Award (1997); Halldis Moren Vesaas Prize (1998); Dobloug Prize (2014)

Torild Wardenær (born 30 November 1951) is a Norwegian poet and playwright. She hails from Stavanger.

She made her literary debut 1994 with the poetry collection I pionértiden, which earned her Aschehoug's debutant prize. She received the Halldis Moren Vesaas Prize in 1998. She was awarded the Mads Wiel Nygaards Endowment and Herman Wildenvey Poetry Award in 1997. Among her later collections are Paradiseffekten (2004) and PSI (2007).
