= Erling Pedersen =

Norwegian writer

- Born: 15 January 1947 (age 79); Romsdal, Møre og Romsdal, Norway
- Occupations: Novelist, writer
- Writing career
- Period: 1972–present
- Genres: Short stories and children's stories

Erling Pedersen (born 15 January 1947) is a Norwegian novelist, writer of short stories, and children's writer.

== Biography ==
Erling Pedersen was born Romsdal (in the present-day Rauma Municipality) in Møre og Romsdal county, Norway. Pedersen moved to Hedrum Municipality (now part of Larvik Municipality) as a teacher in 1973. He was worked as a teacher until 1980.

He made his literary début in 1972 with the short story collection Rottenes konge, for which he was awarded the Tarjei Vesaas' debutantpris. He has written several books for adults, youth and children, and several youth books are published abroad. Pedersen is also a playwrights, with a series of performances on radio and TV. Among his children's books are Blindgjenger from 1982 and På dypt vann from 1985. He has been translated into several languages.

Pedersen's breakthrough with critics and audiences came with Skredesyklusen – Din plass på jorda (1981), Solregn over Skrede (1991), Smaken av jern (1998) and Brødre (2001).

Pedersen followed four generations throughout the 1900s, and the changes in the Norwegian daily rolled up through the experiences of people. A recent work, Kongens merke (2006), is about war and persecution in Norway during the reign of King Christian IV (1588– 1648). With a reign of more than 59 years, King Christian was the longest-reigning monarch of Denmark–Norway.

== Awards ==
- Tarjei Vesaas' debutantpris (1972), for Rottenes konge
- Mads Wiel Nygaard's Endowment (1981)
- Språklig samlings litteraturpris (1982)
- Rauma kommunes kulturpris (1991)
- Sonja Hagemanns barne- og ungdomsbokpris (1994), for Operasjon Storm
- Hans Heibergs minnestipend (1997)
- Vestfold fylkeskommunes Kunstnerpris (1999)
- Larvik kommunes kulturpris (2006)
