= Vigdis (Laxdæla saga) =

Character in 13th-century Icelandic saga

== History ==
In the Laxdæla saga, Vigdis is first introduced in the eleventh story. She is introduced as "Thord's wife" and by her ancestry on both sides. This initial description paints her as solely a wife and the sum of her family history. The extent of the family history appears to be there to give context to her being an acceptable wife, as time is taken out of this description to make note of her maternal uncle's warrior status. The last mention of her in this story outlines her as someone marrying only for money, stating that she married Thord "more for his wealth than his worth". The culmination of this primary description leaves the reader with the impression that Vigdis is of high familial status, making her a catch of a bride – particularly to someone with money but without respect. Thord, by previous descriptions, was not a man to be feared, and the presence of a descendant of, say a warrior, would certainly be beneficial. This is to say, that at first introduction Vigdis appears to be in a transactional marriage.

== Summary ==
The most mentions of Vigdis span stories fourteen through sixteen where she is framed as a much stronger woman than may have been assumed from her introduction. A relative of hers is on the run (the exact relation is never specified), and seeks her out for protection. Thorolf, the relative, makes note of the fact that Vigdis is "made of sterner stuff than her husband". It is at this description that the possibility of another reason for her ancestral recounting is revealed. Vigdis agrees to offer him protection based on their relation, but also based on her seeming approval of his behavior. Thorolf killed Hall after he tried to give Thorolf a lesser portion of the day's fishing catch, and then ended up with all of it after their brawl was interrupted. While agreeing to offer protection, Vigdis clarifies that as a woman she can do very little and that with powerful men after him and her husband will not be a "hero". Vigdis situates Thorolf in a storage shed and informs her husband of their visitor. Despite Thord saying that Thorolf could not stay due to the danger that it would put him in, Thorolf stayed for the duration of the winter. This makes it clear who truly oversees the household.

Ingjald, the father of the man Thorolf killed, came to their town at the end of the winter and asked Thord for the location of the man who killed his son. After an initial denial of any knowledge of such a person, Thord was persuaded by money to give up Thorolf's location. Vigdis asked after this conversation and her husband told her that he agreed to have their property searched so they could be done with Ingjald and had sent Thorolf away with a slave. After the property was cleared, Vigdis learned from the slave that her husband had her relative placed directly on Ingjald's path back to his boats. She offered the slave his freedom in exchange for relocating Thorolf somewhere safe, with Thorolf Red-nose. This presents Thord as a weak man unwilling to protect his family in the face of money, and Vigdis as both smarter than he gave her credit for and very influential over Thord. She figured out his plan and ranks high enough in the household to free a slave who technically disobeyed Thord's orders.

Upon the arrival of Thorolf and the slave to Thorolf Red-nose's the imbalance in character between Thord and Vigdis is again acknowledged. Thorolf Red-nose speaks highly of Vigdis's behavior in this situation and says that it's a pity she is "so poorly married". It speaks to Vigdis's integrity that on the basis of only her name and a few tokens, this man was willing to take in and protect a family member of hers.

Unable to catch Thorolf, Ingjald turned his fury on Thord. Vigdis had gathered a number of men from nearby, who all came when sent word. This, again, speaks of her integrity as they were all willing to come when she asked and needed assistance. Vigdis took hold of the situation and told both her husband and Ingjald that they had gotten what they deserved. She took the money Ingjald had given her husband because he had "come by it dishonestly" and used it to hit Ingjald in the nose so he bled. She then told him off and sent him away. During this, no harm befell Vigdis, nor did anyone argue with her. She said what she meant, and what she said was respected, if begrudgingly. She then uses the money to free the slave that took Thorolf to safety. After this, Vigdis showed open distaste for her husband and divorced him, taking only her belongings. She went to her family who made it clear she owned half of Thord's property. Not only does this speak to her family's closeness, but also their respect for her. They would have been well within their rights to act on their displeasure with her former husband, but they took her lead.

== Other Viking women ==
While Vigdis plays a seemingly small role in the fourteenth, fifteenth, and sixteenth stories in The Saga of the People of Laxardal, the role she does play is telling of Viking women in general. It is she who "announced she was divorcing him" and "showed open enmity" to her husband, Thord Goddi. Other women in this saga make major decisions, such as Unnr. "It is she who makes the dynastic decisions as to whom her female relatives will marry, and she who claims land, in her own name, and then gives it out to her (male) family and followers. It is made clear that Unnr's decisions are good ones, that there is general approval of what she does." The names given to the female characters are just as important as their actions when considering how they were viewed. "We have two women specifically named for their superior intelligence, Unnr the deep-minded, and Jórunn the intelligent woman, in the first one hundred words of the saga. This seems sure to indicate that female intelligence and potential are of importance to the author." While Vigdis does not have a name that distinguishes her as intelligent, she does have a wide-reaching reputation for being of strong character and "effective". She has a relative that seeks her assistance because he's heard that "Vigdís had a much stronger character than Þórðr", who is her husband. This is something that she proves in "extensive detail of character and action being given with respect to a peripheral, female, character."

== Power held by Viking women ==
If a woman lived in a commune, the most common social living format, it is noted that all men must "maintain his own dependents" and this starts with his mother. Not only does this start with his mother, but for many it likely ended there as that was all he could manage. In stating that a mother is a dependent of her son, and more so than his children, she loses autonomy in a way that a man would never, even if he were a dependent. This is important to know as it could have impacted the world in which the writer of Vigdis lived, and possibly her world as well. This style of living originated between 950 and 1000, and while it is not reflected outright in the section of the saga in question, the social implications for women could have seeped in.

Women had expansive rights when it came to property, they could "own, inherit, and manage" it. Some women travelled, and many even freed slaves, something that Vigdis does in The Laxdæla Saga. Women were subject to the laws of the time, but they were not permitted to defend themselves in court, they had to have a man advocate for them. While women did not have the social power they may have wanted, they worked around this by imploring and persuading men to do things at their behest.
