= Peter R. Holm =

Norwegian poet, author and translator (born 1931)

Peter Røwde Holm (born 5 April 1931) is a Norwegian poet, author and translator. Holm has also worked as an observer at the United Nations' arms control and disarmament conferences. Ever since his writing debut in 1955, he has held an important position in Norwegian poetry. He has also published prose and written articles on foreign policy matters.

== Bibliography ==
- Skygger rundt en virkelighet – poetry (1955)
- Din sang om noe annet – poetry (1957)
- Men natten kommer senere – poetry (1959)
- Innvielse ved havet – poetry (1960)
- Stentid – poetry (1962)
- Det plutselige landskapet – poetry (1963)
- Øyeblikkets forvandlinger – poetry (1965)
- Befrielser – poetry (1966)
- Diabas – poetry (1968)
- Synslinjer – poetry (1970)
- Sanndrømt – poetry (1971)
- Isglimt, glødepunkt – poetry (1972)
- Når all min uro stilner – poetry (1973)
- Reisens formler – poetry (1974)
- Portrettalbum – poetry (1975)
- Tegnene tydes – poetry (1976)
- I disse bilder – poetry (1977)
- Vinden stiger – poetry (1978)
- I båten om høsten – poetry (1979)
- Utvalgte poetry – selected poetry (1981)
- Den nye kalde krigen. Perspektiver på øst-vest spenningen – nonfiction (1984)
- Langsom musikk – poetry (1991)
- Sangen om Aral og andre poetry – poetry (1993)
- Samlede dikt – poetry collection (1996)

== Prizes ==
- Sarpsborgprisen 1957
- Mads Wiel Nygaards Endowment 1962
- Norwegian Critics Prize for Literature 1966, for Befrielser
- Riksmål Society Literature Prize 1977
- Det Norske Akademis Pris 1996
