= Zussman =

Zussman is a surname. Notable people with the surname include:

- Julianne Zussman (born 1987), Canadian rugby union player
- Raymond Zussman (1917–1944), United States Army officer and Medal of Honor recipient
- Richard Zussman (born 1983), Canadian television journalist
- Shirley Zussman (1914–2021), American sex therapist

Zussman may also refer to:

- U.S. Army Lt. Raymond Zussman (FS-246), a United States Army cargo ship of 1944–1950 which later served in the United States Fish and Wildlife Service from 1950 to 1963 as MV Penguin II

== See also ==
- Eliezer Zussman-Sofer (1828–1902), Hungarian rabbi
