= Kari Bøge =

Norwegian poet, novelist, short story writer, children's writer and illustrator

- Born: 19 August 1950 (age 76); Stockholm, Sweden
- Occupations: Writer, illustrator
- Spouse: Arild Stubhaug (m. 1979)

Kari Bøge (born 19 August 1950) is a Norwegian poet, novelist, short story writer, children's writer and illustrator.

== Personal life ==
Bøge was born in Stockholm on 19 August 1950, a daughter of Max Harlow Bøge and Ida Detlefsen. She was first married to engineer Rolf Wibe, and later to writer Arild Stubhaug.

== Career ==
She made her literary debut in 1971 with the poetry collection Asmorelda. Her tetralogy Viviann, hvit (1974), Lyset er så hvitt om sommeren (1975), Viviann og Lin (1980) and Søster Viviann (1988) tells the story of an introvert and depressive woman (Viviann) and her way towards joy of life. Among her children's books are I trylleskogen and the prize winning Speilet fanger, both from 1986.

She was awarded Mads Wiel Nygaards Endowment in 1988.
