= Lauren Shakely =

American poet, writer, and publisher

- Occupations: Poet; columnist; publisher
- Employers: Aperture; ARTnews; Clarkson Potter; Metropolitan Museum of Art; Rizzoli
- Family: Warren L. Jones (grandfather)

Lauren Shakely is a poet, columnist, and publisher.

== Personal life ==
Lauren Shakely is the grand-daughter of US Court of Appeals 11th Cir. judge Warren Leroy Jones (died 1993).

== Career ==
Shakely has worked in senior editorial roles at Aperture, ARTnews, the Metropolitan Museum of Art, and Rizzoli. Shakely joined Clarkson Potter around 1988, and by 2009, Shakely was publisher and senior vice president.

== Works ==
- Guilty Bystander (first ed.). New York: Random House, Inc. 1978. ISBN 0-394-42494-8 – via Internet Archive.
- "The Four O'Clocks", Virginia Quarterly Review: 106–107, Winter 1979, ISSN 0042-675X, OCLC 605090813, archived from the original on October 13, 2008
- "Leaving Home, Taking the Hearth". The New York Times. July 1, 2001. p. 5/19. ISSN 0362-4331. OCLC 1645522. Archived from the original on March 3, 2016.
