= Espen Stueland =

Norwegian writer and critic

- Born: 30 May 1970 (age 56); Porsgrunn, Norway
- Occupations: poet, novelist, literary critic and essayist

Espen Stueland (born 30 May 1970) is a Norwegian poet, novelist, literary critic and essayist. He hails from Porsgrunn, but lives in Vossevangen.

Among his books are the novel Kjærlighet i tide og utide (2001), and the poetry collection Å si om seg selv (2003).

He has written books on medical issues, including Gjennom kjøttet – disseksjonen og kroppens kulturhistorie (2009), about the history and significance of dissection, and Pandemiarkivene (2022), where he analyzes historical literary texts on pandemics from literary, cultural and medical perspectives.

He received the Halldis Moren Vesaas Prize in 2003. He was awarded the Dobloug Prize in 2026.
