= Magnhild Haalke =

Norwegian novelist (1885–1984)

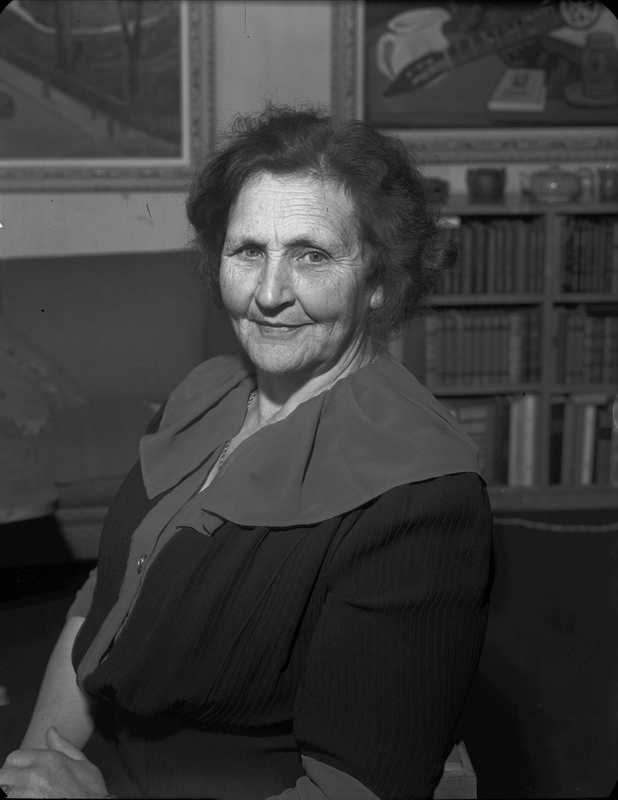
- Haalke in 1949
- Born: Magnhild Camilla Kvaale; 12 August 1885; Vikna Municipality, Norway
- Died: 18 October 1984 (aged 99); Oslo, Norway
- Occupation: novelist
- Spouse: Hjalmar Haalke
- Awards: Gyldendal's Endowment (1949); Mads Wiel Nygaards Endowment (1953); Dobloug Prize (1980)

Magnhild Haalke (12 August 1885 – 18 October 1984) was a Norwegian novelist.

== Biography ==
Magnhild Camilla Kvaale was born in Vikna Municipality, an island municipality off the Namdalen coast in Nord-Trøndelag county, Norway. She was the second of ten children born to Knut Kvaale (1852–1942) and Kaja Augusta Wiig (1863–1948). She worked as a teacher for 30 years, first in Trøndelag, and later in Sør-Odal Municipality in Hedmark.

She made her literary debut in 1935 with the novel Allis sønn. Her deep psychological insight and great environmental descriptions ensured her a lasting place in Norwegian literature. Eventually she wrote nearly 30 books. Haalke made use of strong, colorful language and lush figures of speech. Her novels often focused on adult insensitive treatment of defenseless youth. The role of the mother in childhood development was a frequent subject. In several books she wrote of values relating to childhood environment and family traditions.

Her trilogy Åkfestet (1936), Dagblinket (1937) and Rød haust? (1941) describes the fate of a woman growing up on a small farm. The trilogy was later reworked into two books Grys saga (1950). The trilogy Karenanna Velde (1946), Kaja Augusta (1947) and Kvinneverden (1954) is from a rural district on the coast of Trøndelag. Her final work was her autobiography Mot nytt liv, written at the age of ninety-two.

Haalke was awarded Gyldendal's Endowment in 1949 and the Dobloug Prize in 1980. She was the first recipient of Mads Wiel Nygaards Endowment, which she was awarded in 1953 and which she shared with novelist, Lizzie Juvkam (1883–1969). From 1954, she received a national artist salary from the national government.

== Personal life ==
In 1922, she married her second cousin, artist Hjalmar Kristian Haalke (1894–1964). She died during 1984 and was buried in the cemetery at Nordstrand Church (Nordstrand kirkegård) in Oslo.

== Selected works ==
- Allis sønn, 1935
- Åkfestet, 1936
- Dagblinket, 1937
- Trine Torgersen, 1940
- Rød haust?, 1941
- Kan vi bygge en bedre menneskeslekt?, 1946 (lecture)
- Karenanna Velde, 1946
- Kaja Augusta, 1947
- Grys saga (contains Åkfestet, Dagblinket og Rød haust?), 2 volumes, 1950
- Kvinneverden, 1954
- Serinas hus, 1955
- Munter kvinne, 1957
- Dragspill, 1958 (short stories)
- Kommer far i dag?, 1969
- Sol og skygge, 1971 (short stories)
- Mot nytt liv, 1978 (autobiographical)

Awards
Preceded by Ingeborg Møller and Aksel Sandemose	Recipient of the Gyldendal's Endowment; 1949 (shared with Gunnar Larsen	Succeeded by Egil Rasmussen and Hans Henrik Holm
