= Anne Karin Elstad =

Norwegian author (1938–2012)

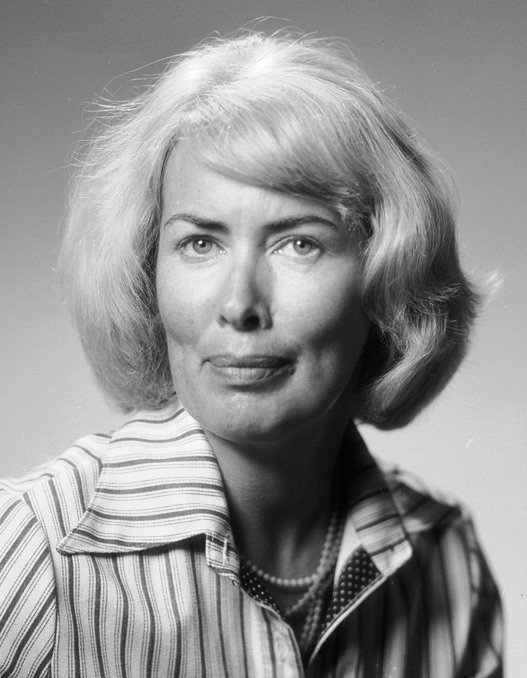
- Elstad in 1976
- Born: Anne Karin Hestnes; 19 January 1938; Halsa Municipality, Norway
- Died: 4 April 2012 (aged 74); Oslo, Norway
- Occupations: Author, teacher
- Spouse(s): Bjørn Elstad (1963–1979) (divorced); Birger Eide (1981–1991) (divorced)
- Writing career
- Genres: Romantic, nationalromantic, saga
- Notable works: The Julie-series, the Innhaug-series

Anne Karin Elstad (19 January 1938 – 4 April 2012) was a Norwegian author known for her book series featuring the character Julie.

== Biography ==
Anne Karin Hestnes was born 19 January 1938, in Halsa Municipality to farm owner Johan Hestnes (1897–1980) and Jenny Roaldset (1900–1950), and grew up in Valsøyfjord Municipality in Møre og Romsdal county, Norway.

She was educated as a teacher from 1959 to 1963, and worked in the profession until 1978, before she dedicated her full-time to writing. She debuted as an author in 1976 with the novel Folket på Innhaug, which is the first of four novels in a popular series about the people who lived at Innhaug. The other three titles are Magret (1977), Nytt rotfeste (1979) and Veiene møtes (1980).

Elstad was also known for her four-part series about Julie. The first book was titled Julie (1993), and it was followed by Som dine dager er (As are your days) (1995), Lenker (Chains) (1998) and Fri (Free) (2000).

Her novel Odel was one of the best-selling books in 2003, and Hjem (2006) had sold more than 100,000 copies when she was awarded the Leserprisen (a prize awarded based on reader input) for it.

She also served on the Board of Den norske Forfatterforening from 1983 to 1987, and was a board member of the Norsk Forfattersentrum from 1991 to 1997.

On 17 June 2006, a compilation of the work by Elstad opened in the old schoolhouse at Otnesbukta; where she herself was present to cut the ribbon for the opening event. William Nygaard, Tom Kristensen and Mia Bull-Gundersen from Aschehoug forlag were also present during the opening to honor Elstad.

At the time of her death, she was working on her fourteenth novel, yet untitled. It is not known how far she had come, and whether or not the book will be published.

=== Personal life, health and death ===
Elstad was married twice, first to her teacher colleague Bjørn Elstad, from whom she took her last name, from 1961 to their divorce in 1978. She was remarried to the publisher's reader Birger Eide in 1981, they divorced ten years later.

In 1986, Elstad suffered her first, albeit minor, stroke. She then suffered yet another stroke in 1992, which rendered her partially paralyzed. She subsequently had to relearn how to walk, talk and write, keeping her away from making new books for almost eight years. She subsequently became an outspoken critic against estrogen treatment, due to its increased risk of strokes.

On 4 April 2012, Elstad died in her home after suffering her third and final stroke. According to her family, she died in her favorite chair while doing the crossword puzzle, one of her favorite activities.

== Bibliography ==
Elstad wrote and published thirteen books during her lifetime, and was working on a fourteenth when she died, aged 74, in 2012.

=== Innhaugfolket ===
- Folket på Innhaug (1976)
- Magret (1977)
- Nytt rotfeste (1979)
- Veiene møtes (1980)

=== Julie ===
- Julie (1993)
- Som dine dager er (1995)
- Lenker (1998)
- Fri (2000)

=== Non-series works ===
- Senere, Lena (1982)
- Sitt eget liv (1983)
- -for dagene er onde (1985)
- Maria, Maria (1988)
- Eg helsar deg, Nordmøre (1989)
- Odel (2003)
- Hjem (2006)

== Awards ==
- Bokhandlerprisen 1982, for Senere, Lena
- Mads Wiel Nygaards Endowment 1985
- Medlemmenes favorittbok, for Folket på Innhaug 1986
- Halsa Municipality cultural prize 1997
- Møre og Romsdal's county cultural prize 2003
- Den norske leserprisen 2003, for Odel
- Den norske leserprisen 2006, for Hjem
