= Øystein Wingaard Wolf =

Norwegian poet

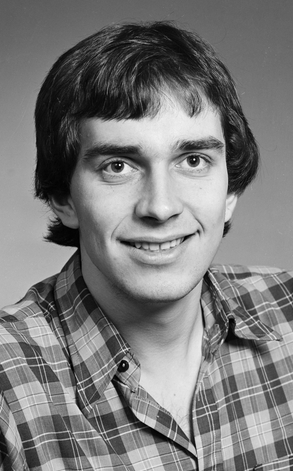
Øystein Wingaard Wolf

Øystein Wingaard Wolf (born 17 April 1958) is a Norwegian poet and author, living and working in Oslo. Since his debut in 1980 (Morderleken), he has published numerous books of poetry, as well as three music albums. He was awarded the Mads Wiel Nygaard's Endowment in 1986.

His father was Jewish and in his works he "tends and irrigates his Jewish roots."

== References and links ==
- Aftenposten newspaper article
