= Marit Tusvik =

Norwegian author, poet and playwright (born 1951)

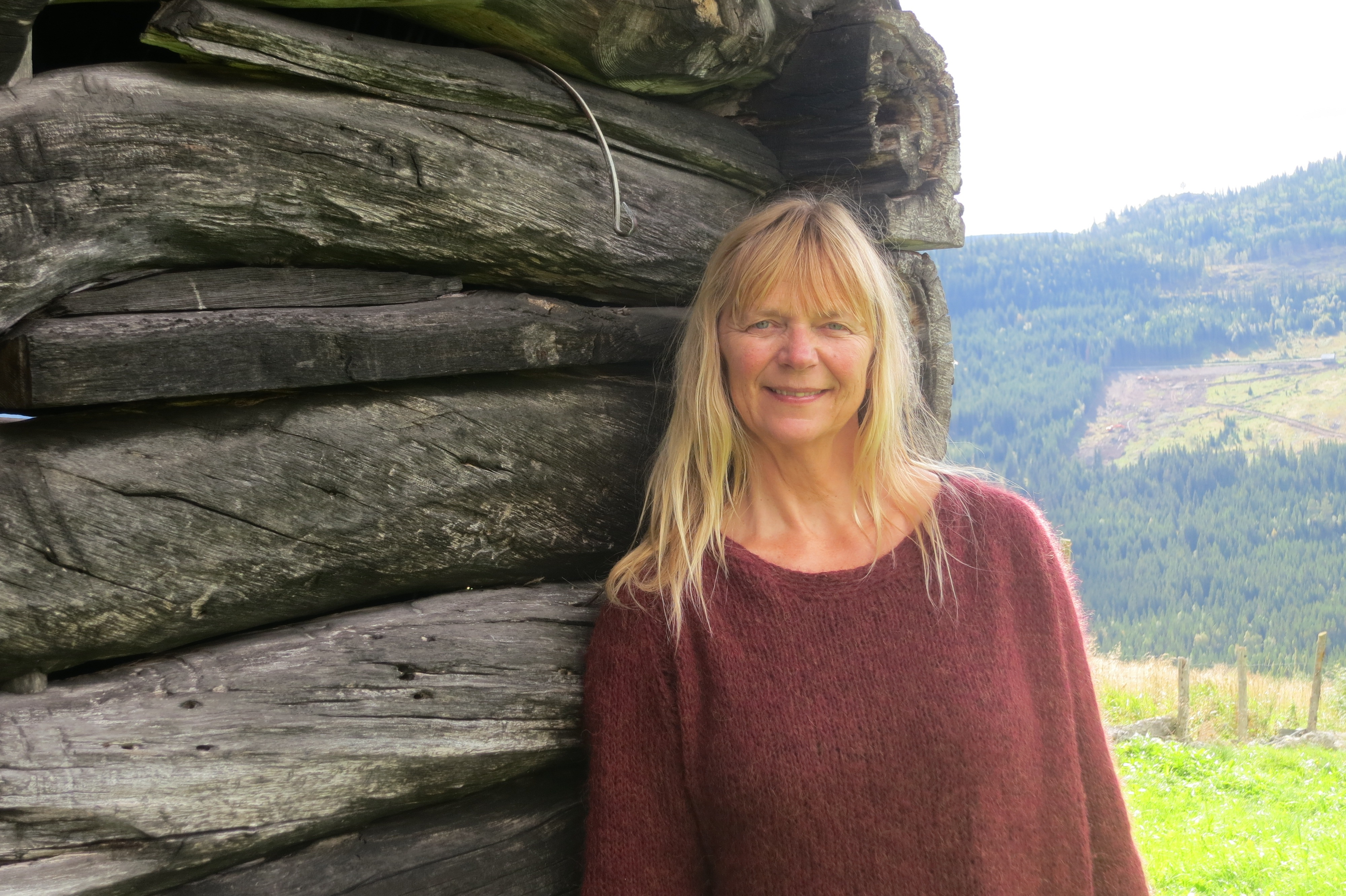
Marit Tusvik

Marit Tusvik (born 13 March 1951, in Høyanger) is a Norwegian author, poet and playwright. Tusvik's works have been translated into multiple languages.

== Bibliography ==
- Reisa til mandarinlandet – poetry (1979)
- Mellom sol og måne – poetry (1984)
- I byen under byen – poetry (1985)
- Jorunn og Janfrid – children's book (1986)
- Hestehov – poetry (1987)
- Katrine – small book (1987)
- Kua som fraus – children's book (1988)
- Bruno Andante og wobbegongen – children's book (1989)
- Hareungen som blei åleine – children's book (1990)
- Mugg – play (1990)
- Petter Larsens dag- og nattbok – children's book (1991)
- Ishuset – novel (1991)
- Etter William – play (1993)
- Alle vakre jenters hambo – play (1994)
- Kvalross i bikini – children's book (1994)
- Bell – novel (1995)
- Hører du månen – film play (1996)
- Gjennomtrekk – poetry (1997)
- Barnas teaterbok – nonfiction for children (1997) (together with Jan E. Hansen & Mari Maurstad)
- Tsaren – play (1998)
- Nord – novel (1999)
- Stille og fint – novel (2002)
- Proppen – children's book (2002, illustrated by the author)
- Den forunderlige historia om Valdemar Blå og reisa gjennom havet – children's book (2003, illustrated by the author)
- Angerhøy – play (2005)
- Sigrid Finne– novel (2007)
- Samlede dikt– poems (2008)

== Prizes ==
- Sokneprest Alfred Andersson-Ryssts fund 1986
- Ibsen Prize 1991
- Nynorsk Literature Prize 1991
- Mads Wiel Nygaards Endowment 1991
- Narvesens kulturpris 1995
- Amalie Skram-prisen 1999
- Dobloug Prize 2004
