= Arne Ruste =

Norwegian poet, essayist, novelist and magazine editor

- Born: 14 February 1942
- Died: 18 October 2026 (aged 84)
- Education: University of Oslo
- Occupations: Poet, essayist, novelist, and magazine editor
- Awards: Gyldendal's Endowment (1978); Norwegian Academy Prize in memory of Thorleif Dahl (2014)

Arne Ruste (14 February 1942 – 18 October 2026) was a Norwegian poet, essayist, novelist, and magazine editor. He made his literary debut in 1973 with the poetry collection Askeladd. He co-edited the magazine Poesi Magasin from 1983 to 1985. He was manager of The Norwegian Writers' Center from 1994 to 1999.

Ruste was awarded the Gyldendal's Endowment in 1978, and the Norwegian Academy Prize in memory of Thorleif Dahl in 2014.

== Early life and literary career ==
Ruste was born in Sel and grew up in Vardal, near Gjøvik. He studied religion, Norwegian and history at the University of Oslo. From 1985 to 1994, he worked as an editor at the publishing house Tiden Norsk Forlag. During the 1980s, he was also a member of the poetry collective Stuntpoetene, which sought to increase public interest in poetry.

In his literary history from 1997, Øystein Rottem analyses Ruste's poetry collections until then. The debut collection Askeladd (1973) is characterized by close relations to everyday objects and environment, a poetic universe filled with sun and moon, wind and ocean, birds and animals. The next collection, Alene går det ikke stort bedre (1974), shows a similar attitude, and includes elements of threats to the harmony. In Bestefar, etc. (1975) there are reflections over the art of identity and poetry. Dronningen kommer! (1978) has more political engagement and society critic. The collection Grenseepisoder (1981) also contains a number of poems from travels in Europe. He was awarded the Gyldendal's Endowment in 1978. He co-edited the magazine Poesi Magasin from 1983 to 1985, and was manager of The Norwegian Writers' Center from 1994 to 1999.

His literary works further include the poetry collections Indre krets (1999) and Søsken for en tid (2001), the latter of which was nominated for the Brage Prize. He published his first novel, Piken i bakspeilet, in 2009. Ruste also translated literary works into Norwegian, including poetry by Ted Hughes and children's books by Roald Dahl and Lewis Carroll.

He was awarded the Norwegian Academy Prize in memory of Thorleif Dahl in 2014, when the jury compared his way of writing about everyday objects to the French poet Francis Ponge.

== Death ==
Ruste died on 18 October 2026, at the age of 84.

Awards
Preceded by Jan Jakob Tønseth	Recipient of the Gyldendal's Endowment; 1978 (shared with Olav Nordrå)	Succeeded by Cecilie Løveid and Wera Sæther
Preceded by Jan Kjærstad	Recipient of the Norwegian Academy Prize in memory of Thorleif Dahl; 2014	Succeeded by Kaj Skagen
