= Thorvald Steen =

Norwegian writer and government scholar (born 1954)

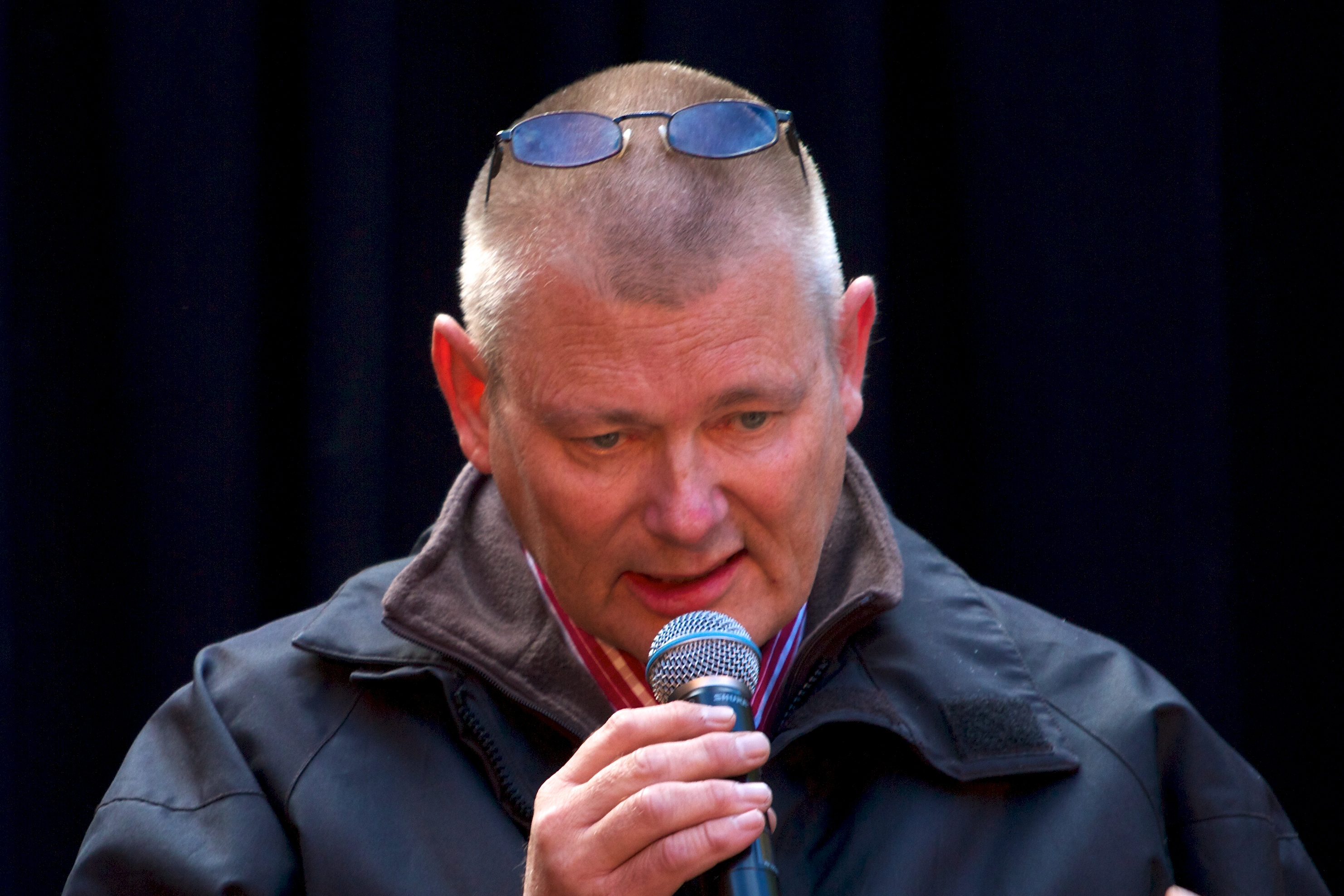
- Born: January 9, 1954 (age 72); Norway
- Occupations: Author, novelist
- Writing career
- Genre: Fiction

Thorvald Steen (born 9 January 1954) is a Norwegian writer and government scholar.

He made his literary debut in 1983, and has subsequently published a wide range of novels, plays, collections of poems, books of short stories, children's books and essays. He has distinguished himself as one of Norway's leading internationally oriented writers. His Norwegian breakthrough came in 1992 with a cycle of poems, Ilden (The Fire) and shortly afterward he achieved international recognition with his creative historical novels Don Carlos (1993), Giovanni (1995), Constantinople (1999), The Little Horse (2002), Camel Clouds (2004) and Lionheart (2010). In 2006 Steen wrote the coming-of-age novel The Weight of Snow Crystals, which was followed in 2008 with the freestanding sequel The Longest Leap.

Steen's work is translated into 26 languages and published in 46 countries. He has received several literary prizes, both at home and abroad. In 1993 he received Gyldendals legat (Gyldendal's Endowment). The Belgian newspaper Le Soir declared Don Carlos one of the five best novels translated into French in 1996. The newspaper Clarin in Argentina chose Steen as “Best new writer” for Don Carlos the same year. In 2001 he received the Norwegian Dobloug Prize for his entire work. The novel Camel Clouds was elected novel of the year by the Turkish newspaper Bir Gun in 2006 and won the Slovak Jan Holly Award in 2007. In 2006 Steen received the Comenius Medal from the University of Bratislava for his historical novels, and in 2010 he received the Thomsen Prize.

Steen was the chairman of The Norwegian Authors' Union (1991–97) and he has been an honorary member of the union since 1997. He has also been chairman of the board in Norla (Norwegian Literature Abroad) since 1997 and a member of the board of PEN since 2003. In 2004 he received a Governmental Stipend from the Norwegian Minister of Culture.

== Bibliography ==
=== Novels/Short Stories ===
- The Invisible Library, 2014
- Balance, 2012
- Lionheart (Løvehjerte) (novel) 2010
- The Longest Leap, 2008
- The Weight of Snow Crystals, 2006
- Bare en siste gang (Just one Last Time), 2005 and 2009
- Camel Clouds, 2004
- The Little Horse, 2002
- Constantinople, 1999
- Kongen av Sahara (King of Sahara), 1997
- Giovanni, 1995
- Don Carlos, 1993
- Tungen (The Tongue), 1991

=== Poems ===
- Under sol og måne (Under Sun and Moon. Photographies by Victor Dimola), 2001
- Alexandrias aske (The Ashes of Alexandria. Poems by Lars Saabye Christensen, Gro Dahle, Paal-Helge Haugen and Thorvald Steen) 1993
- The Fire, 1992
- Månekisten (The Moon Casket), 1987
- Neonulvene (Neonwolfs), 1987
- Vindkommoden (The Wind Chest. Photographies by Per Maning), 1985
- Gjerrige fallskjermer (Stingy Parachutes), 1985
- Hemmeligstemplede roser (Classified Roses), 1983

=== Essays ===
- Den besværlige historien (The Cumbersome History), 2014
- Stories of Istanbul, 2008
- Fra Reykholt til Bosporus (From Reykholt to Bosporus) 2003
- Luftskipet (Airship) 2000
- Jungel. Essays om litteratur og politikk (Jungle. Essays about Literature and Politics), 1996
- En fallskjerm til folket (Parachutes to The People), 1995

=== Children's books ===
- Sometimes You're Absolutely Right(illustrated book), 2015, with Hilde Kramer
- Da pinnsvinet gjorde reven en tjeneste (illustrated book), 2002
- Frosken og sjiraffen og stillheten (illustrated book), 1995
- Da frosken og sjiraffen skulle stupe kråke (illustrated book), 1993
- Frosken og sjiraffen (The Frog and The Giraffe), 1993, illustrated by Marek Woloszyn
- Milli Meter og regnbuen (Milli Meter and The Rainbow) 1992, illustrated by Malgorzata Piotrowska
- Jeg er kanskje en fugl, sa Milli Meter (I Might Be a Bird, said Milli Meter) 1991, illustrated by Malgorzata Piotrowska
- Milli Meter og delfinene (Milli Meter and the Dolphines) 1990, illustrated by Malgorzata Piotrowska

=== Plays ===
- Nidaros, 2013, (music by Timbuktu (Jason Dikaité)
- Desert Storms, 2010, with Tariq Ali
- De tålmodige, 1997

=== Other ===
- Asylet. Gaustad sykehus 150 år (anniversary book) 2005 (ed.)
