= Triztán Vindtorn =

Norwegian poet and performance artist

- Born: Kjell Erik Larsen; 31 July 1942; Drammen, Norway
- Died: 4 March 2009 (aged 66)
- Occupations: Poet; Performance artist
- Awards: Aschehoug Prize; Dobloug Prize

Triztán Vindtorn (31 July 1942 – 4 March 2009), born Kjell Erik Larsen, was a Norwegian poet and performance artist from Drammen. He made his literary debut with the poetry collection Sentrifuge in 1970.

His latest collections were Jeg kan høre din hånd synge (I can hear your hand sing, 2007), and Sirkus for usynlige elefanter (Circus for invisible elephants, 2008).

== Personal life ==
Kjell Erik Larsen's parents were cabinetmaker Asle Larsen and Åse Hafnor Kristiansen. He was married twice, first to Mona Kari Svendsrud and later to Britt Undis Knudsen. He changed his last name to Vindtorn, and signed his first books Kjell Erik Vindtorn. In 1999 he changed his first name to Triztán, after the name of a favorite pub at Ibiza, where he lived periodically. He has two sons, Kenneth Larsen and Asle Larsen.

== Professional life ==
Vindtorn was a sailor from 1961 to 1962. He was educated as textile engineer, and worked in this profession from 1969 to 1970. He worked as a light technician at Det Norske Teatret from 1969 to 1972, and at Oslo Nye Teater from 1971 to 1981. From his literary debut in 1970 he issued almost thirty collections of poetry, all with eccentric titles. His poetry and performances were influenced by futurism, dadaism, surrealism, expressionism and pop art. He was regarded as one of Norway's most distinctive poets. His poetry is full of figurative language, puns and neologisms. In a lengthy article in the literary magazine Vinduet in 1978 Arild Linneberg analyses the reception of Vindtorn's first seven poetry collections by the literary critic. He starts by stating that Vindtorn has been called the only real surrealist among the contemporary Norwegian poets, and later in the article he also gives a detailed analysis of the poem "Kystline" ("Shoreline") from Versjoner i feberpels (Versions in fever pelt, 1975).

As a performance artist Vindtorn performed at the Molde International Jazz Festival, Vossajazz and the Roskilde Festival. In the visual arts he created works using screen-printing technique.

He was a board member of Oslo Nye Teater, and the Norwegian Authors' Union.

Vindtorn was awarded the Aschehoug Prize in 1982, and the Dobloug Prize in 1991.

== Selected works ==
- 1970 Sentrifuge
- 1973 Med solbriller i tunnelen
- 1974 Froskemannskoret
- 1975 Versjoner i feberpels
- 1976 Barbeinte skyskrapere
- 1977 Koden til muskelskapet
- 1978 Hamrende vaffelhjerter
- 1979 Huset gråt mye som barn
- 1980 Trafikklys for elver
- 1981 I vingenes fotspor
- 1983 Vokt Dem for huden
- 1984 Duften av kompassroser
- 1988 Det nedbrente luftslott
- 1990 Til deg som søv burt dine draumar
- 1991 Vindblomster fra den innerste esken
- 1992 Hvit hegre over silkeveien
- 1993 Som sunket i orda
- 1994 Dannebrog i mitt langbente hjerte
- 1996 Mellom barken og verden
- 1998 Hodet er den eneste trekronen som vokser inn i himmelen
- 2003 Å skjøte en regnbue
- 2005 Skriften bak speilet
- 2006 Slik trær føder barn
- 2007 Jeg kan høre din hånd synge
- 2008 Sirkus for usynlige elefanter
