= Birgitte Cathrine Boye =

Danish hymnwriter

Birgitte Cathrine Boye (March 7, 1742 – October 17, 1824) was a Danish hymnwriter.

== Early life ==
Birgitte Cathrine Boye was born in Gentofte, Denmark as the oldest child of the royal hunting official Jens Johannissen and his wife Dorthe Henriksdatter. At the age of 13, she fell in love with the forest manager Herman Michelsen Herz, whom she married in 1763. In the course of five years, she had four children, but nonetheless studied German, French, and English on her own so that she could read literature in these languages.

== Hymnwriter ==
In 1773, she delivered 20 hymns in response to an announcement, and they were well received. In the mid-1700s, Pietism had suffered a strong setback in Denmark, which also had an effect on hymnwriting, and lofty poetry came into fashion instead. Ludvig Harboe and Ove Høegh-Guldberg were commissioned to write a new hymnal, and in January 1778 they produced the draft for Psalme-Bog eller En Samling af gamle og nye Psalmer (Hymnal or A Collection of Old and New Hymns), known as Guldberg's hymnal. This hymnal contained 132 hymns from Kingo's hymnal and 143 from Erik Pontoppidan's hymnal. A full 146 of the hymns were written by Birgitte Cathrine Boye, who made her mark on the new Danish hymnal in this way.

She was said to have had "en besynderlig gave til denne hellige poesi" (a peculiar gift for sacred poetry). Birgitte Cathrine Boye wrote her hymns during a turbulent time in her life: her husband died in 1775, and in 1778 she married again, to the customs inspector and judicial adviser Hans Boye.

The hymnal was subject to much criticism, and this criticism was also directed at Boye and her hymns. Many found her hymns to be rather pompous. She accepted the criticism, and declined in 1790 when she was asked to provide hymns for a new hymnal. However, some of her hymns live on, and she became known a female composer of pulpit hymns. Her pulpit hymns are still sung on festival days in many Nordic countries. She is represented in the 1985 Norwegian hymnal with one translated hymn and three pulpit hymns published in both Bokmål and Nynorsk.

Birgitte Cathrine Boye also wrote a number of plays, including Melicerte (1780) and Gorm den gamle, et heroisk Sørgespil (Gorm the Old: A Heroic Tragedy, 1781).

== 1985 and 2013 Norwegian hymnals ==
The Church of Norway's 1985 hymnal and 2013 hymnal contain three hymns by Boye, translated by Elias Blix.

- No. 47/48 "En frelser er oss født i dag" / "I dag er fødd ein frelsar stor" (A Savior Is Born Today)
- No. 177/178 "Han er oppstanden, store bud" / "Han er oppstaden dyre ord"
- No. 215/216 "O lue fra Guds kjærlighet" / "Du loge av Guds kjærleikseld" (Oh Flame of God's Love)

In addition, she also translated hymn no. 661 "Jeg er frelst og dyrekjøpt" ('I am saved and redeemed'; originally "Ich bin getauft auf deinen Namen" 'I Am Baptized in Thy Name', written in 1735 by the German Pietist poet Johann Jakob Rambach, 1693–1735).
