= Nokre salmar =

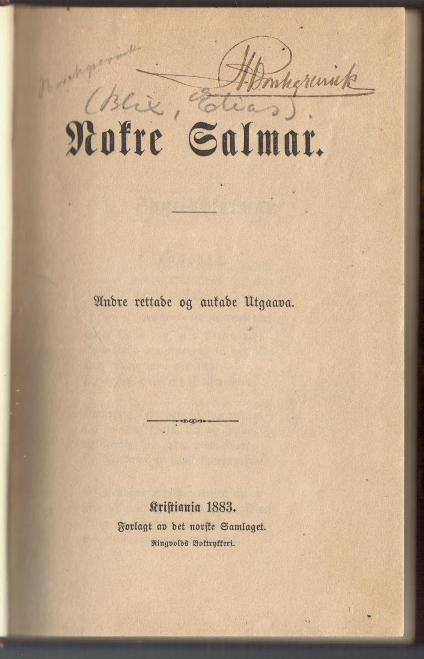
Nokre salmar appeared in several editions, initially anonymously

Nokre salmar (Some Hymns) was the first Nynorsk hymnal. It was published anonymously by Elias Blix. The volume was first issued as smaller booklets, with the first in 1869, and then in 1870 and 1875, and then in an expanded version in 1883 published by Det Norske Samlaget. On March 4, 1892 Nokre Salmar was authorized for use in public worship, and these Landsmål hymns were then incorporated into Landstad's hymnal as nos. 635 to 791.

In 1908, the Liturgical Readings and Agenda for the Church of Norway (Tekstbok og altarbok for den norske kyrkja) in Peter Hognestad's translation was authorized for public use. In addition, the litany and pulpit hymns were also authorized, and in later editions these were added in what was known as the "Blix Supplement" as nos. 785 to 791.

The first churches to adopt Blix's hymnal were Ranem Church and Skage Church in the parish of Namdal in Overhalla Municipality in 1892. By 1901, 76 parishes had done so, and this number grew to 266 by 1914 and to over 500 by 1926. In many places there were disagreements about the Blix Supplement. An 1892 resolution created a basis for many parishes to not use the Blix Supplement. In 1926, a royal resolution was adopted that those using Hauge's and Landstad's hymnals should also use the hymns in Nokre salmar. However, by that time Landstad's revised hymnal and the Nynorsk hymnal had already been adopted.

== Early editions ==
- Booklet I was published in 1869 and contained 13 hymns, of which four were newly written and nine were translated.
- Booklet II was published in 1870 and contained 27 hymns, of which 10 were newly written and 17 were translated.
- Booklet III was published in 1875 and contained 17 hymns, of which 14 were newly written and three were translated.

The second edition was published in 1883 and contained 68 hymns, of which 39 were newly written and 29 were translated.

The third edition was issued in Bergen in 1887 and had the same contents as the second edition, the only difference being that it was printed in an Antiqua typeface instead of Fraktur.

The fourth and fifth editions, which were authorized for church use in 1892, contained 150 hymns. The books were also printed as a supplement to Landstad's hymnal containing 157 hymns; the last seven of these were the litany and pulpit hymns.
