= Matthäus Apelles von Löwenstern =

German psalmist, musician and statesman

- Born: Matthäus Apelt; 20 April 1594; Prudnik
- Died: 11 April 1648 (aged 53); Breslau
- Resting place: St. Mary Magdalene Church, Wrocław
- Occupations: Psalmist; Musician; Statesman
- Spouse: Barbara von Tarnau und Kühschmal (m. 1637)

Matthäus Apelles von Löwenstern (20 April 1594 – 11 April 1648) was a German psalmist, musician and statesman.

== Life ==
He was born in Prudnik as Matthäus Apelt. His father was a saddler. He studied at the university of Frankfurt. He directed the music of the church at Prudnik. In 1625, he was named musical director and treasurer to Duke Heinrich Wenzel of Münsterberg. The following year, he became rector of a school, and in 1631, he was admitted to the Duke's government. He sat in the governments of Emperors Ferdinand II and Ferdinand III. He became part of the nobility of Ferdinand II, and this was confirmed by Ferdinand III.

Löwenstern wrote thirty psalms, of which many were translated to other languages. He also published the psalm collection Früelings-Mayen in 1644. He has one psalm in the Norsk Salmebok and Norsk salmebok 2013.

== See also ==
- Lord of Our Life and God of Our Salvation
- For the Lord reigneth

== Literature ==
- Anne Kristin Aasmundtveit, Biografisk leksikon til Norsk Salmebok og Norsk Koralbok, Verbum forlag, Oslo, 1995. ISBN 82-543-0573-0. Side 38-39.
- Peter Ján Martinček, The Life and Works of Matthäus Apelles von Löwenstern (1594–1648), Bd. 1: Catalogue of Compositions, Stimul, Bratislava 2023. ISBN 978-80-8127-383-4 (online).
