= Anna Jacobsen =

Norwegian Southern Sami writer and translator (1924–2004)

Anna Jacobsen (Southern Sami: Jaahkenelkien Aanna; 30 October 1924 – 2 April 2004) was a champion of Southern Sami language and culture in Norway. She started her own publishing company and was a recipient of the King's Medal of Merit.

== Biography ==
Anna Johanna Jacobsen was born in Kappfjell, 30 October 1924. Her southern Sami family was involved with reindeer herding, and her father was a pioneer in organizing the Sami community. At home, the family spoke southern Sami, and she did not learn Norwegian until she started at the Sami school in Havika outside Namsos in the late 1930s. Her interest in the South Sami language was aroused while attending school. When she took the examen artium at an early age, she had Southern Sami as a second language instead of Nynorsk. Jacobsen went on to study Northern Sami, German and South Sami at the university level, and became the first to be examined in South Sami.

At her home in Majavatn, Jacobsen organized a language group to grow the Sami language. The participants were only allowed to speak Sami. She also taught Sami in several schools. In the 1970s, she was active in preserving the Sami school in Hattfjelldal, and she was also the spokeswoman for an action to create a Sami cultural center in the village, known later as Sijti Jarnge. She was also active in the work to start a Southern Sami theater. Jacobsen was a language consultant for the Sami Education Council from 1987 to 1991, and worked actively on publishing dictionaries.

For several years, she was responsible for South Sami at NRK. The children's book, Åvla (2013), is based on fairy tales she told in NRK Sápmi. Interviews and other audio recordings of Jacobsen are published by the National Archives of Norway.

Jacobsen started her own publishing company where she published several texts. Together with Bierna Bientie, she translated the Gospel of St. Mark into Southern Sami. This was published by the Norwegian Bible Society in 1993 under the title, Jupmelen rijhke lea castskes (Kingdom of God is near). In Salmer 1997, there are four texts, which she translated into Southern Sami, and in Norsk salmebok 2013, she has four translations and a distinctive text.

Jacobsen died 2 April 2004.

== Awards and honors ==
- King's Medal of Merit in silver
- Nordland fylkes kulturpris
- Hattfjelldal Municipality culture prize
- Bibelprisen
- Honorary lecturer at Nesna University College
