= Liturgical reform in the Church of Norway =

The Liturgical Reform in the Church of Norway came into effect for the Church of Norway on the first Sunday of Advent in 2011, which is the first Sunday in the liturgical year. The reform constituted changes to the mass in both structure and content, and the name of the Sunday worship service is no longer referred to as høymesse 'high mass', but hovedgudstjeneste 'main worship service'. The main worship service also allows for greater local variation regarding the service's arrangement and content. The 2011 Church of Norway Service Book replaced the Church of Norway Service Book, which was adopted for use in the Church of Norway on October 26, 1990, in line with Paragraph 16 of the Constitution. In addition to a new service book with a new liturgy for the main worship service, the reform included issuing a new baptismal liturgy, a new book with Sunday readings and sermon texts, books with new liturgical music, and new legislative decrees about the service. A new hymnal, which replaces both the 1985 hymnal and the 1997 hymnal, was adopted by the Church of Norway General Synod on April 17, 2012. The 2013 hymnal was issued in November 2013 for the first Sunday of Advent.
