= Jacob Børretzen =

Jacob Børretzen (August 30, 1900 – November 17, 1989) was a Norwegian hymnwriter and linguist.

Børretzen was born in Enge in Etne Municipality, Hordaland County, Norway, the son of Vilhelm Severin Børretzen and Sigrid Børretzen. He was the secretary of Norwegian Sami Mission (Norwegian: Norges Finnemisjonsselskap, since 1966 the Norges Samemisjon) and a member of the hymnal commission for the Sami hymnal Gir'ko-sál'bmagirji, which was published in 1957. He translated hymns into Sami, and is represented by a hymn he translated in the 1985 Norwegian hymnal and its supplement Salmer 1997 (1997 Hymns). He also published the volume Liten samisk grammatikk (Little Sami Grammar) in 1966.

His son was the author, illustrator, and translator Odd Børretzen.
