= 1779 in Denmark =

- Decades: 1750s; 1760s; 1770s; 1780s; 1790s
- See also: Other events of 1779; List of years in Denmark

Events from the year 1779 in Denmark.

== Incumbents ==
- Monarch – Christian VII
- Prime minister – Ove Høegh-Guldberg

== Culture ==
=== Music ===
- Johann Hartmann's music for Johannes Ewald's opera The Death of Vader (premiered 1778) is used for the first time.

== Births ==
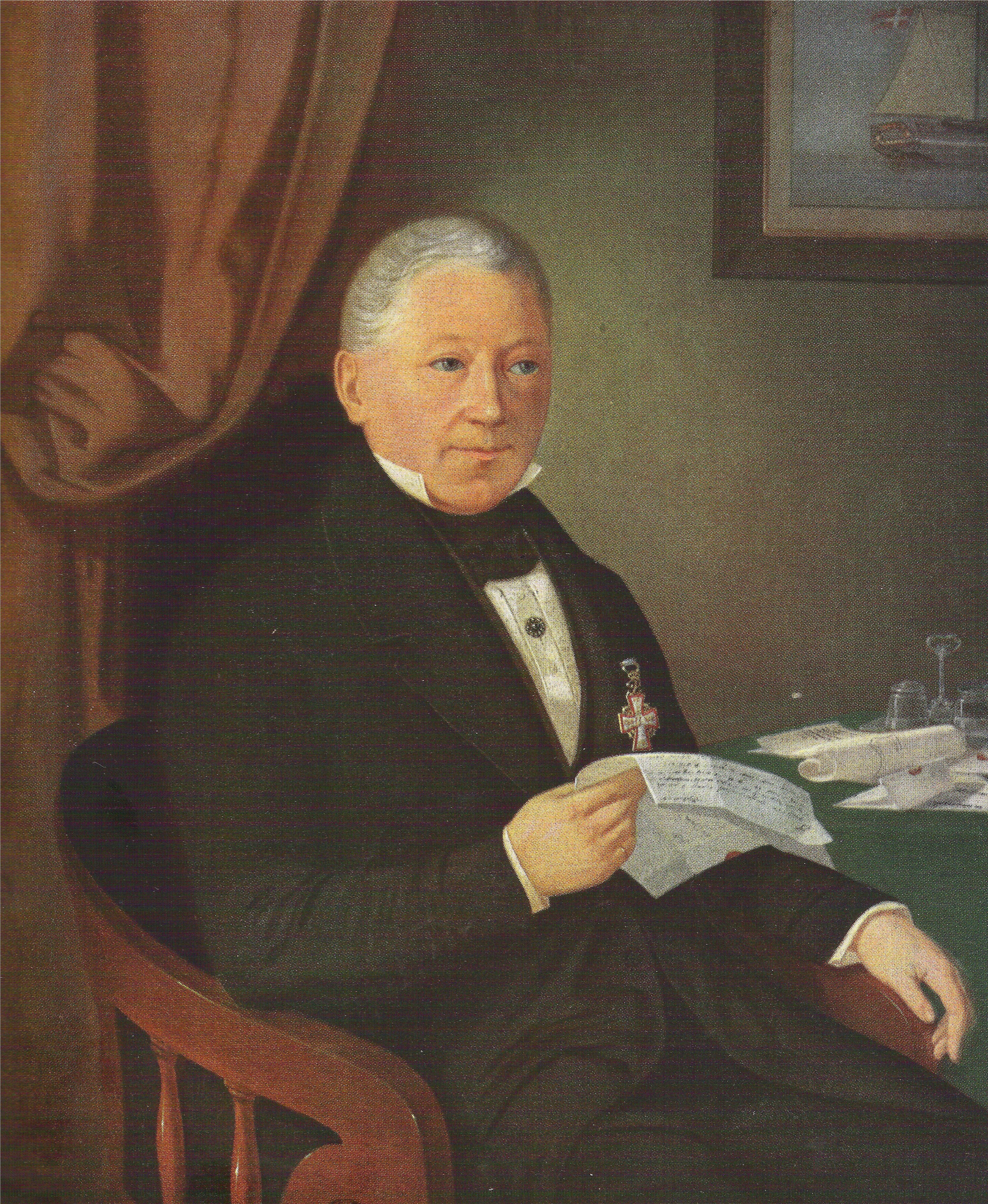
Hacob Holm.

- 7 March — Conrad Christian Bøhndel, painter and lithographer (died 1847)
- 3 April– Julius Høegh-Guldberg, military officer (died 1751)
- 4 April – Julius Høegh-Guldberg, officer and politician (died 1861)
- 3 August – Peter Atke Castberg, physician (died 1823)
- 25 August – Andreas Schifter (died 1852)
- 14 November – Adam Oehlenschläger, poet (died 1850)

== Deaths ==
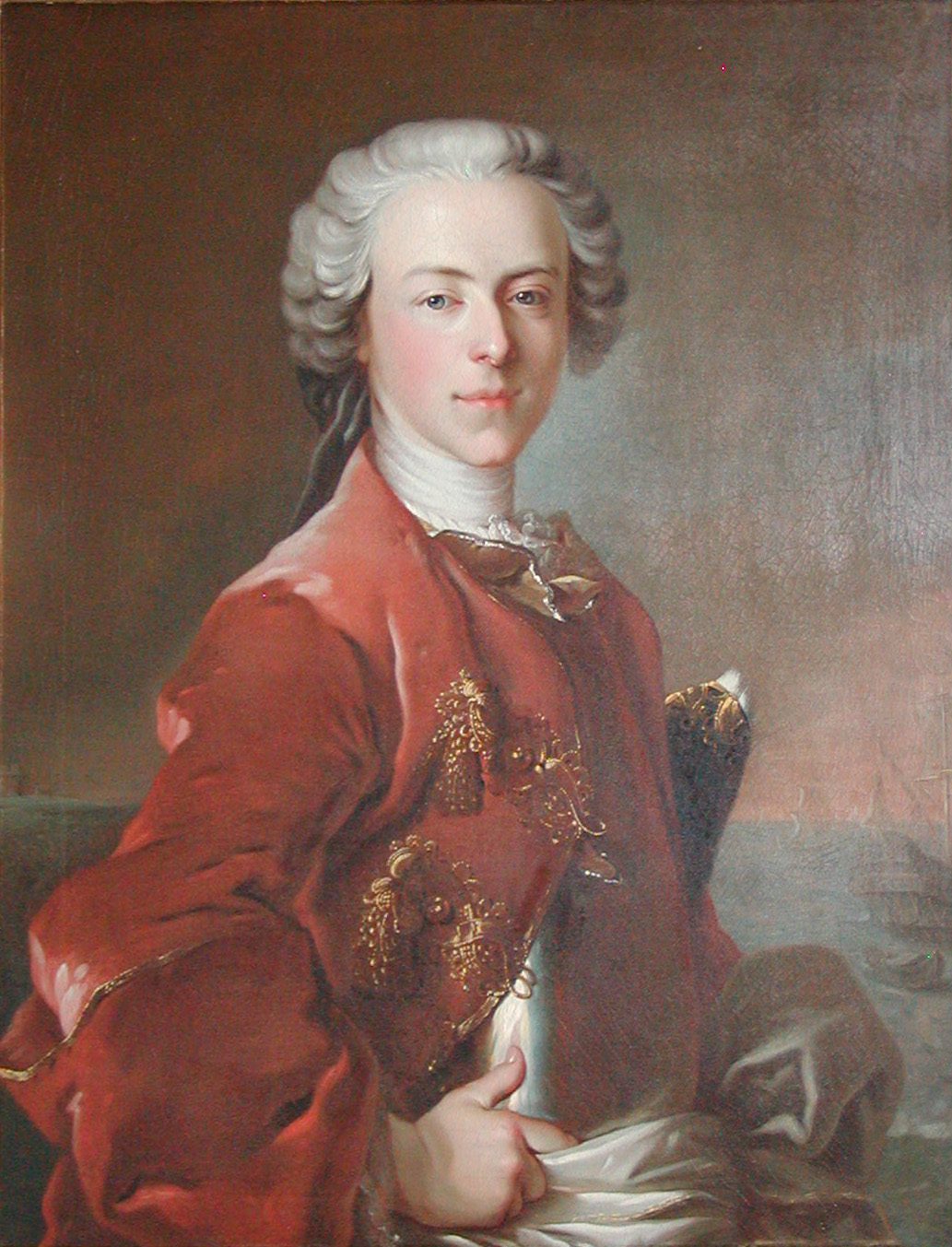
Frederik de Løvenørn.

- 30 September – Johan Christian Conradi, German-Danish master builder and architect (born 1709)
- 28 September – Frederik Oertz, county governor and court official (born 1712)
- 15 October – Frederik de Løvenørn, county governor (born 1715)
