= Gustav Jensen =

Norwegian priest, hymnologist, hymnwriter, and liturgist (1845-1922)

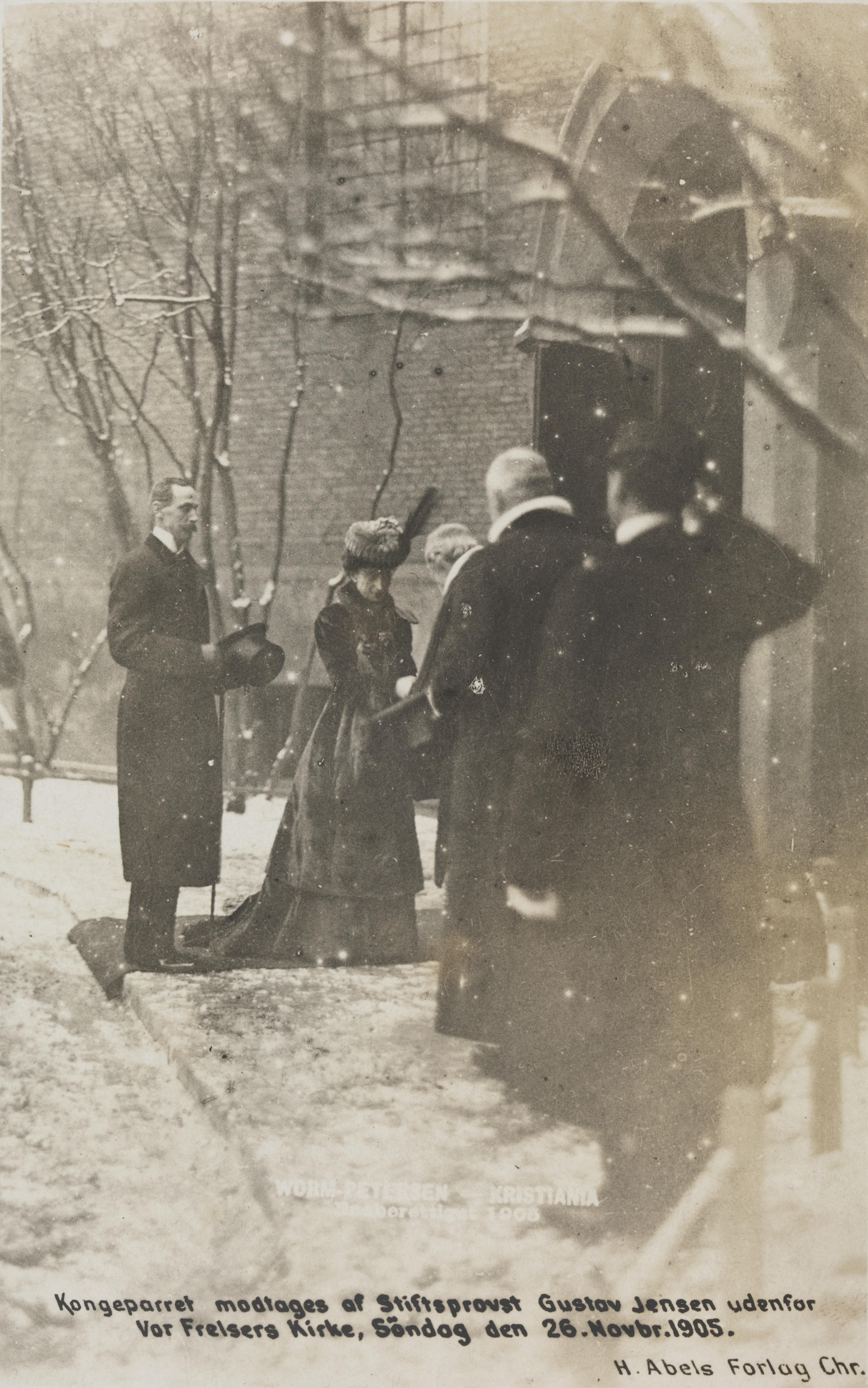
King Haakon, Queen Maud, and Gustav Jensen at the Oslo Cathedral on November 26, 1905.

Gustav Margerth Jensen (July 13, 1845 – November 2, 1922) was a Norwegian priest, hymnologist, hymnwriter, seminary instructor, and liturgist. He is best known for his liturgy revision and hymnal publication.

Gustav Jensen was born in Drammen, but he first started attending school in Arendal. He received his theology degree (cand.theol.) in 1868 and started teaching in Skoger. In 1874 he was appointed a curate at Old Aker Church. One year later he was engaged as a head instructor at the Practical Theological Seminary, where he taught liturgical studies, sermon instruction, and pastoral theology. In 1889 he became the priest at Trinity Church in Oslo, and then in 1895 he returned to his position as head instructor at the Practical Theological Seminary. In 1902 he was appointed diocesan provost at Our Savior's Church in Kristiania (currently the Oslo Cathedral).

Jensen stopped serving as diocesan provost in 1911 in order to use all of his time to work on revising Landstads kirkesalmebog (Landstad's Church Hymnal), for which he had been commissioned by a royal resolution in 1908. In 1915 he delivered his Forslag til en revideret Salmebok for den norske kirke (Proposals for a Revised Hymnal for the Church of Norway), a draft version that generated much controversy. Jensen died in 1922, before the hymnal was approved and issued. The hymnal was finally approved in 1924 and was known as Landstads reviderte salmebok (Landstad's Revised Hymnal).

== Hymns ==
Eight of the hymns in Norsk Salmebok were written by Gustav Jensen. Many of these take their themes from Biblical texts.

- 20: Konge er du visst (Thou Art Certainly a King; John 18:33–37)
- 21: Herre, du Herre, skal vokse (Lord, Thou Lord, Shalt Increase; John 3:30)
- 66: Gud sin egen Sønn oss gav (God Gave Us His Only Son)
- 205: Herre, jeg ser på bergets topp (Lord, I See the Mountaintop; Luke 24:50–53)
- 227: Det skal ei skje ved kraft og makt (It Shall Never Happen by Might and Power; Zechariah 4:6)
- 450: Be for oss, o Krist (Pray for Us, O Christ; John 17:9–17)
- 681: Ei for å tjenes Herren kom (The Lord Came Not to Be Served)
- 704: Løst fra gamle trelldoms bånd (Freed from the Old Bonds of Captivity)

He also reworked or translated twelve hymns, including Herre Gud, ditt dyre navn og ære (Good Lord, Thy Precious Name and Glory) by Petter Dass and O, bli hos meg (Abide with Me), Nærmere deg min Gud (Nearer, My God, to Thee), and Hellig, hellig, hellig (Holy, Holy, Holy) from English.

One of Jensen's hymns also appears in the Catholic hymnal Lov Herren (Praise the Lord), as well as six of his translations. The hymnal Norsk salmebok 2013 contains four of his compositions and eight of his translations.
