= Wildenvey =

Wildenvey is a surname. Notable people with the surname include:

- Gisken Wildenvey (1892–1985), Norwegian novelist and author of short stories
- Herman Wildenvey (1885–1959), Norwegian poet
