= Torvund =

Torvund is a surname. Notable people with the surname include:

- Alexander Torvund (born 2000), Hungarian footballer
- Gunnar Torvund (1948–2019) was a Norwegian sculptor
- Helge Torvund (born 1951), Norwegian psychologist, poet, essayist, literary critic and children's writer
- Øyvind Torvund (born 1976), Norwegian composer
