= Listed buildings in Viborg Municipality =

This is a list of listed buildings in Viborg Municipality, Denmark.

Note: This list is incomplete. A complete list og listed buildings in Vordingborg Municipality can be found on Danish Wikipedia.

== The list ==
Listing name	Contributing resource	Image	Location	Year built	source
2. Generalkommando			Sct. Mathias Gade 96B, 8800 Viborg	1913	Ref
Hald Manor	3		Ravnsbjergvej 76, 8800 Viborg		Ref
Morville House	1		Sct. Mogens Gade 8, 8800 Viborg	1798	791-70716-1
Viborg Cathedral School	1		Gl. Skivevej 2, 8800 Viborg	1926	791-91012-1
