= Schøien =

Schøien is a Norwegian surname. Notable people with the surname include:

- Alexia Bryn (also credited as Schøien and Bryn-Schøien; 1889–1983), Norwegian pair skater
- Kristin Solli Schøien (born 1954), Norwegian author and composer
