= Fagbokforlaget =

Norwegian academic publisher

- Parent company: Forlagshuset Vigmostad & Bjørke
- Founded: 1992
- Country of origin: Norway
- Headquarters location: Bergen
- Publication types: Books
- Official website: www.fagbokforlaget.no

Fagbokforlaget (literally, 'the textbook press') is a Norwegian publishing company that publishes nonfiction works and teaching aids for instruction at various levels: preschool, primary school, secondary school, adult education, and higher education. Fagbokforlaget is headquartered in Bergen and has branch offices in Oslo, Trondheim, and Sopot.

Fagbokforlaget was founded in 1992, and it initially published exam questions and was named Eksamensforlaget (literally, 'the examination press'). The company had an annual turnover of c. NOK 185 million in 2014. Fagbokforlaget is part of Forlagshuset Vigmostad & Bjørke (Vigmostad & Bjørke Publishers), started and owned by Arno Vigmostad and Arnstein Bjørke. The publisher also includes the label Vigmostad & Bjørke, which publishes general-interest books, including Norwegian and translated fiction and detective stories, and Eide Forlag (Eide Press), whose publications include illustrated works, corporate and organizational histories, and hymnals for the new liturgy introduced in 2011.
