= Emmerik Høegh-Guldberg =

Danish painter

Emmerik Lucian Høegh-Guldberg
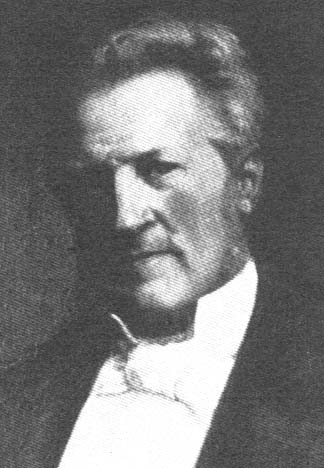
- Emmerik Lucian Høegh-Guldberg c. 1870
- Born: 4 May 1807; Aarhus, Denmark
- Died: 31 May 1881 (aged 74); Aarhus, Denmark
- Education: Royal Academy of Fine Arts
- Known for: Painting

Emmerik Lucian Høegh-Guldberg (4 May 1807 – 31 May 1881) was a Danish painter who was born in Aarhus to Julius Høegh-Guldberg, a military officer and politician, and his wife Margrethe Pallene Hahn. His half-brother was the politician Christopher Julius Høgh-Guldberg and his grandfather was Ove Høegh-Guldberg. Høegh-Guldberg was awarded the Order of the Dannebrog in 1853 and was made a Knight of the Dannebrog in 1874. ARoS Art Museum contains one painting of Emmerik Høegh-Guldberg painted by his friend Christen Købke.

== Education ==
Emmerik Høegh-Guldberg was the child of Julius Høegh-Guldberg and Margrethe Pallene Hahn who lived in Aarhus. Emmerik was originally supposed to have a military career like his father and he became a military cadet in 1819 to 1826. However, in 1828 he went to Copenhagen where he was admitted to the Royal Danish Academy of Fine Arts. He studied painting under Christian August Lorentzen and later graduated from the plaster school in July 1828. Like Lorentzen he mostly worked with animal painting but also did etchings on metal.

== Work ==
In 1829 he came back to Aarhus and got a job teaching writing and calculus at Aarhus Cathedral School. In 1859 he became adjunct professor at the Cathedral School and he kept working there until 1879. While working at the Cathedral School he was also principal of Prins Frederik Ferdinands Tegneskole, which would later become Aarhus Tech. In 1840 he helped organize an art exhibition in Aarhus which later became Aarhus Museum. Høegh-Guldberg exhibited at the Charlottenborg Spring Exhibition in 1833-38, 1852 and 1855.

== Private life ==
In 1834, Emmerik Høegh-Guldberg co-founded Aarhus Borgerlige Skydeselskab (Aarhus Shooting Society) which his father and brother also became members of. In 1836, he married Vilhelmine Therese Gebauer, the daughter of Christian David Gebauer. Christian Gebauer was Høegh-Guldbergs teacher and mentor while he studied at the Academy of Fine Arts in Copenhagen. Vilhelmine Therese Gebaurer died the year after in 1837 and in 1843 he married again, this time to Jacobine Mathilde Raae, the daughter of the merchant Peter Christian Raae. The couple had 5 children: Carl Ove Høegh-Guldberg, Margrethe Frederikke Wilhelmine Høegh-Guldberg, Emma Nora Høegh-Guldberg, Petra Høegh-Guldberg and Julie Hanne Mathilde Høegh-Guldberg.

== Paintings ==
"Udsigt over Aarhus" (1836)

Bjørnejagt (by sketch of Gebauer, 1833, National Gallery of Denmark); En brølende tyr (exh. 1833); En ædende ko (exh. 1833); Udsigt over Århus fra en i nærheden liggende klint (exh. 1836); Kvægmarked (exh. 1838); En forpost (exh. 1852); Jysk hornkvæg (exh. 1855).
