= Gisken =

Gisken is a Norwegian female given name. Notable people with the name include:

- Gisken Armand (born 1962), Norwegian actress
- Gisken Wildenvey (1892–1985), Norwegian author
