= Steinar Opstad =

Norwegian poet

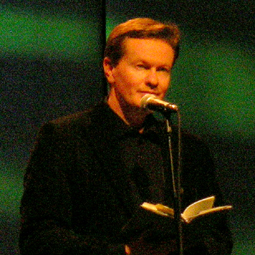
- Steinar Opstad
- Born: 28 June 1971 (age 55); Stokke, Norway
- Occupation: Poet
- Writing career
- Period: 1996–present
- Genre: Poetry
- Notable awards: Tarjei Vesaas' debutantpris (1996); Aschehoug Prize (2003); Herman Wildenvey Poetry Award (2015); Dobloug Prize (2017)

Steinar Opstad (born 28 June 1971 in Stokke) is a Norwegian poet. He made his literary debut in 1996 with the poetry collection Tavler og bud, which earned him Tarjei Vesaas' debutantpris.

He was awarded the Aschehoug Prize in 2003 and the Herman Wildenvey Poetry Award in 2015.

He was awarded the Gyldendal Prize for 2025.
