= Peter Hognestad =

Norwegian Lutheran bishop, theologian, writer and translator

The Right Reverend Peter Hognestad
- Bishop
- Church: Church of Norway
- Diocese: Diocese of Bjørgvin
- In office: 1916–1931

Personal details
- Born: 12 November 1866 Time, Norway
- Died: 1 September 1931 (aged 64) Bergen, Norway
- Denomination: Christian
- Occupation: Priest
- Education: University of Oslo (Cand.theol.)

Peter Hognestad (12 November 1866 – 1 September 1931) was a Norwegian Lutheran bishop, theologian, writer, and translator. Hognestad was from Jæren in Norway and he served as the Bishop of the Diocese of Bjørgvin from 1916 until his death in 1931.

== Early life ==
Peter Hansson Hognestad was born as a farmer's son in Time Municipality in the traditional region of Jæren in Rogaland county. He grew up in the village of Hognestad, located just south of the city of Bryne. His father was Hans Eivindsson Hognestad and his mother was Tabitha Pedersdotter Herikstad. He passed matriculation in 1886 and was graduated with a Cand.theol. degree in 1891 from the University of Oslo. In 1895, he was awarded the Crown Prince's Gold Medal (Kronprinsens gullmedalje) issued by the University of Oslo for his research work linked to the Old Testament. Also in 1895, he married Gabrielle ("Ella") Dorthea Aasland (5 March 1872 – 18 December 1945).

== Career ==
After graduation in 1891, he spent 3 years working as a teaching assistant in the theology department at the University of Oslo. From 1896 to 1903, he taught at a teacher's school in Notodden in Telemark county. Then in 1903, he began a new job as a chaplain for the Diocese of Oslo. He continued in that job until 1908 when he took a job as the Professor of the Old Testament at the MF Norwegian School of Theology. In 1916, Hognestad was appointed as Bishop of the Diocese of Bjørgvin.

During his time as Bishop, he translated biblical texts into Nynorsk, and was chief editor of the Nynorsk translation of the Bible starting in 1921. In 1925, he was co-editor of the hymnal Nynorsk salmebok together with Bernt Støylen and Anders Hovden.

Hognestad served as Bishop of Bjørgvin from 1916 until he died on 1 September 1931 in Bergen.

== Selected works ==
- Tekstbok og altarbok for Den norske kyrkja (1908)
- Meiningar om Jesus (1907)
- Det gamle testamentet og bibelsoga (1912)
- Daapskristendom og vekkjingskristendom (1918)
- Hovudredaktør for Studentmållagsbibelen (1921)
- Kyrkja er mor (1925)
- Nynorsk salmebok (1925)
- Olsok; med minne og maning (1930)
- Gud styrer (1931)
- Kvila i Gud (1933)

Church of Norway titles
| Preceded by Johan Willoch Erichsen | Bishop of Bjørgvin; 1916–1931 | Succeeded by Andreas Fleischer |
