= Guldberg's hymnal =

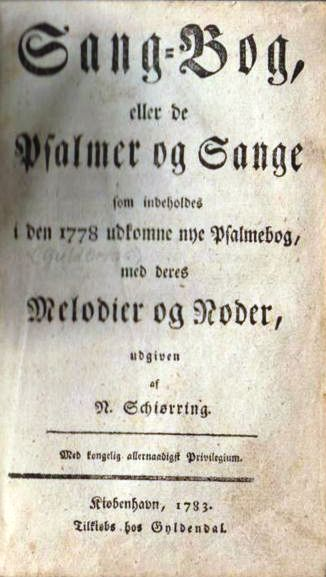
Guldberg's hymnal; Niels Schiørring's 1783 edition containing music to accompany the lyrics

Guldberg's hymnal (published as Psalme-Bog eller En Samling af gamle og nye Psalmer 'Hymnal or A Collection of Old and New Hymns') is a hymnal that was created by Bishop Ludvig Harboe and Ove Høegh-Guldberg and was authorized for use in 1778.

== Background ==
On behalf of King Christian VII of Denmark, Denmark's de facto prime minister, Ove Høegh-Guldberg, appointed a two-person committee, consisting of himself and the bishop of Zealand, Ludvig Harboe, to prepare a new hymnal. They sought to modernize Kingo's hymnal, primarily by removing the hymns that lacked the requisite "correctness, dignity, and strength" or whose poetic quality was too weak. To replace the hymns that would be removed from the authorized hymnal, Birgitte Cathrine Boye received royal funding to write and translate hymns.

== Content ==
The hymnal contains 438 hymns taken from various sources:

- 32 from Thomissøn's hymnal
- 101 from Kingo's hymnal
- 144 from Erik Pontoppidan's hymnal
- 161 new hymns, of which 24 were from Germany, 133 from Denmark, and two from Norway.

Birgitte Cathrine Boye wrote 124 of the 133 new Danish hymns in the volume. The two Norwegian hymns were written by Johan Vibe. Boye also translated some hymns, so overall 146 hymns, or one-third of those in the volume, can be credited to her.

== Editions and authorization ==
The book is arranged following the liturgical year, with hymns designated for each Sunday and hymns for other church events. The book also contains some morning and evening hymns, and at the end 38 hymns with the Passion of Jesus as their theme.

Guldberg's hymnal introduced some Pietist hymns from Pontoppidan's hymnal into use in Norwegian churches. When Niels Schiørring's book of melodies was added to Guldberg's hymnal, some new hymn melodies came into use.

The hymnal was issued for the first time in 1778 and was printed in new editions in the following years. It was authorized for use and adopted in Copenhagen in 1781 and in other towns in 1783; however, the powerful prime minister Guldberg was then forced to resign, and the introduction of the hymnal in rural areas was postponed. The book later came into more widespread use in Norway than in Denmark and, when Norway received its own assembly in 1814, the book was one of the three authorized hymnals in Norway, alongside Kingo's hymnal and the Lutheran-Christian Hymnal.
