= Julius Høegh-Guldberg =

Julius Høgh-Guldberg
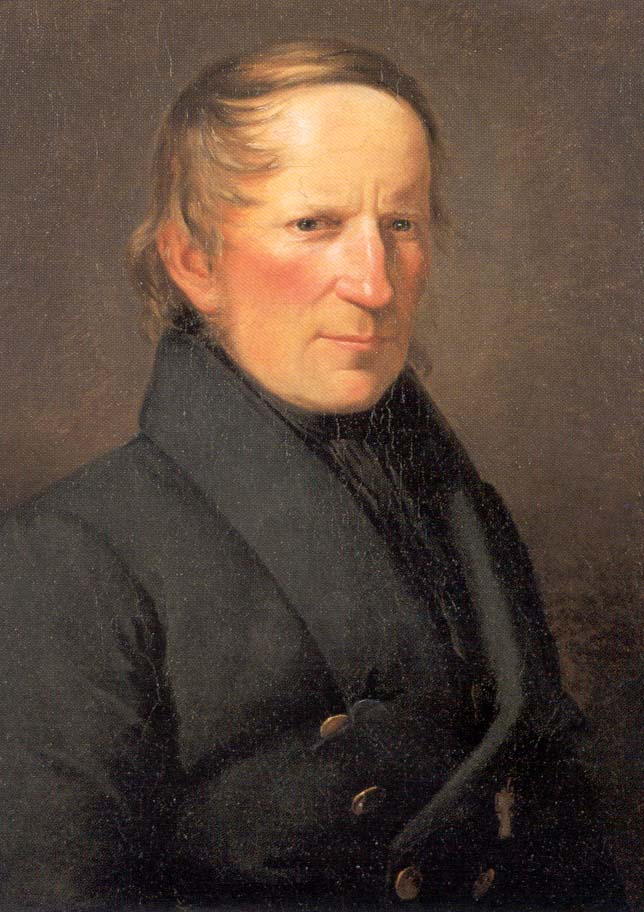
- Julius Høgh-Guldberg
- Born: 3 April 1779; Copenhagen, Denmark
- Died: 30 November 1861 (aged 82); Aarhus, Denmark

Julius Høgh-Guldberg (3 April 1779 – November 1861) was a Danish officer, commissioner and politician. He had a long and prominent military career until he retired in 1832 at the rank of colonel. He settled in Aarhus where he became a member of the city council. He was extensively involved in social issues and advocacy. He was awarded both the Order of the Dannebrog and the Knights of the Order of the Dannebrog before he died in 1861.

== Early life and family ==
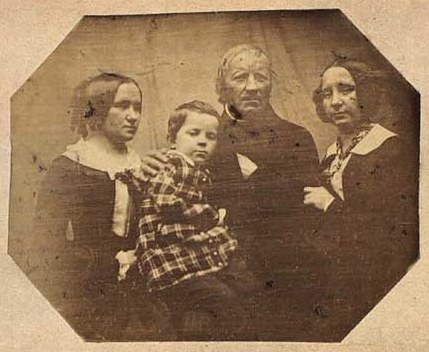
Julius Høgh-Guldberg and 3 of his children, 1850s

Høgh-Guldberg was born in Copenhagen in 1779 where he grew up with 6 siblings. His parents were prime minister Ove Høegh-Guldberg and his second wife Lucie Emmerentze Nørlem.

Høgh-Guldberg married twice, first time in 1805 to Margrethe Pallene Hahn (1782–1835) with whom he had 8 children, the second time in 1841 to Cathrine Johanne Emilie Friis (1813–1899) with whom he had a son. His last born also became his namesake, Julius Emil Høegh-Guldberg and would eventually have a prominent career as well.

== Military career ==
Høgh-Guldberg grew up in Copenhagen to wealthy, well-connected parents. In 1792 he became a second lieutenant à la suite in the Danish army, in 1794 first lieutenant à la suite in the 1. Jutland Infantry Regiment, in 1798 Captain, in 1803 her served as a staff officer and in 1806 he was given his own company. He served during the English Wars and was on 28 January 1809 awarded the Order of the Dannebrog and was in the same year promoted to major and made a battalion chief. In 1816 he was promoted to lieutenant colonel and in 1823 he was promoted to colonel and relocated to Aarhus to take charge of the forces there. 9 years later he retired from the army but remained in Aarhus.

== Politics and public service ==
He settled in Aarhus and eventually became a member of the city council from 3 January 1840 to 8 January 1852 and was a chairman of it between 1842 and 1843. On 28 January 1859 he was awarded the Knight of the Order of the Dannebrog.

In 1838 he replaced Thomas Funder as warden of the poor. In 1840 and until 1852 he was a member of the Church Inspectors for the Diocese of Aarhus. Between 1840 and 1842 and 1852 he sat on the commission for the poor. Between 1840 and 1847 he sat on the commission for billing, between 1840 and 1846 and between 1851 and 1852 he was on the commission for paving, between 1848 and 1849 he served as an auditor. From 1848 to 1849 he was on the budget commission, from 1849 to 1850 he was on the revenue commission. From 1850 to 1861 he served variously on the commissions for health, fire and safety and forests. As a city council member he also wrote summaries of city council meetings which were later published in Århus Stiftstidende, the first time information was published in that manner.

== Philanthropy ==
Høegh-Guldberg was involved in philanthropy on many levels. He personally grew and gave away fruit trees to poor worker families and attempted to breed silk worms and get others interested. In 1821 he took initiative to establishing Aarhus Stiftstbibliotek (Aarhus Parish Library) and had a reading room set aside just for technical material. Through the years he collected a large number of ancient artifacts which he later donated to the historisk-antikvariske selskab (Pre-historic society) which would later become the Pre-historic Museum. Høegh-Guldberg sat on the board of Princess Caroline's Asylum for Children and was active in Prince Ferdinand's Drawing School, the forebear to Aarhus Tech which he is considered the founder of. He was also involved in founding the credit union Spare- og Lånekassen.

In 1825 he rented a hilly, overgrown area outside the city walls by Studsgade's Port and landscaped it the year after under an agreement to plant 3000 trees on the land. This was the beginning of what would become the park of Vennelystparken, known as Guldbergs Have (Guldberg's Garden) at the time. Høegh-Guldberg sat on the committee for future use of the park in 1849 and later on the committee for the park from 1852 and 1861.

== Depictions ==
In 1829 he was painted by Christen Købke, a friend of Høegh-Guldberg's son Emmerik Høegh-Guldberg. Emmerik and two other family members was also painted by Kæbke and today all four paintings can be found in ARoS Aarhus Kunstmuseum. The Royal Danish Library has a daguerreotype of Høegh-Guldberg sitting with 3 of his children.
