= Hergisheim =

House in Stavern, Norway

Coordinates: 59°0′9.4176″N 10°2′2.9184″E

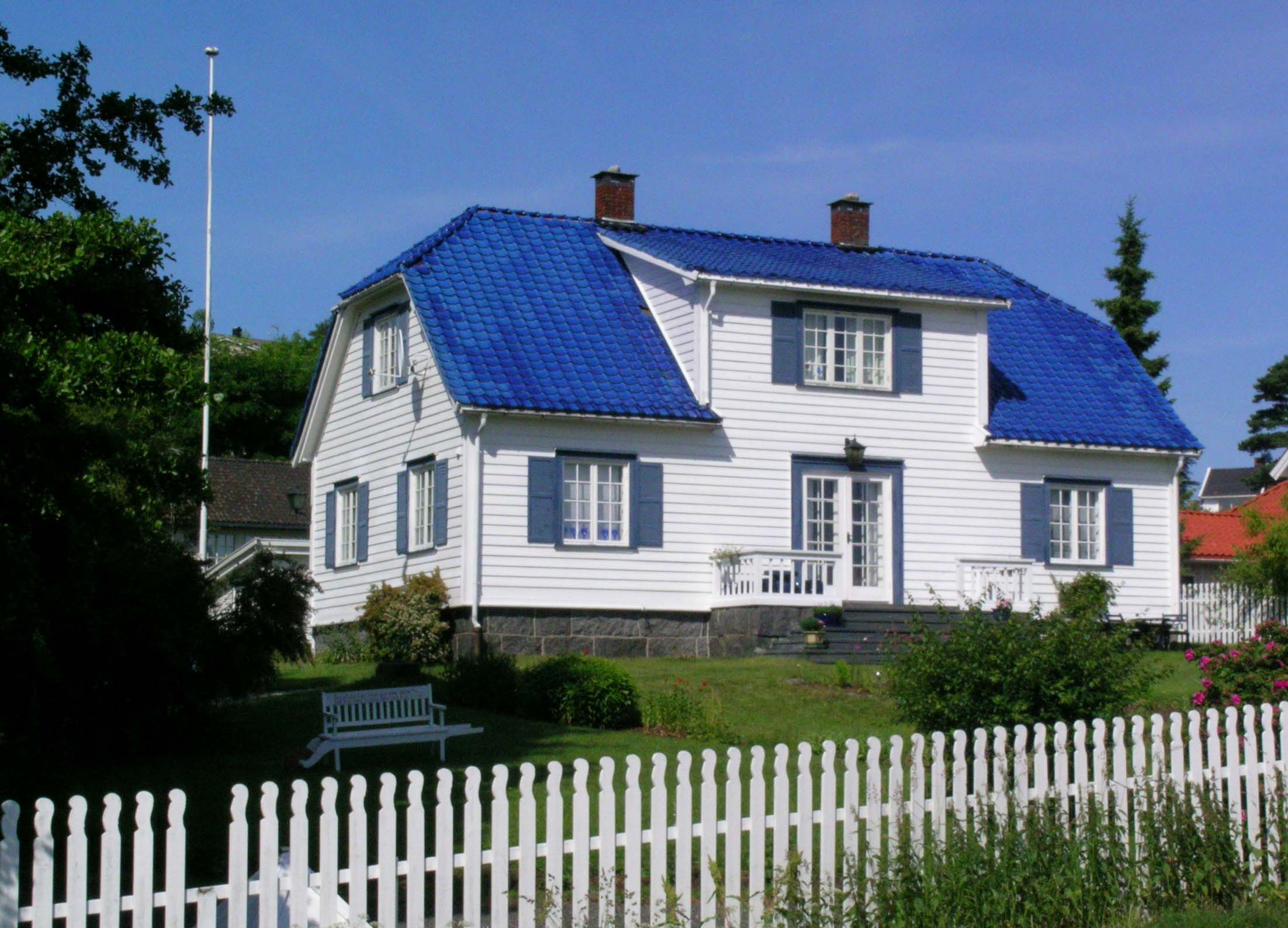
The Wildenvey home, built in 1927

Hergisheim is a house in Stavern, Norway. It is classified as an artist's home because the novelist Gisken Wildenvey (1895–1985) and her husband the poet Herman Wildenvey (1885–1959) lived in the house from 1927 onward.

The Wildenveys came to Stavern in 1923 in search of a country house. The apartment where they had lived in Copenhagen from 1913 to 1920 had burned down, and the insurance settlement served as initial capital for construction. They moved in for Christmas in 1927, having previously rented in Stavern.

The house is described in Gisken Wildenvey's memoirs Kjærlighet varer lengst (Love Lasts Longest, 1975) and in Tom Lotherington's biography of Herman Wildenvey, Wildenvey – et dikterliv (Wildenvey: A Poet's Life, 1993). The Herman Wildenvey Poetry Award is awarded annually at Hergisheim.

The name Hergisheim was created by combining the first syllables of the couple's names. The house is owned by the Wildenvey family.
