= Halvor Roll =

Norwegian poet, novelist and translator

Halvor Roll (30 March 1929 – 30 March 2008) was a Norwegian poet, novelist and translator. He was born in Trondheim. He made his literary debut in 1967 with the novel Barnekrigen. Among his poetry collections are Den gamle krokodillen from 1969, Jorden står ensom på himmelen from 1983, and Ormens tørst etter varmt regn from 1998. He received the Herman Wildenvey Poetry Award in 1998.
