= For the Lord reigneth =

German Christian hymn

- by Matthäus Apelles von Löwenstern
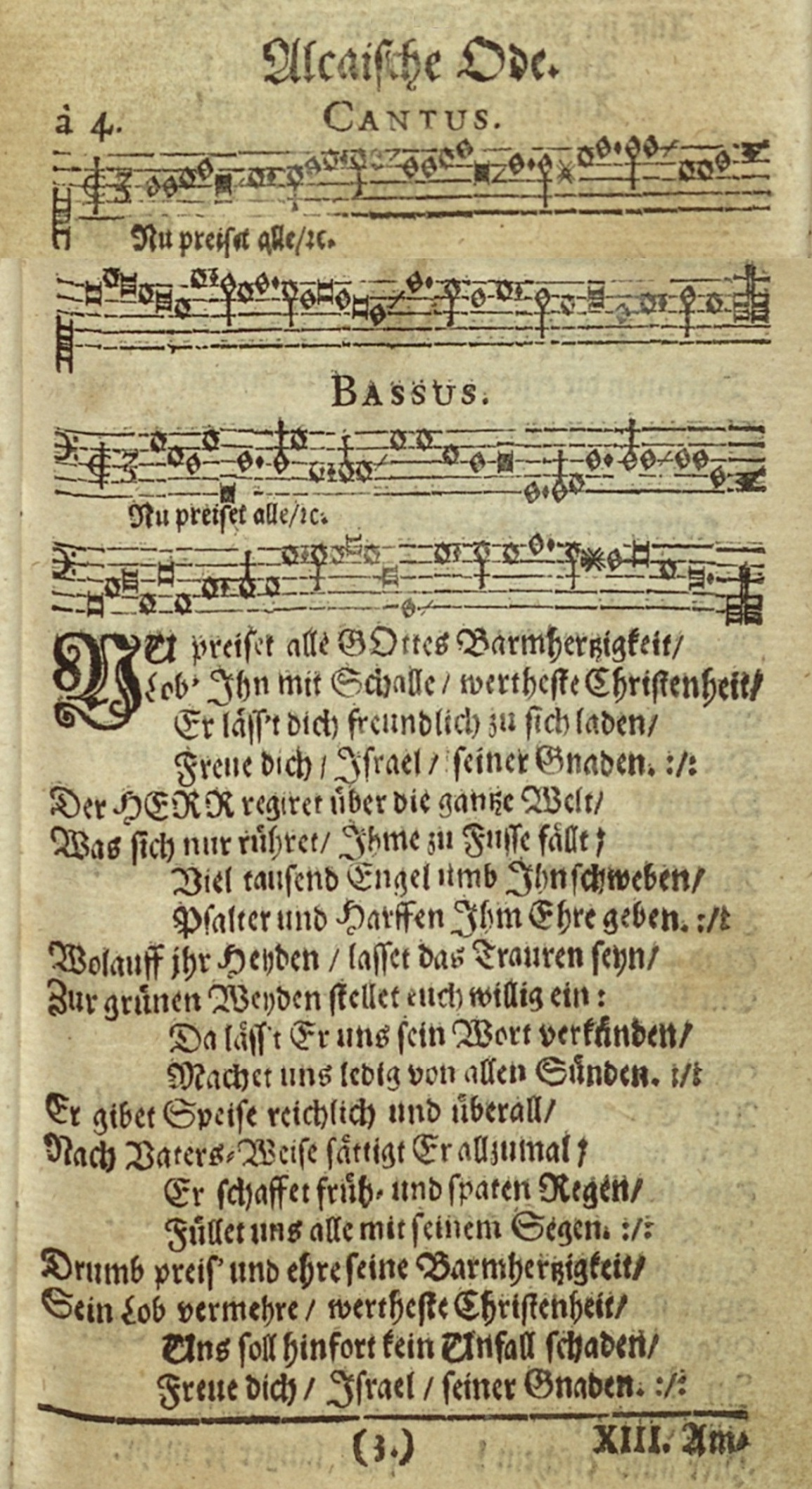
- Native name: Nun preiset alle Gottes Barmherzigleit
- Genre: hymn
- Written: 1644
- Text: Matthäus Apelles von Löwenstern, translated by Catherine Winkworth
- EG 502

"For the Lord reigneth" (German: "Nun preiset alle Gottes Barmherzigleit") is a German Christian hymn written by Matthäus Apelles von Löwenstern in 1644. It was translated into English in 1863 by Catherine Winkworth.

== Lyrics ==
Nun preiset alle Gottes Barmherzigkeit!
Lob ihn mit Schalle, werteste Christenheit!
Er lässt dich freundlich zu sich laden;
freue dich, Israel, seiner Gnaden! (Note: The last line of each verse is repeated)

Der Herr regieret über die ganze Welt;
was sich nur rühret, alles zu Fuß ihm fällt.
Viel tausend Engel um ihn schweben,
Psalter und Harfen ihm Ehre geben.

Wohlauf, ihr Heiden, lasset das Trauern sein,
zur grünen Weiden stellet euch willig ein;
da lässt er uns sein Wort verkünden,
machet uns ledig von allen Sünden.

Er gibet Speise reichlich und überall,
nach Vaters Weise sättigt er allzumal;
er schaffet frühn und späten Regen,
füllet uns alle mit seinem Segen.

Drum preis und ehre seine Barmherzigkeit;
sein Lob vermehre, werteste Christenheit!
Uns soll hinfort kein Unfall schaden;
freue dich, Israel, seiner Gnaden!

Translation:

Now let us loudly praise God, the merciful;
Christendom proudly tells of His glorious rule;
gently He bids thee come before Him,
haste then, o Israel, now adore Him! (Note: This stanza is usually sung last in English. For ease of comparison, it is here put next to the corresponding German verses.)

For the Lord reigneth over the universe,
all He sustaineth, all things His praise rehearse,
the host of angels round Him dwelling,
psalter and harp of His praise are telling.

Rise then, ye nations, cast off your mournfulness;
into His pastures will ye not gladly press?
For there His Word abroad is sounded,
pardon for sinners, and grace unbounded.

Richly he feeds us, always and everywhere;
gently He leads us with a true Father's care;
the late and early rains He sends us,
daily His blessing, His love attends Us.

Sing we His praises who is thus merciful;
Christendom raises songs to His glorious rule!
Rejoice! no foe shall now alarm us,
He will protect us, and who can harm us?
