= Odd Børretzen =

Norwegian author, illustrator and translator

Børretzen (left) in 1979

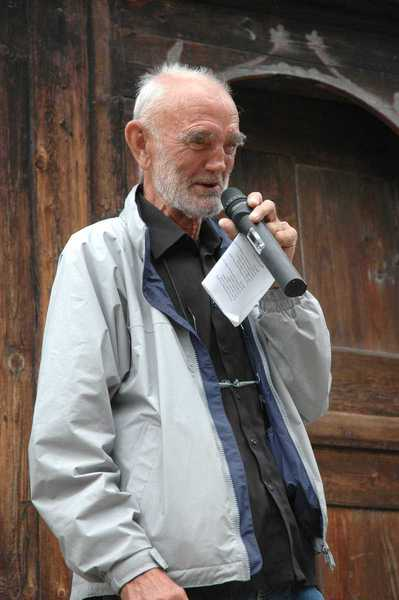
Odd Børretzen in 2005

Odd Lunde Børretzen (21 November 1926 – 3 November 2012) was a Norwegian author, illustrator, translator, and one of the most significant text writers, folk singers and artists in Norway.

== Biography ==
Børretzen was born in Fister in Fister Municipality (now part of Hjelmeland Municipality) as the son of the preacher Jacob Børretzen. When Odd was three years old, his family moved to Grorud in Oslo; his childhood is related in the self-biographic Min barndoms verden (My Childhood World, 1997; filmed as Da jeg traff Jesus … med sprettert, 2000). Later in life, between 1946 and 1952, he worked as a telegrapher among other things.

He debuted as an author in 1959 with his self-illustrated children's book Byen som laget brannbil (The city that made a firetruck). He released his first record album in 1974, and this was a product of many years of collaboration with the famous Norwegian folk singer and lyricist Alf Cranner. In 1981, he started a comprehensive cooperation with another famous Norwegian folk singer and lyricist Lars Martin Myhre, that would later have a profound impact in the musical life of Norway. Børretzen's play Synd og skam (Pity and shame) was shown on Teater Ibsen in 1994, his manuscripts always written by hand are sharp witty and always with an edge into current issues or universal everyday life.

He is well known for his many performances with Julius Hougen on radio and television as Braathen, a pensioner. They received a strong reaction to the so-called pensioner sketches, and therefore Børretzen decided to stop performing them due to bad conscience. He also was the narrator for the animation series Kalles klatretre (Kalle's Climbing Tree) on NRK.

Børretzen lived in Holmestrand. He lived with Eva Bødtker-Næss, a sculptor, for over thirty years.

== Awards ==
Odd Børretzen won the Herman Wildenvey Poetry Award in 2005. He was awarded the Leonard Statuette in 2002.
