= Anders Hovden =

Norwegian priest and writer (1860–1943)

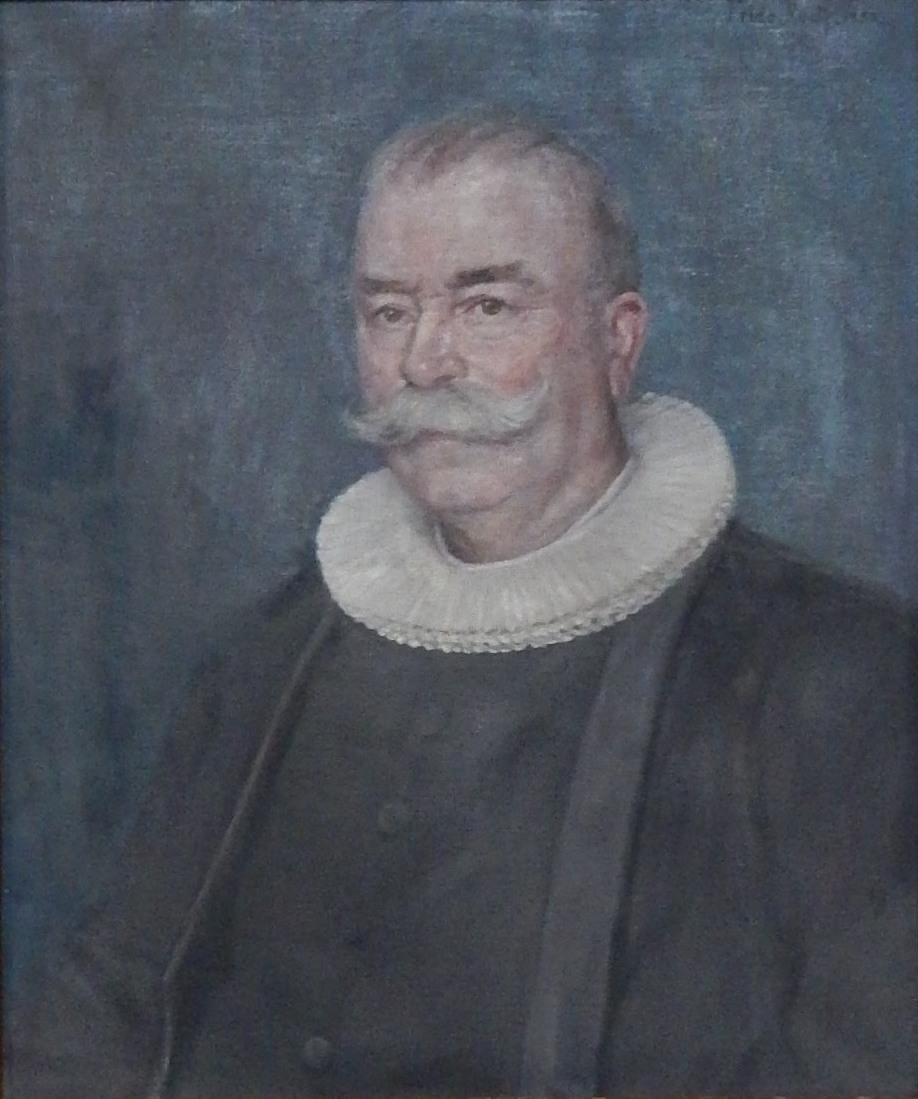
- Portrait of Anders Hovden at Hoff Church
- Born: 6 April 1860; Ørsta Municipality in Romsdalen county
- Died: 26 November 1943 (aged 83); Aker Municipality in Akershus county
- Occupations: Lutheran minister, hymnwriter, author, poet
- Spouse(s): Lina Marie Devold (1865–1895); Kari Huglen (1879–1963)

Anders Hovden (April 6, 1860 – November 26, 1943) was a Norwegian Lutheran clergyman, hymnwriter poet and author.

== Education and career ==
Anders Karlsen Hovden was born in Ørsta Municipality in Romsdalen county, Norway. His parents were Karl Rasmussen Hovden and Johanne Andersdatter Velle. His father died when he was 16, but fellow Ørsta native Ivar Aasen helped him get an education: first the teachers' training college in Volda, then examen artium at the University of Oslo. Hovden became cand.theol. in 1886 and then worked some years as a teacher. From 1891 he was a Lutheran minister in a number of different places in Norway: Lista Municipality, Son Municipality, Sande Municipality, Vanse Municipality, Krødsherad Municipality, Melhus Municipality and Østre Toten Municipality.

== Hymnwriter ==
Hovden was the author of over 250 hymns. He debuted in the mid-1890s with a couple of poetry collections, however, it was in 1897 with his third collection, Tungalda that he received popular acclaim in wider circles. His breakthrough came in 1901 with the poetry cycle Bonden. He was also on the revision board for Landstads kirkesalmebog which was the main hymnal for the Church of Norway prior to 1926. From 1928, he was co-editor the Norwegian hymnal, Nynorsk salmebok, which contained 23 original hymns by Anders Hovden and 16 translations from nynorsk. Most notable among his compositions was the Norwegian national hymn Fagert er landet ("Fair is the country"). He retired from his ministry in 1931.

== Author ==
Hovden also wrote a number of books, of which his autobiography Attersyn (1926) is best known. He also wrote Per Sivle – ei livssoge (1905), the first biography of Norwegian poet and novelist, Per Sivle. Published one year after his death, it contributed to the then obscure Sivle's increasing national popularity.

== Bibliography ==
- Sunnmøringen (1894)
- Sviv (1895)
- Heimhug (1896)
- Tungalda (1897)
- Bonden (1901)
- Per Sivle – ei livssoge (1905)
- Gate og grend (1905)
- Stormfugl (1906)
- Solhov (1907)
- Liv og lagmand (1908)
- Attersyn (1926)

== Personal life ==
Anders Hovden was married twice and was the father of ten children. His first wife Lina Marie Devold (1865–1895), died after only four years of marriage and the birth of two children. Two years later Hovden married with Kari Huglen (1879–1963). They had eight children together.
