= Herman Wildenvey Poetry Award =

Norwegian literary award

The Herman Wildenvey Poetry Award (Norwegian: Herman Wildenveys Poesipris) is a Norwegian award. It is conferred every year on July 20, the birthday of the poet Herman Wildenvey, in an event held at Hergisheim. The award consists of NOK 15,000 and a bronze relief plaque designed by the sculptor Ørnulf Bast.

The award is given to a person or institution that has helped foster interest in Herman Wildenvey's poetry and stimulated efforts for his poetic values to hold a greater place in everyday life.

The award was conferred for the first time in 1996 by the Wildenvey Society (Norwegian: Wildenvey-selskapet). After this society became defunct in 2014, the award still continued at the initiative of the former directors of the society.

== Winners ==
- 1996: Kjell Heggelund
- 1997: Torild Wardenær
- 1998: Halvor Roll
- 1999: Liv Dommersnes
- 2000: Marit Beinset Waagaard
- 2001: Kolbein Falkeid
- 2002: Annie Riis
- 2003: Aftenposten
- 2004: Benny Borg
- 2005: Odd Børretzen
- 2006: Lise Fjeldstad
- 2007: Magnus Grønneberg
- 2008: Kristin Solli Schøien
- 2009: Louis Jacoby
- 2010: Tom Lotherington
- 2011: Finn Wellberg
- 2012: Rolf Bergersen
- 2014: Øyvind Straume
- 2015: Steinar Opstad
- 2016: Helge Torvund
- 2017: Annelita Meinich
- 2018: Knut Ødegård
- 2019: Kåre Conradi
- 2020: Jan Erik Vold
- 2021: Gro Dahle
- 2022: Edvard Hoem
- 2023: Sarah Zahid
- 2024: Hans Olav Brenner
