= Lord of Our Life and God of Our Salvation =

1644 Christian hymn

Christe, du Beistand deiner Kreuzgemeine Lord of Our Life and God of Our Salvation
- by Matthäus Apelles von Löwenstern
- Genre: hymn
- Written: 1644
- Text: Matthäus Apelles von Löwenstern, translated by Philip Pusey

"Lord of Our Life and God of Our Salvation" (German: "Christe, du Beistand deiner Kreuzgemeine") is a German Christian hymn written by Matthäus Apelles von Löwenstern in 1644. It was translated into English in 1840 by Philip Pusey.

== History ==
The song was written during the Thirty Years' War and published semi-anonymously in Löwenstein's book Früelings-Mayen. He wrote it to plead to God for peace. It's based on Psalm 79:9; Revelation 12:10; Psalm 84:11; Matthew 16:18. It was performed by Johann Sebastian Bach. Almost 200 years later, his hymn was discovered by an English parliamentarian Philip Pusey. He found it applicable to the state of the church in England. He found comfort in Löwenstern's prayer and decided to translate it to English and paraphrase it. It was published in Psalm and Hymn Tunes Alexander Robert Reinagle.

== Lyrics ==
German original

Christe, du Beistand deiner Kreuzgemeine,
Eile, mit Hilf und Rettung uns erscheine.
Steure den Feinden, ihre Blutgedichte
Mache zunichte.

Streite doch selber für dein arme Kinder,
Wehre dem Teufel, seine Macht verhinder.
Alles, was kämpfet wider deine Glieder,
Stürze darnieder.

Friede bei Kirch und Schulen uns beschere,
Friede zugleich der Polizei verehre.
Friede dem Herzen, Friede dem Gewissen,
Gib zu genießen.

Also wird zeitlich deine Güt erhoben,
Also wird ewig und ohn Ende loben
Dich, o du Wächter deiner armen Herde,
Himmel und Erde.

English translation

Lord of our life and God of our salvation,
Star of our night and Hope of ev'ry nation:
Hear and receive Your Church's supplication,
Lord God Almighty.

See round Your ark the hungry billows curling;
See how Your foes their banners are unfurling
And with great spite their fiery darts are hurling,
O Lord, preserve us.

Lord, be our light when worldly darkness veils us;
Lord, be our shield when earthly armor fails us;
And in the day when hell itself assails us,
Grant us Your peace, Lord:

Peace in our hearts, where sinful thoughts are raging,
Peace in Your Church, our troubled souls assuaging,
Peace when the world its endless war is waging,
Peace in Your heaven.
