= Hognestad =

Hognestad may refer to:

- Hans Peter Hognestad (1964–), Norwegian television producer
- Helge Hognestad (1940–), Norwegian priest
- Ivar Hognestad (1956–), Norwegian politician
- Ivar Kristiansen Hognestad (1888–1973), Norwegian politician
- Lars Hognestad (1968–), Norwegian television producer
- Peter Hognestad (1866–1931), Norwegian bishop
- Thoralf Hognestad (born 1962), Norwegian curler and coach
- Tor Christian Hognestad (1943–), Norwegian visual artist
