= Julius Høegh-Guldberg (politician) =

Danish politician (1842–1907)

Christopher Julius Emil Høegh-Guldberg
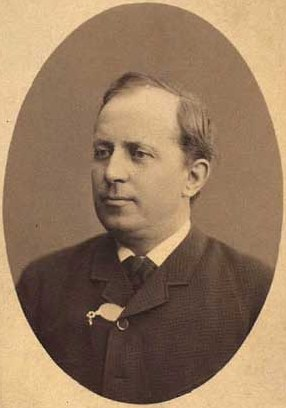
- Christopher Julius Emil Høegh-Guldberg

Member of Folketing for Højre
- In office 1898–1901

Personal details
- Born: 15 March 1842 Aarhus, Denmark
- Died: 6 December 1907 (aged 65) Aarhus, Denmark
- Resting place: Nordre Cemetery, Aarhus, Denmark
- Spouse: Johanne Christiane Buurmeister

Christopher Julius Emil Høegh-Guldberg (15 March 1842 – 6 December 1907) was a Danish politician and attorney general from Aarhus. He was the son of Julius Høegh-Guldberg and half-brother of Emmerik Høegh-Guldberg. Høegh-Guldberg served in numerous local organizations and pioneered work to organize farmers in Jutland. He served in the Danish Folketing for Højre from 1898 to 1901. He was made a Knight af Dannebrog in 1888 and was awarded the Order of the Dannebrog in 1897.

== Public service ==
Høegh-Guldberg eventually settled as the attorney general in Aarhus. Through his work in Aarhus he became known as an advocate for farmers and agriculture. In 1870 he was employed as the secretary in Aarhus Landboforening (English: Aarhus Farmers' Association) and in 1879 he also became a secretary in Fællesforeningen af jyske Landboforeninger (Union of Farmers' Associations in Jutland) which founding and development he was instrumental in. Høegh-Guldberg was also secretary in Det jyske Haveselskab, Det danske Fjerkræavlerselskab (founded in 1891) and Understøttelsesforeningen for trængende jyske Landmænd og deres Efterladte (from 1881). He helped establish and organize the Farmer's Associations in Aalborg in 1883 and in Randers in 1894. He supervised churches owned by the state and in Nørrejylland he evaluated small farms for fire insurance.

He helped formulate and establish the regulations and rules for many of the organizations he was a member of and due to his administrative abilities he became one of the leading figures in the economic and political changes in Denmark through the 19th century. In 1898 Høegh-Guldberg was elected to the Danish parliament, Folketinget, where he served for Højre until 1901. In 1888 he was made Knight af Dannebrog and in 1897 he was awarded the Order of the Dannebrog.

In the last years of his life he helped organize the Danish National Exhibition of 1909.

== Personal life ==
Høegh-Guldberg graduated in 1860 from Aarhus Cathedral School and in 1867 he passed the bar. Høegh-Guldberg married Johanne Christiane Buurmeister (1846–1930) on 14 September 1870. She was the daughter of Frederik Vilhelm Buurmeister (ca. 1797–1851) and Anna Mørch Hahn (1817–1896). He died 1907 in Aarhus and was buried on Nordre Cemetery. The relief on his gravestone was created by Rasmus Andersen.
