= Landstads kirkesalmebog =

Church of Norway hymnal

Landstads kirkesalmebog (Landstad's Church Hymnal), often simply known as Landstads salmebok (Landstad's Hymnal), was the most important hymnal for the Church of Norway from 1870 to 1926.

In 1852, Magnus Brostrup Landstad (1802–1880) started compiling a new church hymnal. At that time, three different hymnals were in use: Kingo's hymnal from 1699, Guldberg's hymnal from 1778, and Evangelisk-christelig Psalmebog (Lutheran-Christian Hymnal) from 1798. All three were therefore Danish and did not satisfy the Church's needs.

In 1855, Landstad published a sample of his translations of Luther's hymns, and in 1856 he published a volume with Christmas hymns. In 1861 he presented his draft new hymnal with 640 hymns arranged in verse form. The draft was sharply criticized because of its use of dialect vocabulary; the bishop and hymnologist Johannes Skaar argued that Landstad had mixed peasant language and cultured language. Landstad replied to the criticism in his book Om Salmebogen, en Redegjørelse (A Statement Regarding the Hymnal, 1862). He made some changes based on the criticism. In 1865 a public committee met to decide on the draft. The hymnal was approved under a royal resolution of October 16, 1869 and it was printed in 1870 and could then be used in parishes that decided to adopt it.

The hymnal had 634 hymns, of which 307 were originally Danish hymns, 203 were German, and 86 were Norwegian. Landstad himself wrote 60 original hymns. In addition, it contained many of his translations. An innovation in the Norwegian context was hymns that were translated from Swedish. One example is "Den blomstertid nu kommer" (Now the Time of Blossoming Arrives), credited to Israel Kolmodin.

On March 4, 1892, Elias Blix's Nokre salmar (Some Hymns) was authorized for use in public worship, and these Landsmål hymns were then incorporated into Landstad's hymnal as nos. 635–791.

Landstad's hymnal was revised by the diocesan provost Gustav Jensen and a committee. Landstads reviderte salmebok (Landstad's Revised Hymnal) was approved under royal resolutions of October 8, 1920 and February 15, 1924, and it was published in 1926.
