= Gunnar Torvund =

Norwegian sculptor (1948–2019)

- Born: 9 July 1948; Nærbø, Norway
- Died: 14 October 2019 (aged 71)
- Occupation: Sculptor
- Relatives: Helge Torvund (brother)

Gunnar Torvund (9 July 1948 – 14 October 2019) was a Norwegian sculptor.

== Personal life ==
Torvund was born in Nærbø to electrician Martin Torvund and Inger Synnøve Risvold Helliesen, and he was a brother of poet Helge Torvund. After art studies in Copenhagen and Oslo, he settled in Kviteseid Municipality in Telemark. He was married to painter Berit Marie Friestad from 1972 to 1990, and later lived with Kristine Brodersen.

== Career ==
His work is represented in the collections of National Gallery of Norway, the Norwegian Museum of Contemporary Art, and at the Gothenburg Museum of Art. Among his more well known works are På flyplassen – eg skal heim from 1971, and Pubertet med belg from 1991, located at the Arendal hospital.
