= Nynorsk salmebok =

Norwegian hymnal

Nynorsk salmebok ('Nynorsk Hymnal'; full title: Nynorsk salmebok for kyrkja og heim og møte 'Nynorsk Hymnal for Church and Home and Meetings') is a Nynorsk hymnal that was edited by Bernt Støylen, Peter Hognestad, and Anders Hovden, and first published in 1925. Under a royal resolution of December 18 that year, it was recognized for use in worship services and in country church parishes (Norwegian: sogn) that adopted it. The hymnal originally contained 711 hymns, and under the royal resolution of October 1, 1926 it was decided to supplement it with 200 Bokmål additions from the old and new Landstad hymnal.

The Nynorsk hymns include 111 original compositions and 75 translated hymns by Elias Blix, 128 originals and 81 translations by Anders Hovden, and 62 originals and 139 translations by Bernt Støylen.

Regarding the collection, Anders Hovden commented: "Støylen was wise and warm, Hognestad was wise and cold. I myself was simply warm."
