= Kingo's hymnal =

1699 Danish Lutheran hymnal by Thomas Kingo

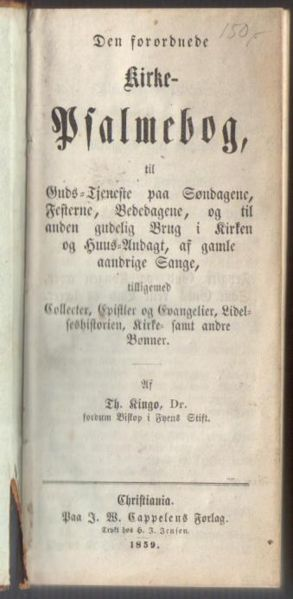
Kingo's hymnal, 1859 edition

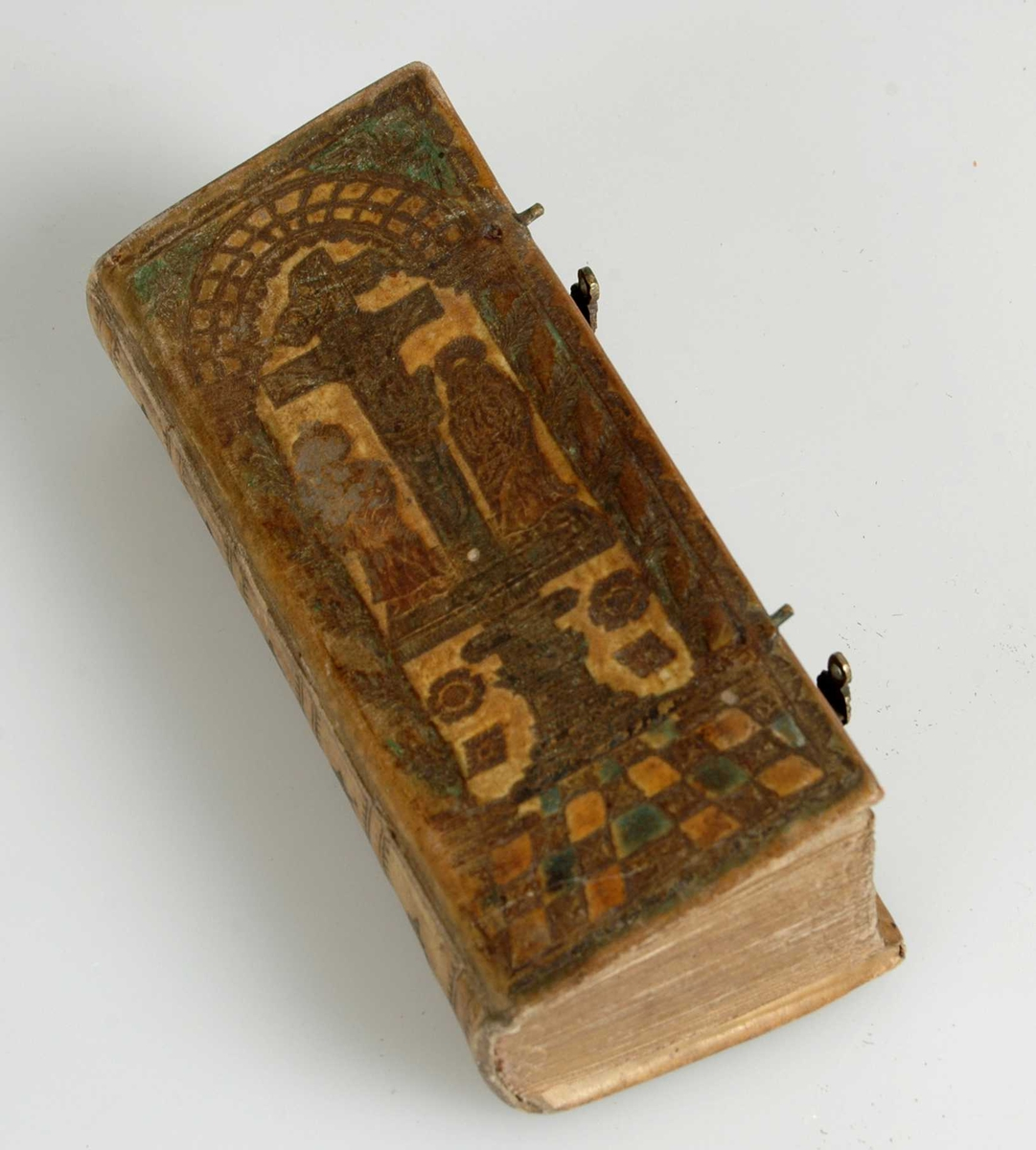
Kingo's hymnal, Norsk Folkemuseum.

Kingo's hymnal, originally titled Dend Forordnede Ny Kirke-Psalme-Bog (lit. 'The Prescribed New Church Hymnal'), is a hymnal that was approved by royal decree for use in all churches in Denmark–Norway in 1699. The hymnal contains 86 hymns by the bishop of Odense, Thomas Kingo. It also bears Kingo's name on the title page because the selection was made based on a hymnal that Kingo had edited ten years earlier.

== History ==
In Denmark, Kingo's hymnal has been replaced by Den Danske Salmebiog.

Kingo's hymnal was in use in a large part of Norway until the 1870s, when it was replaced by Landstads kirkesalmebog (Landstad's Church Hymnal) and Andreas Hauge's Psalmebog for Kirke og Hus (Hymnal for Church and Home). The Strong Believers, a conservative Norwegian group, still use Kingo's hymnal.

== Content ==
The hymnal is arranged according to the liturgical year so that suitable hymns are designated for every holiday during the year. The hymnal contains collects, epistles, and gospel readings for each holiday, and it also contains church prayers and other prayers.
