= Psalmebog for Kirke og Hus =

Norwegian hymnal

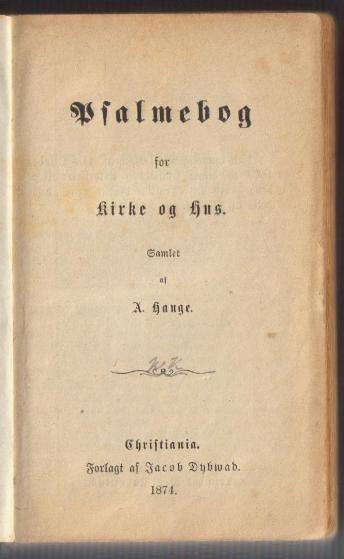
Hauge's hymnal

Psalmebog for Kirke og Hus (Hymnal for Church and Home), better known as Hauges Salmebok (Hauge's Hymnal), was a Norwegian hymnal created by Andreas Hauge. On October 11, 1873, it was authorized for use in public worship in Norway by congregations that adopted it.

The hymnal followed a draft version that Hauge had published in 1863. The hymnal was conservative both in its selection of hymns and in its language. It competed with the more popular Landstads kirkesalmebog and never became particularly widespread. In 1904, 96 of the 965 parishes in Norway were using Hauge's hymnal.
