= Helge Torvund =

Norwegian writer

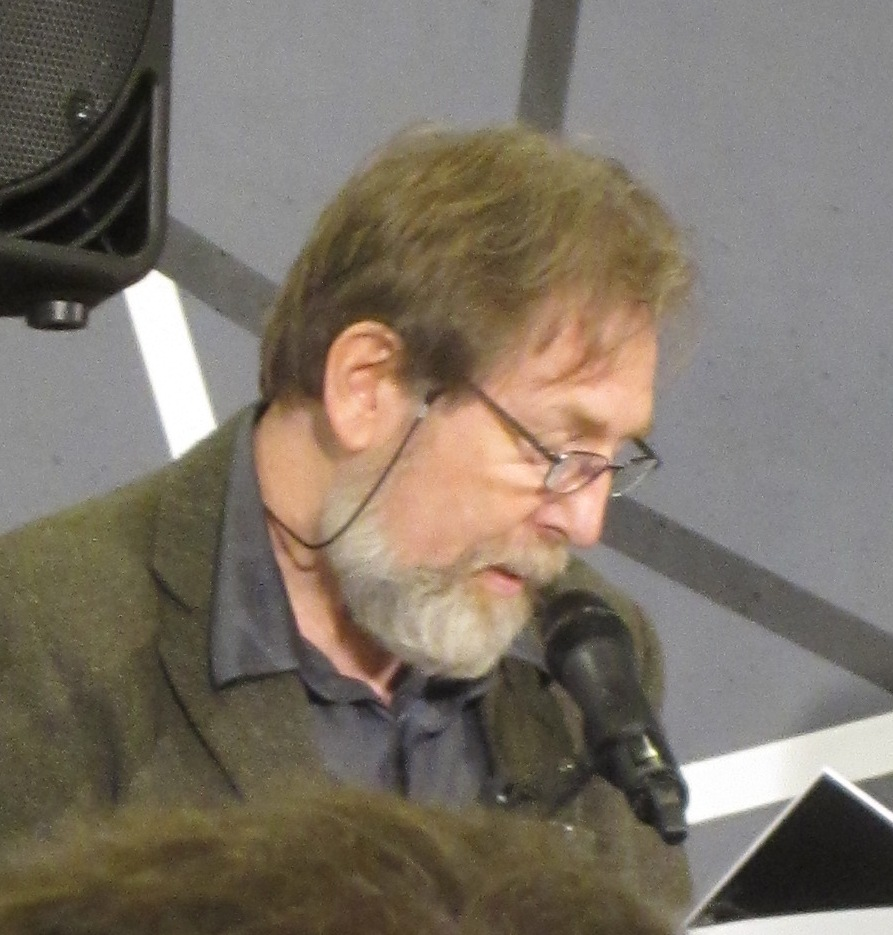
- Born: 20 August 1951 (age 75); Nærbø, Norway
- Occupations: Psychologist; Poet; Essayist; Literary critic Children's writer
- Relatives: Gunnar Torvund (brother)
- Awards: Nynorsk Literature Prize (1989); Herman Wildenvey Poetry Award (2016); Dobloug Prize (2018)

Helge Torvund (born 20 August 1951) is a Norwegian psychologist, poet, essayist, literary critic and children's writer. He was born in the village of Nærbø in Nærbø Municipality (in the present-day Hå Municipality) and is brother of sculptor Gunnar Torvund.

He made his literary debut in 1977 with Hendene i byen. In 1989 he was awarded the Nynorsk Literature Prize for the poetry collection Den monotone triumf. He received the Herman Wildenvey Poetry Award in 2016. From 2015 he has been writing monthly in the newspaper Klassekampen. One of these articles has been translated and published by York Art Gallery as "Carnal Light".

He was awarded the Dobloug Prize in 2018.

His children's book Vivaldi (NYRB, 2019) was included in Flavorwire's 20 Most Beautiful Children's Books of All Time.

In 2022 The Song Cave published a book length poem called "Seriosuly well". [https://the-song-cave.com/products/seriously-well-by-helge-torvund.
