= Kristin Solli Schøien =

Norwegian author and composer (born 1954)

Kristin Solli Schøien (born July 14, 1954 in Oslo) is a Norwegian author and composer.

Schøien studied at NLA University College, the University of Oslo, and the Norwegian Academy of Music. She is especially known for her hymnwriting.

Schøien lives in Eidskog Municipality and was previously employed as a lecturer at the Norwegian School of Theology. She also became known for the cabaret show Jeg synger min sang for vinden (I Sing My Song to the Wind), which sets to music poetry by Herman Wildenvey. It was first staged in 1990, and later in many places throughout Norway. A CD with the same title was later issued.

== Awards ==
- Brunlanes Municipality Culture Award (1986) (for creating a show based on poetry by Herman Wildenvey set to music)
- Herman Wildenvey Poetry Award (2008)

== Bibliography ==
- Vet du ikke at du er rik (Don't You Know You're Rich; Oslo: Credo Forlag, 1971)
- På min egen måte – 33 sanger og bibelviser (In My Own Way: 33 Songs and Bible Verses; Oslo: Verbum Forlag, 1993)
- Når skoen trykker – om tro og troverdighet (When the Shoe Pinches: Faith and Credibility; Oslo: IM-forlaget, 1993)
- Fra torget til vingården – metode og ressursbok for gudstjenestearbeid (From the Square to the Vineyard: Method and Resource Manual for Liturgy; Oslo: Luther Forlag, 2001)
- Kirkebygget – bruk og vern, studieveiledning for Kirketjenerskolen (The Church Building: Use and Protection, a Study Guide for Sexton Education; Kristiansand: Høyskoleforlaget, 2002)
- En kurv til min datter (A Basket for My Daughter; Oslo: Luther Forlag, 2003)
