= Hald Manor =

Manor house in Viborg Municipality, Denmark

- Hald Hovedgård
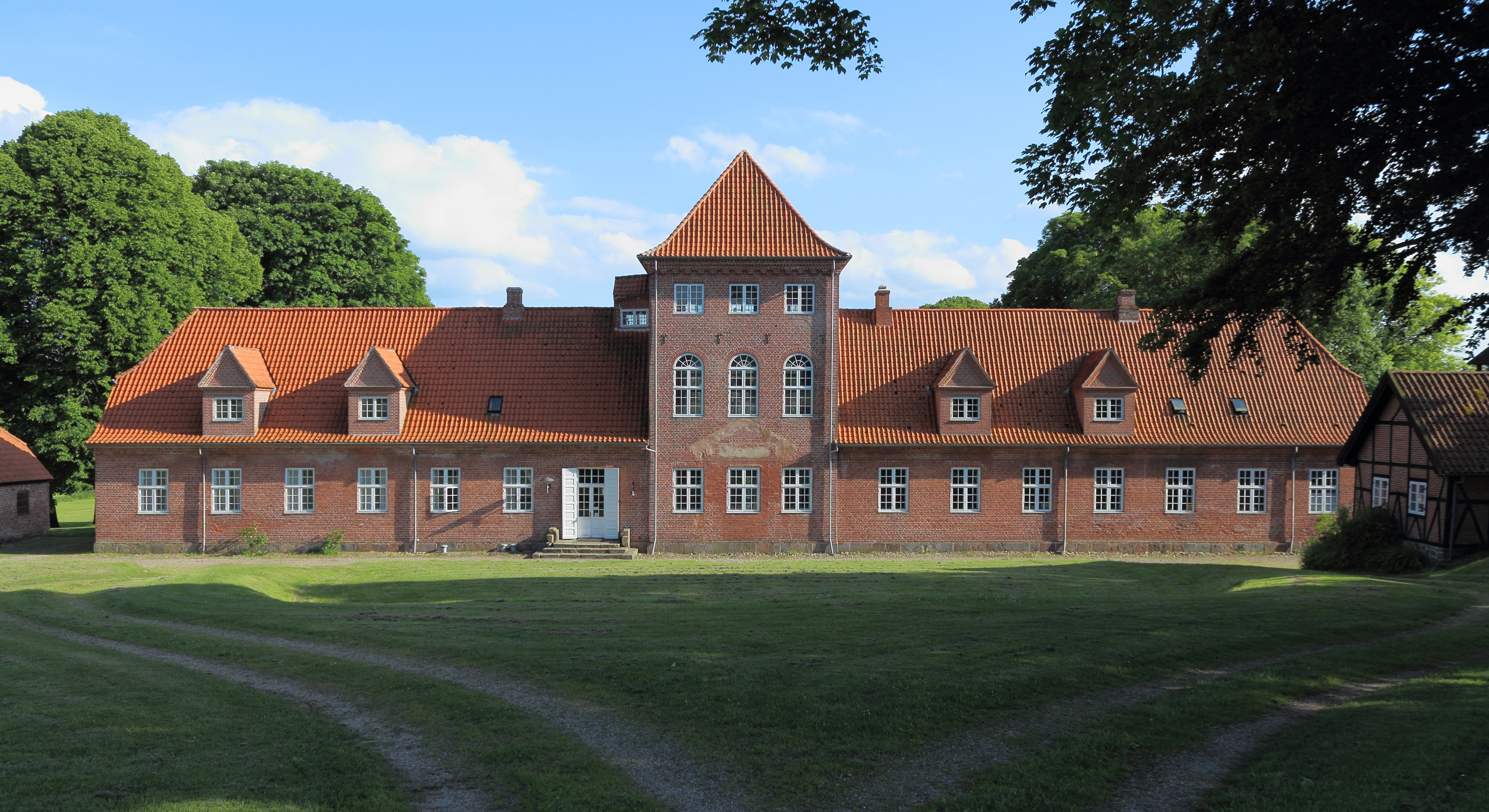
- The main building seen from North
- Interactive map of the Hald Manor area

General information
- Location: Viborg Municipality, Denmark
- Coordinates: 56°23′34.51″N 09°20′37.86″E
- Completed: 1798
- Owner: Danish state

Hald Manor (Danish: Hald Hovedgård) is located 7 km south-west of Viborg, Denmark. Now owned by the Danish state, it is used as a venue for meetings and conferences.

Hald Manor is a single storey building with a 3-storey central section, originally built as a gatehouse in 1798. The two pavilions in the park were probably built in 1795.

== History ==
=== First and second Hald ===
The first known reference to Hald is from 1328 when it was owned by Rigsmarsk Ludvig Albertsen Eberstein. Then known as Brattingsborg, was located to the east of the current main building.

Niels Bugge acquired Hald in 1346 and built a new main building where he took up residence. He was active in the uprising against King Valdemar IV and was later killed on the way back from failed peace negotiations at Slagelse. Bugge's son-in-law Skarpenberg took over Hald but soon had to sell it to Queen Margaret I who later gave the estate to the Bishop Seat in Viborg in 1383.

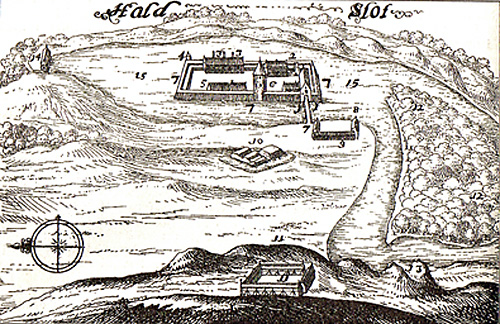
Hald depicted by Peder Hansen Resen in the mid-17th century, showing Bishop Friis' castle. The oldest house is seen just below (No. 10) and Niels Bugge's Hald is seen in the lower right corner (No. 13)

=== The third Hald ===
The third Hald was built in 1528 for Jørgen Friis, Bishop of Viborg, on a small peninsula reaching into the lake. Ruins surrounded by tall earthworks can still be seen at the site, although the remains of a tower in masonry are partly a reconstruction.

=== Fourth and fifth Hald ===
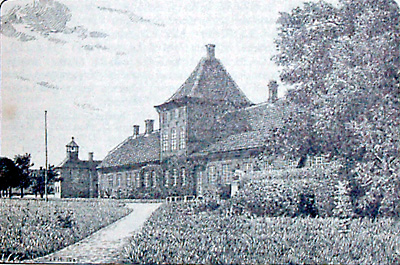
Today's Hald seen, c. 1900

The fourth Hald was completed in 1703 for General Gregers Daa. It was a four-winged half-timbered building located a little south of the current building, in the current park, but nothing remains of it today.

The Fifth Hald, was built in 1798 for Ove Høegh-Guldberg, who had served as Prime Minister from 1772 to 1784.

== Today ==
The Danish Centre for Writers and Translators was founded in 2002. It offers writers, translators and illustrators free stays where they can work in a peaceful environment. The centre also hosts and arranges various public literary events.

A barn from the mid-18th century was renovated in 2008 and is now home to an exhibition about the area's geography, nature and history.

The estate covers 973 hectares. Some of the land is farmed organically by the Danish Nature Agency which is attached to the Danish Ministry of Environment, while the rest is forest, part of Fussingø State Forest District.

In his ghost story Number 13 (1904) M. R. James writes that Hald is "accounted one of the prettiest things in Denmark".
