= Ove Høegh-Guldberg =

Danish statesman (1731–1808)

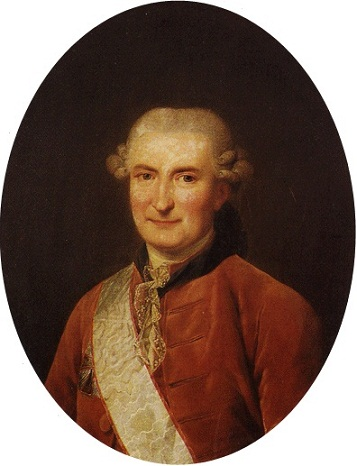

Privy Councillor of Denmark
- Predecessor: Johann Friedrich Struensee
- Successor: Andreas Peter Bernstorff
- Born: Ove Guldberg; 1 September 1731; Horsens, Jutland, Denmark
- Died: 7 February 1808 (aged 76); Hald Manor in Viborg, Denmark
- Spouses: Cathrine Marie Nørlem (m. 1762–1763) Lucie Emmerentze Nørlem (m. 1769–1807)
- Issue: Juliane Marie Høegh-Guldberg; Frederik Hoegh Guldberg; Peter Hoegh Guldberg; Christian Hoegh Guldberg; Julius Høegh-Guldberg

Ove Høegh-Guldberg (born Guldberg; 1 September 1731 – 7 February 1808) was a Danish statesman, historian, and de facto prime minister of Denmark during the reign of the mentally unstable King Christian VII.

== Biography ==
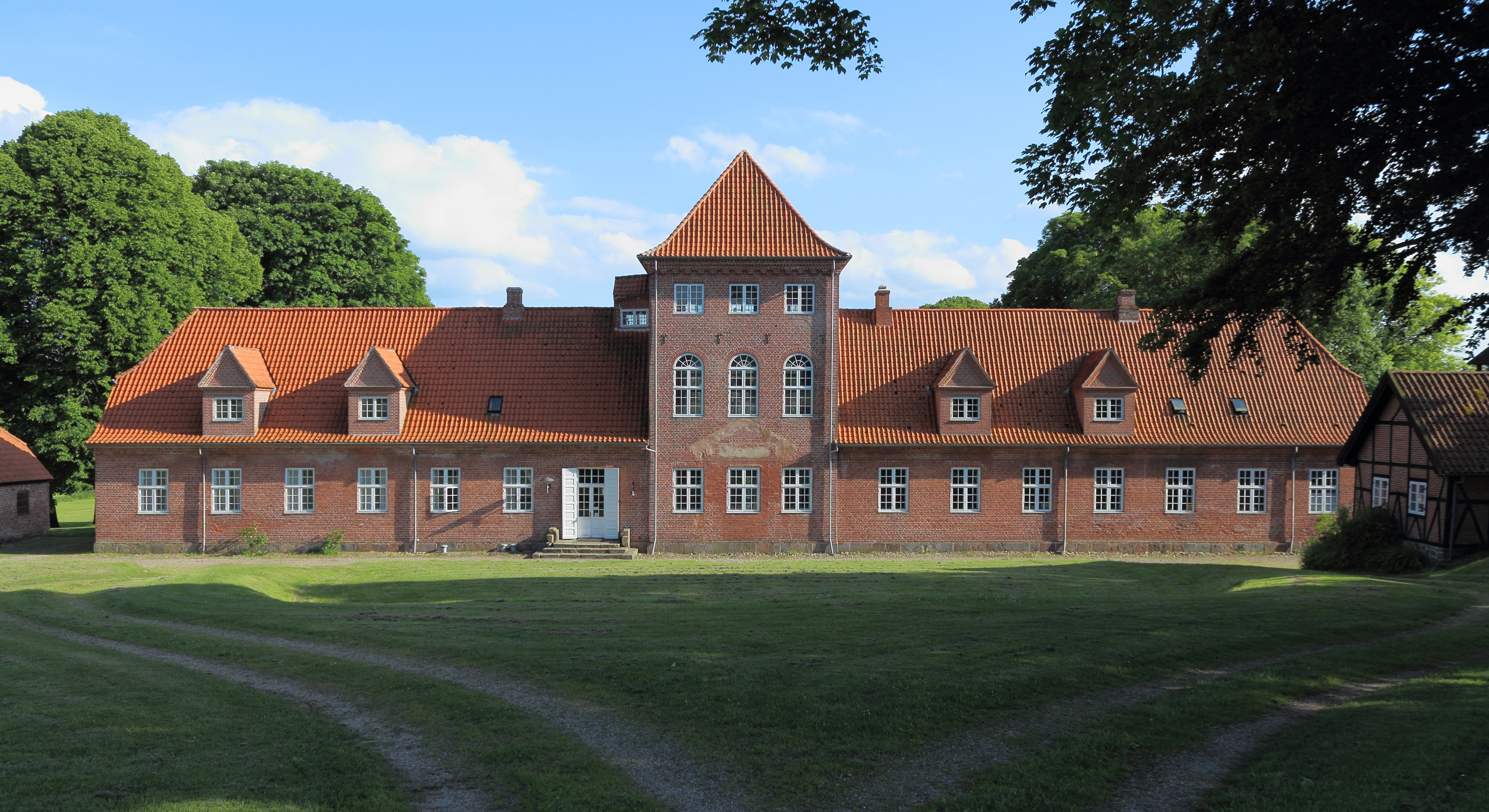
Hald Manor

Guldberg was born at Horsens in Jutland, Denmark-Norway. He was the son of Jørgen Pedersen Høg (1683–1751), a merchant and undertaker, and his wife Helene Dorthea Ovesdatter Guldberg (c. 1697 – 1742). With the support of his maternal uncle Dines Guldberg, a priest in Gylling, he was educated as a theologian; he earned a theology degree in 1753. Later he became a historian and in 1761 a professor at Sorø Academy. Like many other middle class academics of his age, he was a mixture of patriotic pragmatist and orthodox royalist.

In 1764 he was connected to Queen Juliana Maria as the house teacher of her son, Hereditary Prince Frederick, and in 1771 he became the latter's cabinet secretary. In his new position, his national and conservative views influenced the prince, and the appointment launched Guldberg's future political career. Being a conservative and devoted monarchist, he made common cause with the opposition against the rule of Johann Friedrich Struensee (1737–1772), regarding him a revolutionary and usurper. He was a leader of the conspiracy against Struensee in 1771.

After the fall of Struensee in 1772, Guldberg became the leader of the new government. Not formally designated a cabinet minister until shortly before his own fall, he is regarded as the de facto prime minister for most of this period, but he remained hidden behind the Hereditary Prince as Regent. He became assessor in the Treasury in 1773. In 1774, he was appointed secretary to the king and in 1776 he became secretary of state. In 1777 was ennobled as Høegh-Guldberg. In 1780 he received the title of council secretary. Like Struensee, he mostly governed through direct cabinet orders, relying upon his influence on the royal guardians of the mentally ill Christian VII.

The 'Guldberg Rule' was marked by peace and rest, and initially by good economic conditions. Høegh-Guldberg's foreign policy was decidedly peaceful even to Sweden. As a neutral state, Denmark-Norway enjoyed an upturn in trade during the American Revolutionary War. In domestic politics he successfully followed nationalist policies, making him popular among many commoners. The Act of Citizenship of 1776 that excluded foreigners from public posts of the monarchy was especially popular.

Guldberg also supported gifted Danish poets and authors, including Jörgen Zoega (1755–1809). Being an outspoken Danish nationalist, doubtless he also used this as a propaganda asset. A severe weakening of his rule was linked to his financial mismanagement and growing corruption. He showed no understanding of the plight of the peasants, and he abolished most of the reforms of Struensee. Though a provincial himself, Guldberg totally favoured the capital at the expense of the provinces. The deaths and removals of some of his government colleagues including Heinrich Carl von Schimmelmann (1724–1782) and Andreas Peter Bernstorff (1735–1797) enlarged his field of activity, but also made him more vulnerable to critics.

An economic downturn after the end of the American Revolutionary War undermined his popularity, but more importantly like his royal employers Queen Dowager Juliana Maria and Frederick, Hereditary Prince of Denmark, he had fallen badly out with the Crown Prince (afterwards Frederick VI) whose growing opposition he seems to have ignored. In April 1784, just as he had been appointed a minister, he was forced to resign following the Crown Prince's coup d'état. He was then reduced to the rank of senior official (amtmand) until 1802. He retired to Hald Manor (Hald Hovedgaard) in Viborg which he had purchased in 1798.

== Personal life ==
He was first married in 1762 with Cathrine Marie Nørlem (1736–1763), daughter of trustee at Bygholm Peder Jensen Nørlem (1680-1738 ) and Christentze Hansdatter Lessow (1701–1769). He was married a second time in 1769 to Lucie Emmerentze Nørlem (1738-1807), sister of his first wife.

He was the father of military officer Julius Høegh-Guldberg (1779–1861) and grandfather of artist Emmerik Høegh-Guldberg (1807–1881).

Ove Høegh-Guldberg had a number of direct descendants, including his namesake, the Australian biologist Ove Hoegh-Guldberg.

== See also ==
- Guldberg's hymnal

== Other sources ==
- Sven Cedergreen Bech, 1965 Politikens Danmarkshistorie, vol. 9
- Jens Vibæk, 1964 Politikens Danmarkshistorie, vol. 10
- Ole Feldbæk, 2003 Gyldendal og Politikens Danmarkshistorie, vol. 9
- Edvard Holm, 1906 Danmark-Norges Historie vol. 5

Political offices
Preceded by Johann Friedrich Struensee	Privy Councillor of Denmark; 1772 - 1784	Succeeded by Andreas Peter Bernstorff
