= Aarhus Tech =

Technical school in Aarhus, Denmark

Coordinates: 56.1845°N 10.1923°E

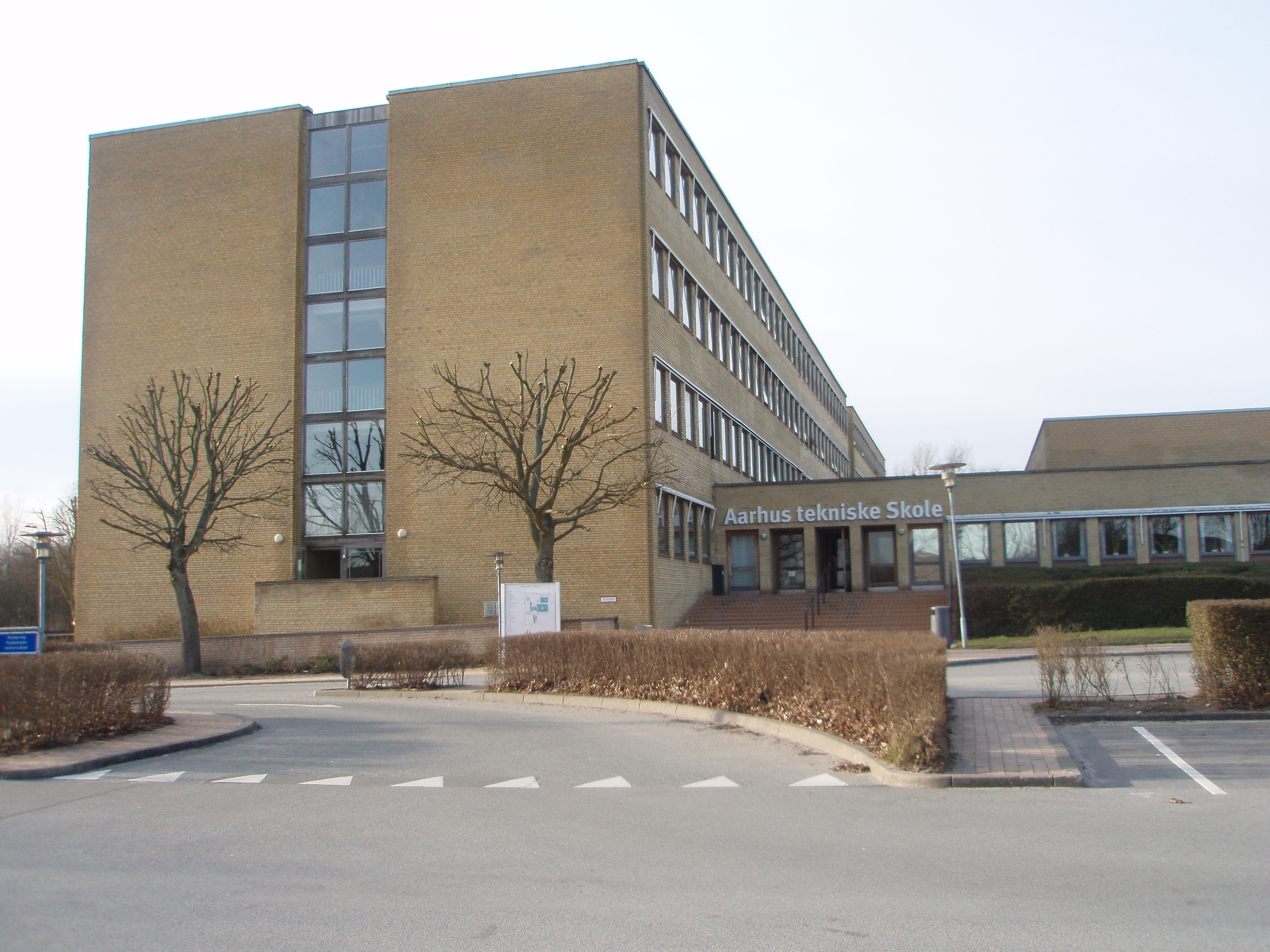
- Former name: Aarhus Tekniske Skole
- Type: Private
- Established: 1828; 198 years ago
- President: Annette E. Lauridsen
- Administrative staff: 650
- Students: 3800 (2014)
- Location: Aarhus, Denmark
- Website: aarhustech.dk

Aarhus Tech (until 2011 Aarhus Tekniske Skole) is a technical school in Aarhus, which provides secondary education and vocational education.

Aarhus Tech offers degrees in 34 disciplines in vocational studies, from masonry and welding to clothing design and cooking. The annual budget is DKK 410 mio. and the school employs 650 people. It is managed as a private institution. The school comprises buildings on three separate sites in Aarhus, but the main campus is located on Christiansbjerg in Business Park Skejby, Aarhus N.

== History ==
The college was founded as "Prinds Frederik Ferdinands Tegne- og Søndagsskole" in 1828. Through a series of mergers, the school has since grown to become one of the largest technical colleges in Denmark, with 3800 students (2014). In 2002, the college merged with AMU Østjylland.

In 2014, Aarhus Gymnasium, Teknisk Gymnasium Christiansbjerg, and Teknisk Gymnasium Aarhus Midtby merged into Aarhus Tech. Prior to the merger, Teknisk Gymnasium Christiansbjerg (TGC) had offered a three-year technical exam program (HTX) since 1984.

== Notable students ==
- Anders Eggert (TGC)
