= Herman Wildenvey =

Norwegian poet

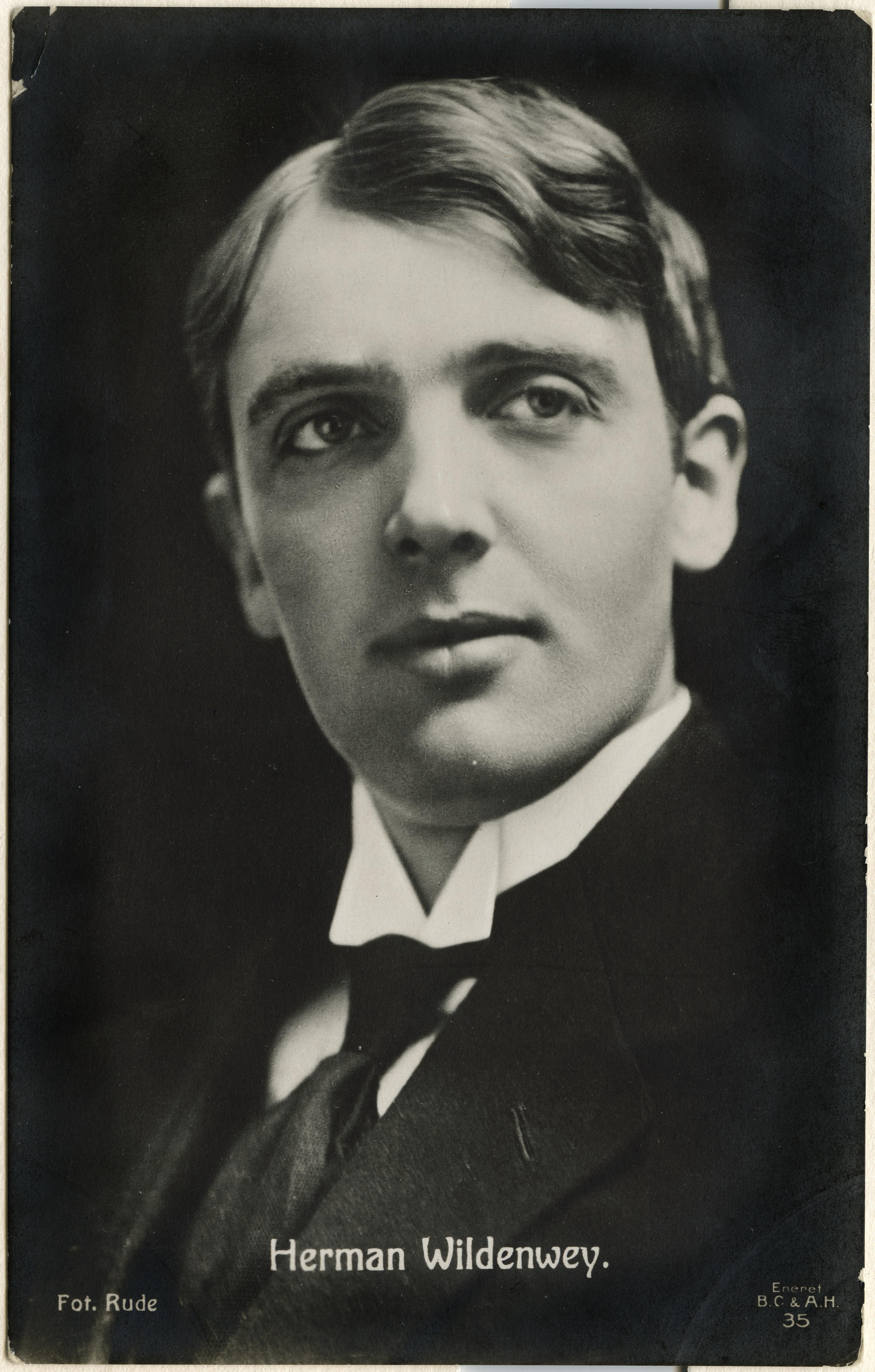
- Born: Herman Theodor Portaas; July 20, 1885; Mjøndalen, Norway
- Died: September 27, 1959 (aged 74); Stavern, Norway
- Occupations: Poet, translator

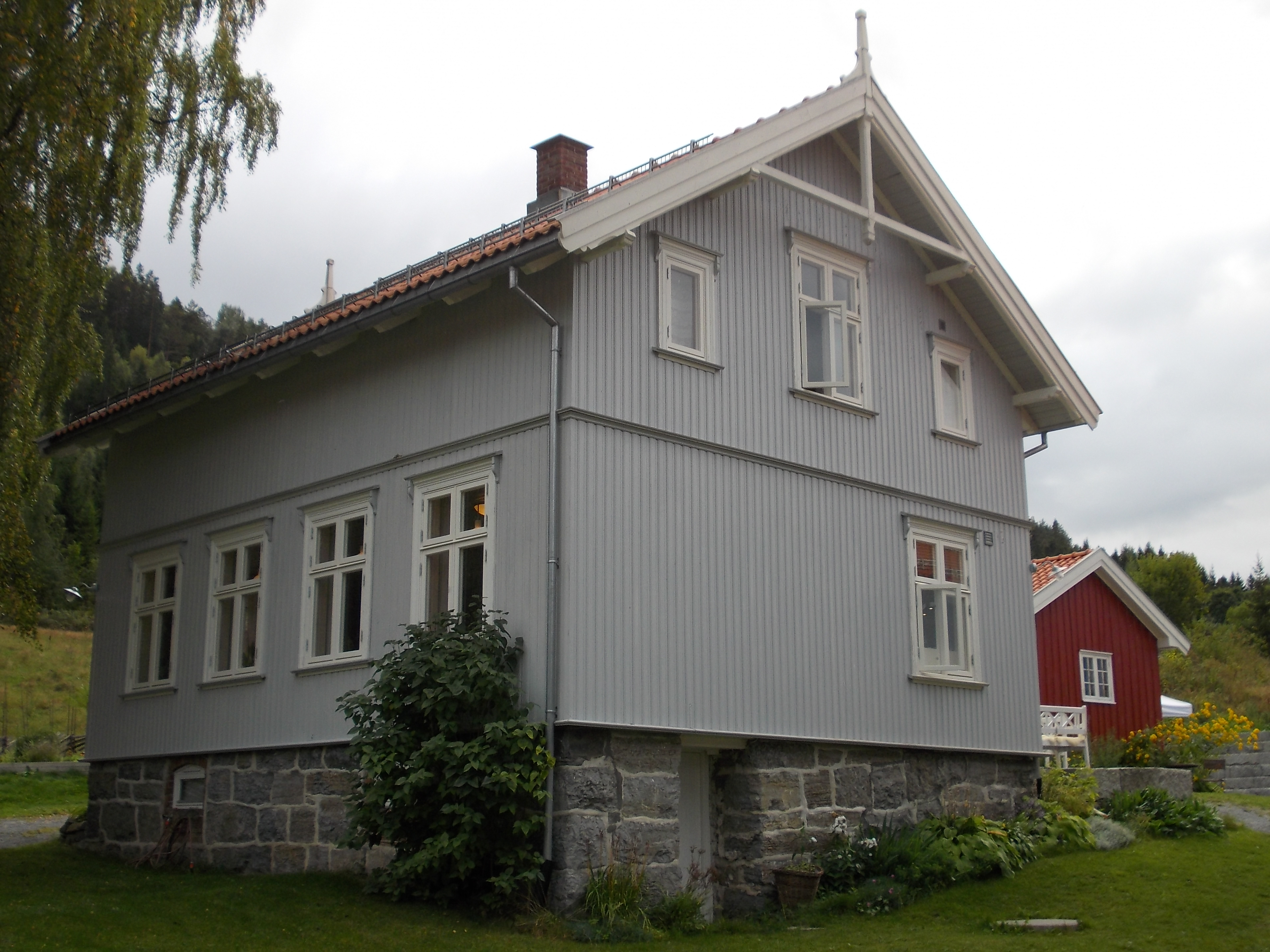
Portåsen - childhood home of Herman Wildenvey

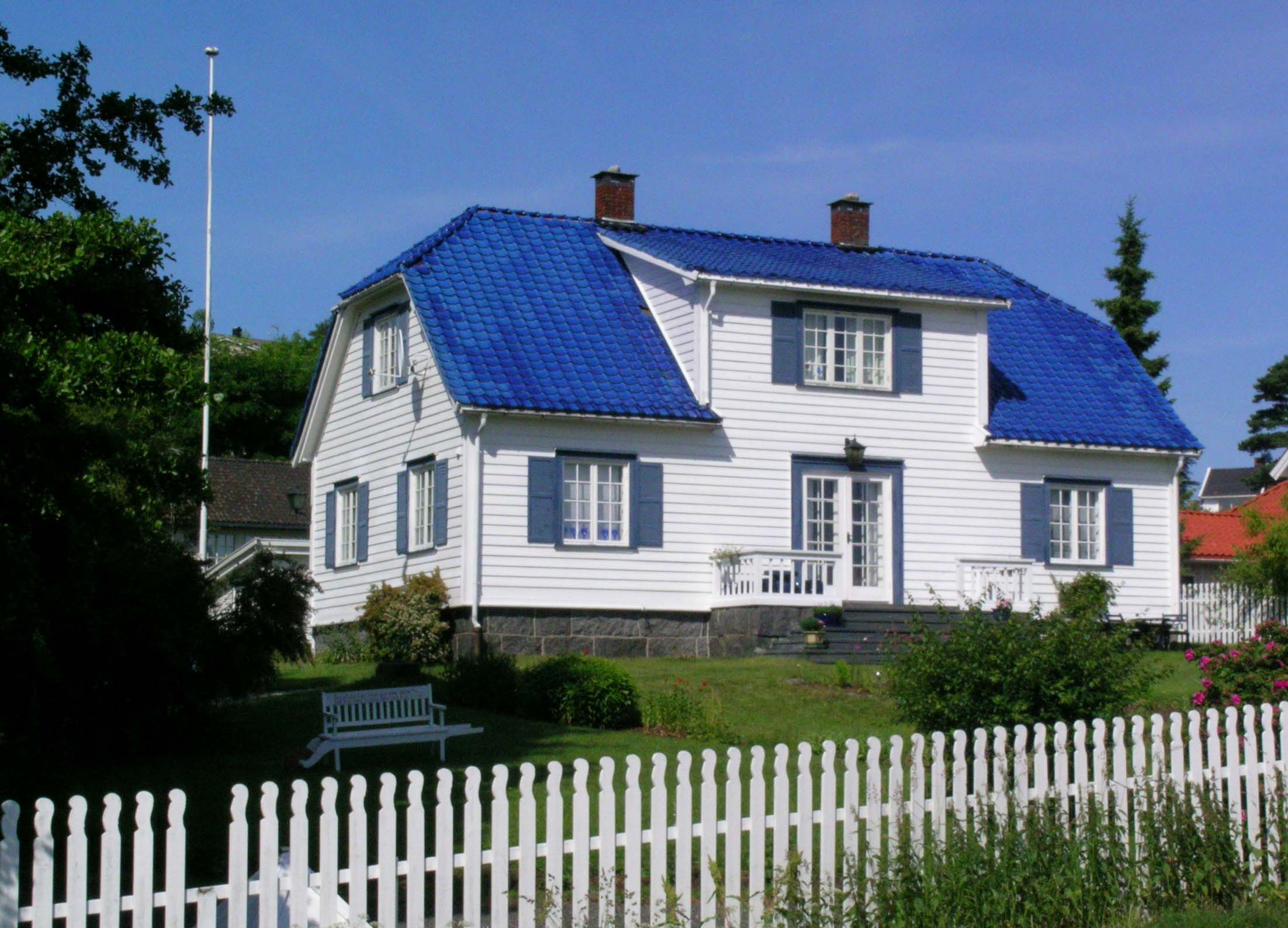
Hergisheim - Wildenvey home in Stavern

Herman Wildenvey (20 July 1885 – 27 September 1959), born Herman Theodor Portaas, was one of the most prominent Norwegian poets of the twentieth century. During his lifetime he published 44 books of his own poetry, in addition to translations of William Shakespeare, Ernest Hemingway, and Heinrich Heine. He was married to the novelist Gisken Wildenvey.

== Biography ==
Wildenvey was born at Mjøndalen in Nedre Eiker, near the city of Drammen in Buskerud, Norway. He was the son of Lauritz Portaas and Hanna Kristine Grosvold. He was born outside of marriage. His mother remained unmarried while his father married her younger sister. His childhood home, from which he got his surname at birth, was called Portåsen.

He emigrated to the United States in 1904, but returned to Norway during the summer of 1906. On 28 June 1904 the Danish passenger liner, SS Norge ran aground on the skerry Hasselwood Rock, close to Rockall, on Helen's Reef in the North Atlantic. According to Sebak's comprehensive account, the final death toll was 635, among them 225 Norwegian citizens. The 160 survivors spent up to eight days in open lifeboats before rescue. Several more people died in the days that followed rescue as a result of their exposure to the elements and drinking the salt water. Herman Wildenvey was among the survivors.

In 1912, he married the nineteen year old Jonette Kramer Andreassen (later known as Gisken Wildenvey). Their joint surname was changed to Wildenvey by declaration 1929. From 1913 to 1922 the couple had a residence in Copenhagen, although he spent much of his time in Kristiania (now Oslo).

After living some years in Oslo and Copenhagen, the couple settled in the small coastal town of Stavern in 1923, where they built their home Hergisheim in 1927. The couple lived there for the rest of their lives. In 1935, he was awarded the Gyldendal's Endowment. In 1955, four years before he died, Herman Wildenvey was honoured with title of Commander of the Royal Order of St. Olav on the merit of his writing. He died in his home town of Stavern and was buried in Vår Frelsers gravlund in Oslo.

Today his childhood home, Portåsen in Mjøndalen, is a museum honouring his life and writing. Portåsen, Wildenveys rike is a cultural centre, meeting place and venue for local, regional and national artists. The site includes a newly renovated farmhouse and farm buildings. Stiftelsen Portåsen is the organization which works on the development of Portåsen and which operates in affiliation with Buskerud Museum (Buskerudmuseet), a foundation for the preservation of cultural heritage within Buskerud.

The Wildenvey Society (Wildenvey-selskapet) presents the Herman Wildenvey Poetry Award (Herman Wildenveys Poesipris) annually. The award is conferred every year on July 20, the anniversary of his birth date. The event is held at Hergisheim, his home in Stavern. The award includes a bronze slate plaque from a design made by sculptor Ørnulf Bast. The prize is given to a person or institution that has helped foster interest in Herman Wildenvey's poetry.

== Partial bibliography ==
=== Original works ===
Direct translations of Norwegian titles shown in parentheses.

- 1902 Campanula
- 1907 Nyinger ("Camp Fires")
- 1908 Digte ("Poems")
- 1910 Ringsgang ("Walking in Circles")
- 1911 Prismer ("Prisms")
- 1913 Lys over land ("Light Over Land")
- 1913 Årets eventyr ("The Adventure of the Year")
- 1915 Brendende Hjerter ("Burning Hearts")
- 1916 Kjærtegn ("Caresses")
- 1917 Digte i utvalg ("Selected Poems")
- 1917 Flygtninger ("Fugitives")
- 1919 Hemeligheter ("Secrets")
- 1919 Alle slags vers ("All Sorts of Verse")
- 1920 Troll i ord ("Words Come True")
- 1920 Den glemte have ("The Forgotten Garden")
- 1921 Nedfallsfrugt ("Fruit on the Ground")
- 1922 Nye digte i udvalg ("New Selected Poems")
- 1923 Ildorkestret ("The Fire Orchestra")
- 1924 Streiftog i hjembygden ("Home Town Revisited")
- 1925 Fiken av tistler ("Figs out of Thistles")
- 1926 Der falder stjerner ("Stars are Falling")
- 1926 Prosa i utvalg ("Selected Prose")
- 1927 Samlede digt ("Collected Poems")
- 1927 Et Herrens år ("A Year of The Lord", or "Anno Domini")
- 1930 Dagenes sang, Ringen ("The Song of Days", "The Ring")
- 1931 Høstens lyre ("The Harp of Autumn")
- 1931 Digte i utvalg ("Selected Poems")
- 1932 På ville veier ("Running Wild")
- 1935 Stjernenes speil ("Mirrors of the Stars")
- 1936 Samlede digt ("Collected Poems")
- 1936 En ung manns flukt ("A Young Man's Escape")
- 1937 Vingehesten og verden ("The Winged Horse and the World") (translated into German the same year, as Mein Pegasus)
- 1938 Den nye rytmen ("The New Rhythm")
- 1940 En lykkelig tid ("Happy Days")
- 1941 Samlede dikt ("Collected Poems")
- 1946 Filomele
- 1947 Ved sangens kilder ("At the Springs of Song")
- 1948 Ringsgang (revised version of the 1910 edition)
- 1950 Mine sangers bok ("The Book of My Songs")
- 1952 Polyhymnia
- 1953 Ugler til Athen (translated by Joseph Auslander as Owls to Athens)
- 1956 Soluret ("The Sundial")
- 1957 Samlede dikt ("Collected Poems")
- 1969 Efterklang ("Aftertones") (edited by his wife, Gisken Wildenvey)

=== Translations ===
- 1912 William Shakespeare: As you like it (Norw. title: Livet i skogen; "Life in the Forest")
- 1926 Paul Géraldy: Toi et moi (Norw. title: Du og jeg; "You and Me")
- 1929 Heinrich Heine: Buch der Lieder (Norw. title: Sangenes bok; "The Book of Songs")
- 1930 Ernest Hemingway: A Farewell to Arms (Norw. title: Farvel til våpnene)
- 1931 Liam O'Flaherty: Mr. Gilhooley
- 1942 Aisōpos: Aesop's Fables (Norw. title: Æsops fabler)

=== Awards ===
- Gyldendal's Endowment for 1935
