= Gisken Wildenvey =

Norwegian novelist and author

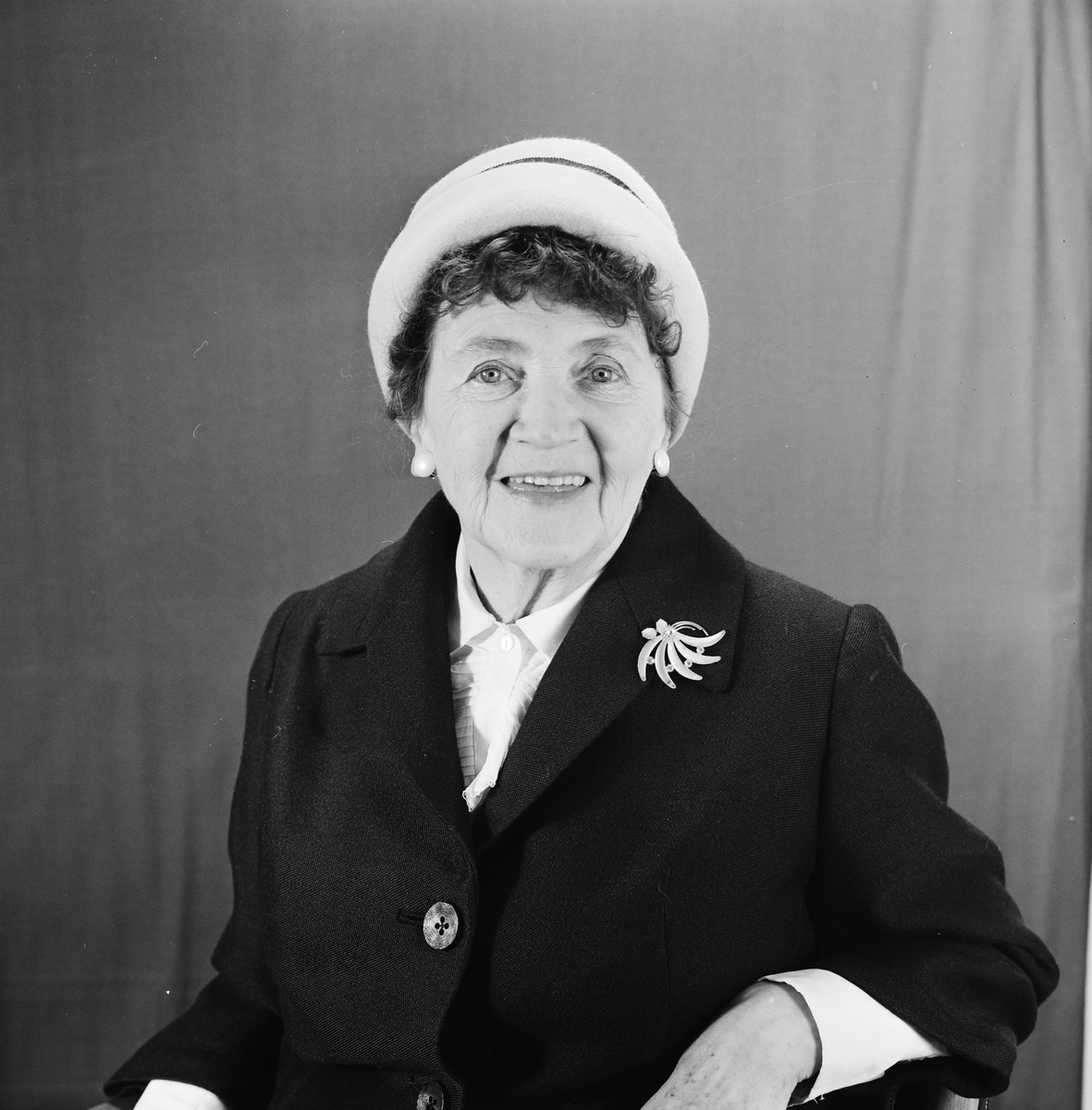
- Gisken Wildenvey in 1964
- Born: 23 March 1892; Vågan, Norway
- Died: 14 January 1985 (aged 92)
- Occupations: Novelist and short story writer
- Awards: Gyldendal's Endowment (1965)

Gisken Wildenvey (23 March 1892 – 14 January 1985) was a Norwegian novelist and author of short stories.

Jonette Pauline Andreassen was born on the island of Austvågøya in Vågan Municipality in Lofoten, Norway. She was the daughter of farmer Anton Lauritz Andreassen and Inger Martha Jentoft Petersen. The name Gisken had been given to her by the poet Herman Wildenvey whom she married in 1912. From 1927 they lived at Hergisheim in Stavern Municipality.

She made her literary debut in 1925 with the short story collection Bedaarere. She was awarded the Gyldendal's Endowment in 1965.
