= Landstads reviderte salmebok =

Norwegian hymnal used from 1926 to 1985

Landstads reviderte salmebok (Landstad's Revised Hymnal) was a hymnal authorized for public worship in Norway under the royal resolutions of October 9, 1920 and February 15, 1924. The book was the Church of Norway's official hymnal until 1985, together with Nynorsk salmebok.

Under the royal resolution of 1908, Dean Gustav Jensen received a commission to prepare a proposal for the revision of Landstads kirkesalmebog (Landstad's Church Hymnal) of 1869. Jensen delivered his Forslag til en revideret Salmebok for den norske kirke (Proposals for a Revised Hymnal for the Church of Norway) in 1915. Even though Jensen wanted to preserve the character at Landstad's hymnal, he made extensive revisions to the hymn selection and the lyrics of the individual hymns. He also included Nynorsk hymns. Starting in 1916, a committee worked on the proposed changes under the leadership of Bishop Jens Frølich Tandberg. The committee put forward a separate proposal in 1918. After the deaths of both Tandberg and Jensen in 1922, the work was carried on under the leadership of the parish priest J. H. H. Brochmann. Landstads reviderte salmebok was finally approved for public use in 1924 and it was published in 1926.

The hymnal is still being used in some conservative parishes in Finnmark.
