= Elias Blix =

Norwegian professor, theologian, hymn writer and politician

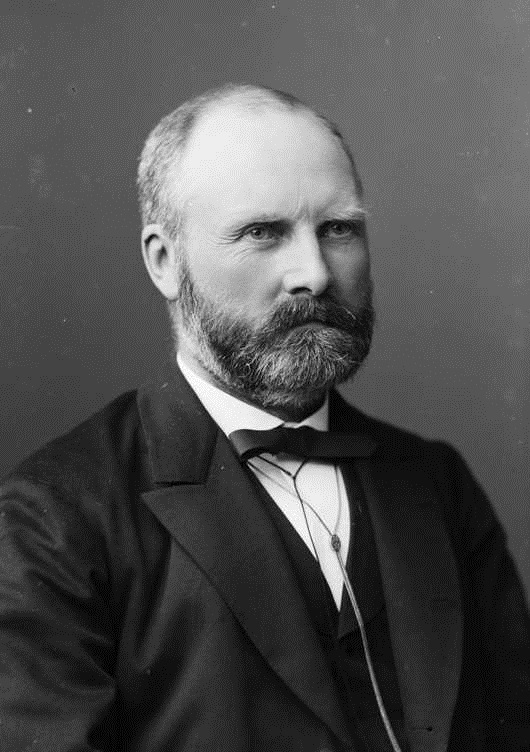

Minister of Education and Church Affairs
- In office 1 November 1886 – 24 February 1888
- Prime Minister: Johan Sverdrup
- Preceded by: Jakob Sverdrup
- Succeeded by: Jakob Sverdrup
- In office 26 June 1884 – 15 August 1885
- Prime Minister: Johan Sverdrup
- Preceded by: Nils Hertzberg
- Succeeded by: Jakob Sverdrup

Personal details
- Born: 24 February 1836 Sørarnøy, United Kingdoms of Sweden and Norway
- Died: 17 January 1902 (aged 65) Christiania, United Kingdoms of Sweden and Norway
- Party: Liberal
- Spouse: Emma Hansen
- Children: Helge; Ragnvald; Marie; Einar
- Occupation: Professor; Theologian; Hymn writer Politician

Elias Blix (24 February 1836 – 17 January 1902) was a Norwegian professor, theologian, hymn writer, and a politician for the Liberal Party. Blix wrote numerous hymns and was largely responsible for translating the New Testament into the Norwegian language.

== Biography ==
Born on Sandhornøy in Gildeskål Municipality, in the Salten district of Nordland County, Norway. He attended a teacher seminary in Tromsø (1853–1855). After some years as a teacher in Tromsø, he moved to Christiania for studies in 1859. He was a student of Semitic languages. Blix graduated in 1860 and received his theological degree in 1866 and earned a Dr. philos. in 1876.

Blix worked as a teacher for 25 years at the University of Oslo, where he taught Hebrew and Bible studies. Blix was Minister of Education and Church Affairs in the Cabinet of Johan Sverdrup from 1884 to 1888, interrupted by a period as member of the Council of State Division in Stockholm in 1885–86.

Blix was also a proponent of the Nynorsk language, as well as a composer of psalms and hymns. Among his best known hymns are Gud signe vårt dyre fedreland and No livnar det i lundar. His collection of hymns in Nynorsk, Nokre salmar, published between the years 1869 to 1875, was in 1892 permitted for official use in the Church of Norway, alongside the official version. Together with Johannes Belsheim and Matias Skard, Blix was a major contributor to the Nynorsk translation of the New Testament, which was published in 1890.

Nordlendingenes Forening was founded in 1862 by Elias Blix together with educator, clergyman and engineer Ole Tobias Olsen (1830–1924). The society is a fraternal association of people who have emigrated from the counties of Nordland, Troms and Finnmark in Northern Norway. In honor of the society's 50th anniversary in 1912, a commemorative medal was first established in memory of Petter Dass, the clergyman and poet from Helgeland. The Petter Dass Medal (Petter Dass medaljen) is an award given annually by Nordlendingenes Forening, to people from Northern Norway who have distinguished themselves in their work for the region's development.

== Personal life ==
In 1871, Blix married Emma Alvilde Marie Hansen (1849–1927). They were the parents of several children including Marie Blix (1873–1920), Einar Blix (1880–1941) and illustrator Ragnvald Blix (1882–1958). Elias Blix died during 1902 and was buried at Vår Frelsers gravlund in Oslo.

== Blix Prize ==
The Blix Prize (Blix-prisen) is a literary prize awarded annually by the Norwegian publishing house Det Norske Samlaget to an outstanding author from Northern Norway who writes in Nynorsk. The award is a monetary amount from the Emma and Elias Blix Endowment. The endowment was established by Marie Blix and Einar Blix in memory of their parents, Emma and Elias Blix.

== Other sources ==
- Olsen, Kurt-Johnny (1986) Elias Blix, mannen og verket (Bodø) ISBN 82-991423-1-8
- Aschim, Anders (2008) Ein betre vår ein gong: Elias Blix: Biografi ISBN 978-82-521-6429-9
