= Salmer 1997 =

1997 supplemental hymnal of the Church of Norway

Salmer 1997 (1997 Hymns) is an official supplement to the Church of Norway's 1985 hymnal that was published in 1997. The Church Council (Norwegian: Kirkerådet) was responsible for preparing it.

The supplement contains 283 hymns and other songs, including liturgical songs and songs in Sami. Stylistically, it has a broad range of material, and the volume includes works by a number of composers and lyricists that are not represented in the 1985 hymnal. Approximately half of the songs were written after 1980; that is, after the selection for the 1985 hymnal had largely been completed. The foreword to the book states:

Salmer 1997 has a broad stylistic span, in both its language and music. Different song traditions and different forms of expression stand side by side to cover the many needs of worship and to accommodate different users.

Most strongly represented are songs from the Nordic Lutheran churches, reflected in the fact that the lyricists with the most original contributions wrote in either Norwegian or Swedish (with contributions by Svein Ellingsen, Anders Frostenson (Swedish), Britt G. Hallqvist (Swedish), Gerd Grønvold Saue, Kristin Solli Schøien, and Eyvind Skeie). However, its breadth is manifested in the fact that over 150 different lyricists and almost as many composers are represented.

In addition to the Nordic Lutheran tradition, the volume includes a wide selection of songs from the revival movement, newer songs used in youth groups, and well-known Christian children's songs. Increased international contacts between churches in Norway and the rest of the world also resulted in the inclusion of songs from churches in Latin America and Africa, among other places.
