= Norsk Salmebok (1985) =

Official hymnal of the Church of Norway (1985–2013)

Norsk Salmebok (Norwegian Hymnal), published in 1985, was the official hymnal of the Church of Norway from 1985 to 2013.

== History ==
The hymnal was approved "for use in parishes that adopt it" under a royal resolution of June 29, 1984. The hymnal replaced the 1926 and 1924 hymnals.

Work on the hymnal began in 1954. A preliminary result of this was Salmer 1973 (1973 Hymns), which introduced many new songs, such as ballads and rounds, into the church. The final draft was published as NOU 1981:40 "Norsk salmebok. Forslag til ny salmebok for Den norske kirke" (Norwegian Hymnal: A Proposal for a New Hymnal for the Church of Norway). In addition to hymns, it also contains processional songs, Bible verses, Biblical psalms (whose lyrics are Biblical verses), liturgical songs, and chanted prayers. Of the book's 810 hymns (out of total 953 items), 500 were taken from the two previous books, and 310 hymns were new material.

== Editions ==
Although the hymnal is basically common to both variants of Norwegian, there are two different editions, with covers in burgundy (Bokmål) and bottle green (Nynorsk), in which the introductory texts are in the different language variants.

In 2002, Verbum publishers issued an expanded version, titled Norsk Salmebok med bønnebok (Norwegian Hymnal with Prayer Book). The hymn selection was unchanged, but the volume was expanded with its own prayer book for daily or thematic use.

== Supplement ==
In 1997, an official supplement to the hymnal was issued, titled Salmer 1997 (1997 Hymns). In addition to more recent Norwegian hymns and liturgical songs, this also includes a selection of Sami hymns and material from Latin America, the Taizé Community, and other Christian traditions in addition to that of Norway, as well as individual pop song contributions (including songs by Bjørn Eidsvåg).

A committee appointed by the Norwegian Church prepared a complete revision of the hymnal, the result of which was the 2013 hymnal issued in November that year.

== Sami ==
The hymnal was published in a Northern Sami version in 2005, titled Sálbmagirji II. Prior to this, the 1924 hymnal and a hymnal for children had been published in Sami-language versions.
