= Norsk salmebok 2013 =

2013 hymnal book used by the Church of Norway

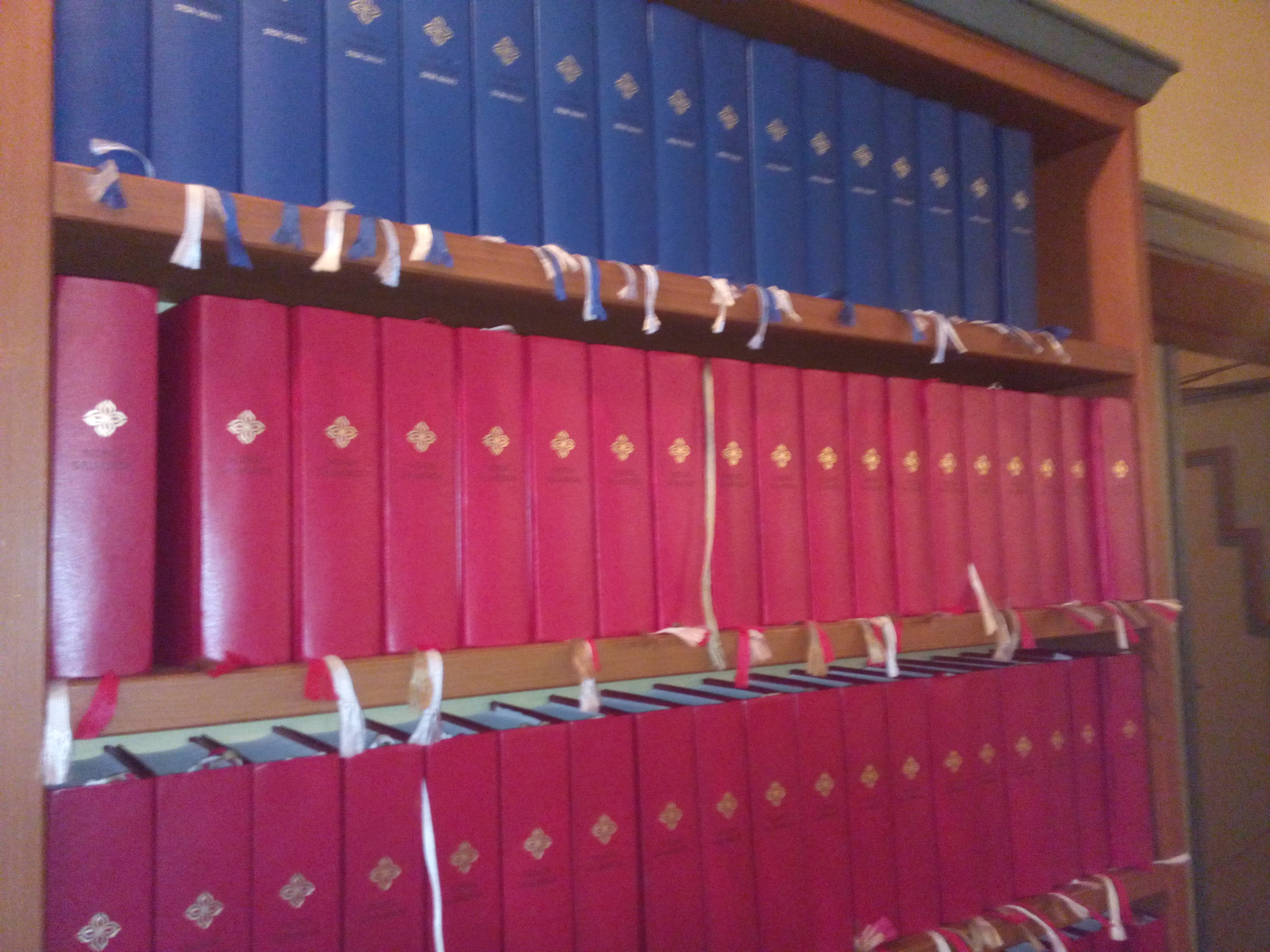
The 2013 Norwegian hymnal on a shelf at Meland Church. The red volumes are the standard edition and the blue ones are the large-print edition.

Norsk salmebok 2013: for kirke og hjem (Norwegian Hymnal 2013: For Church and Home; also known as N13) is the hymnal of the Church of Norway. It is published by Eide Forlag and was adopted for use on the first Sunday of Advent in 2013.

The book is divided into a part for hymns and a part for liturgical songs. The book includes 991 songs, including 535 hymns taken from the 1985 hymnal, 124 hymns from Salmer 1997 (1997 Hymns), and 272 new ones. The hymns in the book are in standard Norwegian, and in addition there is material in Northern Sami, Southern Sami, Lule Sami, Kven, and Norwegian dialects. There are also some songs in English and other languages.

The hymnal has a broad coverage in terms of the hymns' genres and their places and times of origin.

When the hymnal had been in use for one year, the Norwegian Broadcasting Corporation broadcast the "slow television" program Salmeboka – minutt for minutt (The Hymnal Minute by Minute) on the first Sunday of Advent in 2014. The show was a success, and 2.2 million viewers watched the 60-hour broadcast.
