= List of Norwegian women writers =

This is a list of women writers who were born in Norway or whose writings are closely associated with the country.

== A ==
- Anne Lise Aas (1925–2020), interior designer and journal editor
- Kristine Aas (1793–1863), writer and painter
- Anna Caspari Agerholt (1892–1943), women's rights activist, writer and educator, covered the history of the Norwegian women's movement
- Astrid Hjertenæs Andersen (1915–1985), early modernist poet, travel writer
- Ella Anker (1870–1958), journalist, playwright, pamphleteer
- Nini Roll Anker (1873–1942), prolific realistic novelist, playwright
- Ingeborg Arvola (born 1974), novelist, children's writer
- Elise Aubert (1837–1909), novelist, short story writer, non-fiction writer

== B ==
- Irene Ibsen Bille (1901–1985), novelist, playwright
- Inger Bråtveit (born 1978), novelist, children's writer
- Toril Brekke (born 1949), novelist, short story writer, children's writer, works on women's rights
- Hanne Bramness (born 1959), poet
- Gerd Brantenberg (born 1941), novelist, dramatist, feminist
- Elin Brodin (born 1963), novelist
- Magdalene Sophie Buchholm (1758–1825), poet, only acknowledged women writer of her times

== C ==
- Camilla Carlson (1930–1990), poet, novelist, critic
- Solveig Christov (1918–1984), novelist, short story writer, playwright
- Camilla Collett (1813–1895), novelist, feminist essayist
- Marie Colban (1814–1884), novelist, short story writer

== D ==
- Gro Dahle (born 1962), poet, children's writer
- Ingri d'Aulaire (1904–1980), English-language children's writer, together with husband Edgar Parin d'Aulaire
- Elisabeth Dored (1813–1895), novelist, author of I Loved Tiberius set in ancient Rome
- Conradine Birgitte Dunker (1780–1866), memoirist
- Astrid Sverresdotter Dypvik (born 1977), journalist, historian, non-fiction writer

== E ==
- Clara Thue Ebbell (1880–1971), young adult writer, biographer, feminist
- Marit Eikemo (born 1971), essayist, novelist, journalist, magazine editor
- Ellen Einan (1931–2013), poet, illustrator
- Rawdna Carita Eira (born 1970), Norwegian and Sámi playwright, short story writer
- Anne Karin Elstad (1938–2012), author of best-selling novels, including the four-part series on Julie
- Magli Elster (1912–1993), poet, literary critic
- Dorothe Engelbretsdatter (1634–1716), poet, Norway's first female author

== F ==
- Karin Fossum (born 1954), widely translated crime fiction writer, known as the "Norwegian queen of crime"

== G ==
- Ågot Gjems-Selmer (1858–1926), writer of works on family life, children's writer
- Beate Grimsrud (1963–2020), novelist, playwright, children's writer

== H ==
- Magnhild Haalke (1885–1984), widely recognized author of 30 works, mainly novels
- Ingeborg Refling Hagen (1895–1989), prolific novelist, children's writer, poet
- Inger Hagerup (1905–1985), poet, dramatist, anti-Nazi writings
- Marie Hamsun (1881–1969), actress, poet, children's writer, some works translated into English
- Lillemor von Hanno (1900–1984), actress, novelist, playwright
- Inger Elisabeth Hansen (born 1950), poet
- Ebba Haslund (1917–2009), novelist, short story writer, playwright, essayist, critic, author of Nothing Happened
- Torill Thorstad Hauger (1943–2014), non-fiction writer, children's writer
- Tone Hellesund (born 1967), non-fiction writer specializing in gender studies
- Vera Henriksen (1927–2016), historical novelist, playwright, non-fiction writer
- Vigdis Hjorth (born 1959), novelist, children's writer
- Tone Hødnebø (born 1962), poet
- Gunvor Hofmo (1921–1995), influential modernist poet
- Anne Holt (born 1958), best-selling, widely translated crime writer
- Åsta Holth (1904–1999), novelist, poet, short story writer
- Aslaug Høydal (1916–2007), novelist, poet, children's writer, educator
- Ida Hegazi Høyer (born 1981), novelist

== J ==
- Anna Jacobsen (1924–2004), Norwegian Sami writer, translator and publisher
- Caroline Schytte Jensen (1848–1935), songwriter, composer
- Margaret Johansen (1923–2013), novelist, short story writer, feminist
- Ragnhild Jølsen (1875–1908), reactionary writer, works on conflicts between rural society and industrial communities
- Lizzie Juvkam (1883–1869), novelist

== K ==
- Mette Karlsvik (born 1978), journalist, novelist
- Mahmona Khan (born 1973), Pakistani-Norwegian journalist, non-fiction writer
- Gustava Kielland (1800–1889), songwriter, memoirist
- Liv Køltzow (1945–2025), novelist, playwright, essayist, feminist writer
- Christiane Koren (1764–1815), poet, playwright, diarist

== L ==
- Sissel Lange-Nielsen (1931–2023), novelist, critic, journalist
- Britt Karin Larsen (born 1945), poet, novelist, works tracing the Romany people in Norway
- Trude Brænne Larssen (born 1967), novelist
- Marita Liabø (born 1971), novelist
- Tove Lie (1942–2000), poet
- Sofie Aubert Lindbæk (1875–1953), novelist, critic, educator
- Unni Lindell (born 1957), crime fiction writer, children's writer
- Hilde Lindset (born 1978), short story writer, educator
- Merethe Lindstrøm (born 1963), novelist, short story writer
- Antonie Løchen (1850–1933), children's short story writer and women's rights activist
- Cecilie Løveid (born 1951), playwright, children's writer, poem on Breivik
- Bente Lyon

== M ==
- Ragnhild Magerøy (1920–2010), historical novelist, author of the Gunhild trilogy on 19th-century rural society
- Trude Marstein (born 1973), novelist, essayist, some works translated into English
- Karin Moe (born 1945), poet, prose writer, critic
- Toril Moi (born 1953), academic works on women's writing, feminism, now based in the United States
- Anna Munch (1856–1932), novelist and playwright
- Dagne Groven Myhren (1940–2024), Norwegian literature researcher, folklorist
- Marit Myrvoll (born 1953), Sami social anthropologist, museum director

== N ==
- Marja Bål Nango (born 1988), Norwegian Sami film director and screenwriter
- Torborg Nedreaas (1906–1987), short story writer, novelist, playwright, evoking class differences
- Åse-Marie Nesse (1934–2001) philologist, poet
- Tove Nilsen (born 1952), novelist, children's writer, critic
- Anne-Pia Nygård (born 1977), autobiography in Nynorsk

== O ==
- Hanne Ørstavik (born 1969), novelist
- Sara Margrethe Oskal (born 1970), Sami writer, actress, film director
- Mari Osmundsen (born 1951), pen-name of Anne Kristine Halling, novelist, children's writer
- Sissel Benneche Osvold (born 1945), journalist
- Gunnhild Øyehaug (born 1975), poet, short story writer

== P ==
- Synnøve Persen (born 1950), Sami poet, biographer, artist
- Helvi Poutasuo (1943–2017), Finnish Sami teacher, translator and newspaper editor

== R ==
- Anne B. Ragde (born 1957), novelist, children's writer, crime fiction writer, author of Berlin Poplars
- Eva Ramm (1925–2026), psychologist, essayist, novelist, children's writer
- Juliane Rui (born 1982), poet

== S ==
- Wera Sæther (born 1945) psychologist, poet, novelist, essayist, children's writer
- Cora Sandel (1880–1974), short story writer, novelist, painter, author of the Alberta Trilogy
- Mathilde Schjøtt (1844–1926), non-fiction writer, critic, biographer, feminist
- Constance Wiel Schram (1890–1955), non-fiction writer, biographer, translator, feminist
- Åsne Seierstad (born 1970), journalist, non-fiction works including The Bookseller of Kabul
- Solfrid Sivertsen (born 1947), librarian, poet, novelist, children's writer
- Sarita Skagnes (born 1969), Indian-born women's activist, memoirist
- Amalie Skram (1846–1905), short story writer, novelist, feminist
- Kirsten Sødal (1935–2022), children's writer
- Kristin Solberg (born 1982), journalist, television reporter
- Kjersti Løken Stavrum (born 1969), journalist, editor, secretary general of the Norwegian Press Association
- Grethe Fatima Syéd (born 1968), literary scholar and novelist

== T ==
- Marie Takvam (1926–2008), poet, novelist, children's writer, actress
- Magdalene Thoresen (1819–1903), Danish-born Norwegian poet, short story writer, playwright
- Astrid Tollefsen (1897–1973), poet, lyricist
- Aadel Brun Tschudi (1909–1980), Chinese-born Norwegian geographer, sinologist
- Marit Tusvik (born 1951), poet, children's writer, playwright

== U ==
- Linn Ullmann (born 1966), journalist, novelist

== V ==
- Aslaug Vaa (1889–1965), poet, playwright
- Halldis Moren Vesaas (1907–1995), poet, children's writer, depictions of women's life
- Anne-Catharina Vestly (1920–2008), popular children's writer, widely translated
- Bjørg Vik (1935–2018), novelist, dramatist, feminist writer, some works translated into English

== W ==
- Torild Wardenær (born 1951), poet, playwright
- Herbjørg Wassmo (born 1942), poet, novelist
- Elisabeth Welhaven (1815–1901), salonist, short story writer
- Marie Wexelsen (1832–1911), poet, children's writer, novelist, hymnist

== See also ==
- List of Norwegian writers
- List of women writers
