= Nordrå =

Nordrå is a surname. Notable people with the surname include:

- Annok Sarri Nordrå (1931–2013), Swedish Sámi writer
- Grete Nordrå (1924–2012), Norwegian actress
- Olav Nordrå (1919–1994), Norwegian writer
