= Eikemo =

Eikemo is a Norwegian surname. Notable people with the surname include:

- Jon Eikemo (1939–2025), Norwegian actor
- Marit Eikemo (born 1971), Norwegian essayist, novelist, journalist and magazine editor
- Olve Eikemo (born 1973), Norwegian musician
