= Cecilie Enger =

Norwegian journalist, novelist and children's writer (born 1963)

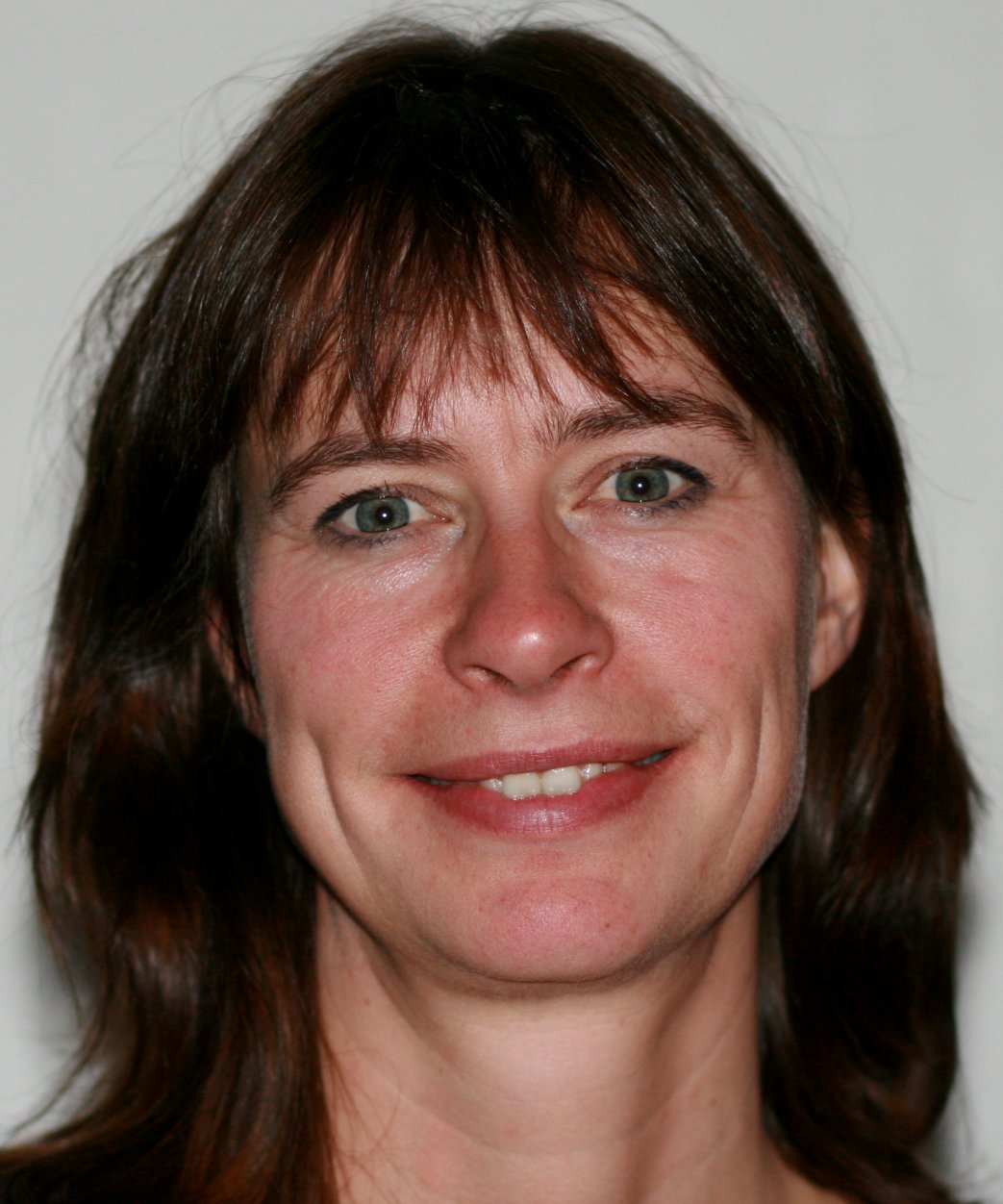
- Born: 21 February 1963 (age 63); Oslo, Norway
- Occupations: Journalist; Novelist
- Awards: Amalie Skram Prize (2008); Norwegian Booksellers' Prize (2013)

Cecilie Enger (born 21 February 1963) is a Norwegian journalist, novelist and children's writer.

She was born in Oslo. Her literary breakthrough was the novel Brødrene Henriksen from 2000. She was awarded the Norwegian Booksellers' Prize in 2013 for her autobiographical novel Mors Gaver. She was awarded the Amalie Skram Prize in 2008.

Enger works as journalist for the newspaper Dagens Næringsliv.
