= Inghill Johansen =

Norwegian writer (born 1958)

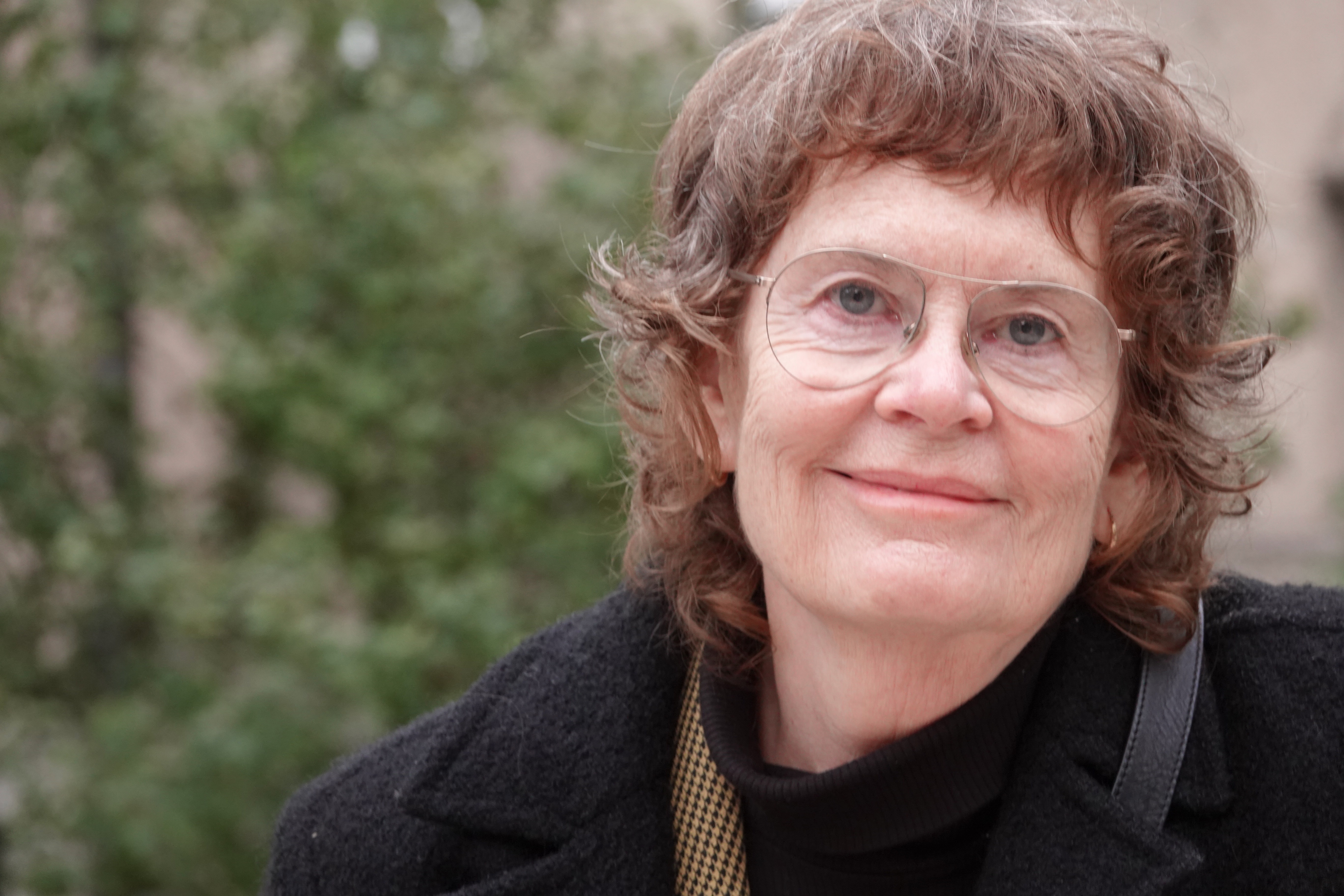
- Born: 9 June 1958 (age 68)
- Occupation: writer
- Awards: Dobloug Prize (2016); Amalie Skram Prize (2019)

Inghill Johansen (born 9 June 1958) is a Norwegian writer, mostly publishing books of prose.

== Career ==
Born on 9 June 1958, Johansen made her literary debut in 1991 with the novel Hjertehvitt. Later books include Suge (1996), Klage (2001) and Forsvinne (2009). She was awarded the Dobloug Prize in 2016. In 2019 she was awarded the Amalie Skram Prize.

Johansen lives in Heggedal in Asker and works as assistant professor and teacher.
