= Kjell Heggelund =

Norwegian writer (1932–2017)

- Born: 16 December 1932; Hamar, Norway
- Died: 8 February 2017 (aged 84)
- Occupations: Literary historian, university lecturer, magazine editor, publisher, poet, translator and literary critic
- Spouse: Liv Køltzow
- Awards: Mads Wiel Nygaard's Endowment; Norwegian Academy Prize in memory of Thorleif Dahl; Herman Wildenvey Poetry Award

Kjell Heggelund (16 December 1932 – 8 February 2017) was a Norwegian literary researcher, lecturer, editor, manager, poet, translator and literary critic.

== Personal life ==
Heggelund was born in Hamar. His parents were Kristian Heggelund and Katrine Vestby. He grew up in Tønsberg and later Bergen. He was married to Gerd Zelow Hofseth from 1956 to 1963, to Irene Olesen from 1965 to 1975, and then married the writer Liv Køltzow in 1985. He died in February 2017.

== Lyrics ==
In the 1960s Heggelund issued three poetry collections, Reisekretser (1966), I min tid (1967) and Punkt 8 (1969). His lyrics are regarded as an important contribution to the renewal of Norwegian poetry that took place in the late 1960s.

In 1971 he issued a book with translations of poems by Mao Zedong into Norwegian language, in cooperation with Tor Obrestad (Mao Tsetungs dikt). He has also translated works by the surrealists Paul Éluard, Robert Desnos, Henri Michaux and Benjamin Péret.

Heggelund co-edited the literary magazine Vinduet with Jan Erik Vold from 1970 to 1974. He co-edited the literary magazine Basar from 1975 to 1981.

== Academics and management ==
Heggelund was a lecturer and researcher at the University of Oslo from 1970 to 1992. As a researcher he has worked on the baroque and pre romantic epoques, as well as on modernist literature. He has also edited works by Petter Dass, Ludvig Holberg and Johan Herman Wessel. He wrote the chapter covering the period from 1500 to 1814 in the six-volume work Norsk Litterturhistorie from 1974.

From 1992 to 2004 Heggelund served as a literary manager at the publishing house Aschehoug.

== Awards ==
Heggelund was awarded Mads Wiel Nygaards Endowment in 1968. He received the Norwegian Academy Prize in memory of Thorleif Dahl in 1995, and the Herman Wildenvey Poetry Award in 1996.

Awards
Preceded by Knut Hauge	Recipient of the Mads Wiel Nygaard's Endowment; 1968 (together with Lars Berg)	Succeeded by Kjell Askildsen and Dag Solstad
