= Mirjam Kristensen =

Norwegian writer

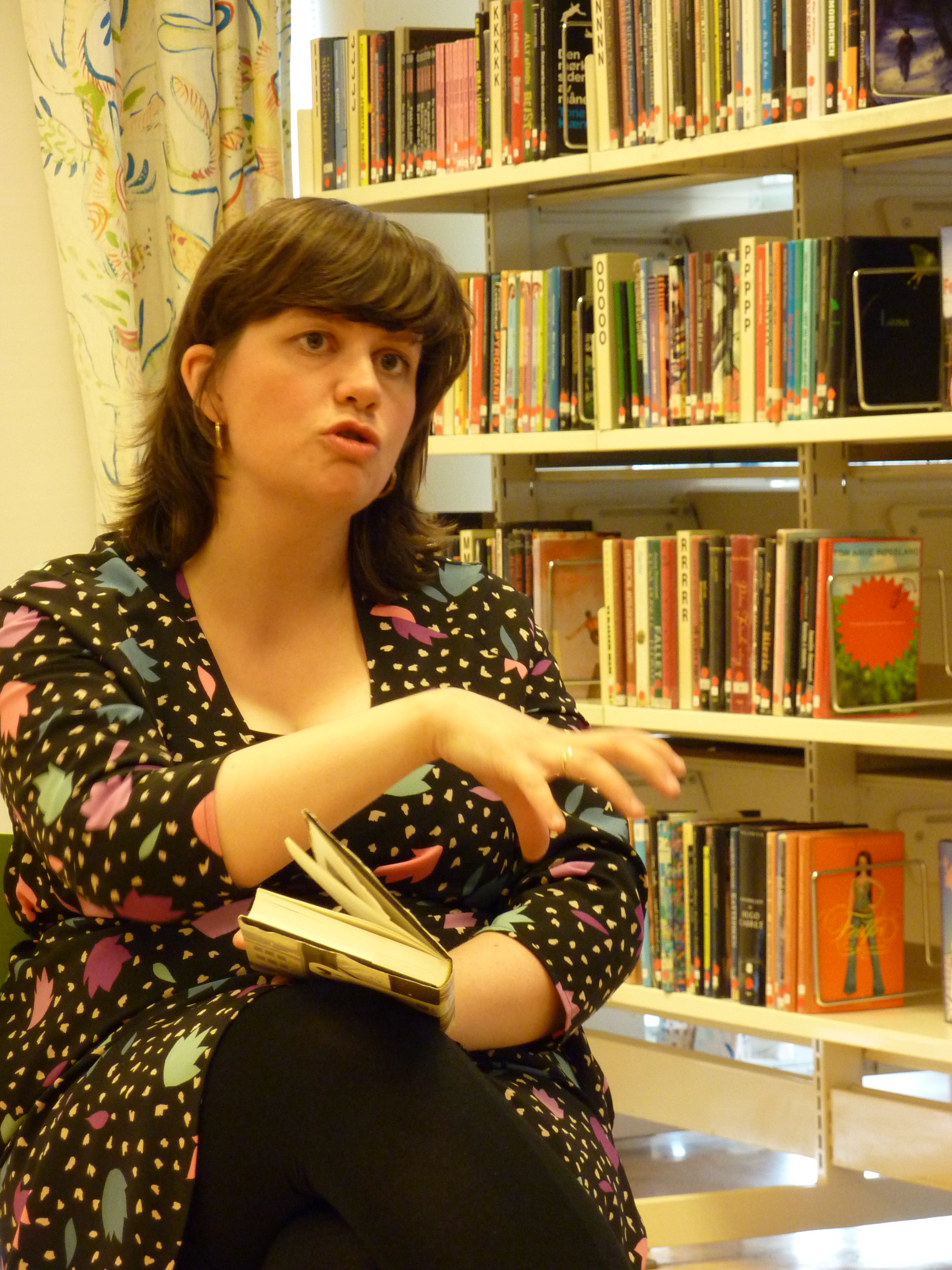
- Kristensen at a World Book Day event in 2010
- Born: 17 May 1978 (age 48); Lyngdal, Norway
- Occupation: Novelist
- Writing career
- Period: 2000–present
- Genres: Fiction, Non-fiction
- Notable awards: Tarjei Vesaas' debutantpris (2000); Amalie Skram Prize (2010)

Mirjam Kristensen (born 17 May 1978) is a Norwegian novelist and non-fiction writer. Her awards include the Tarjei Vesaas' debutantpris and the Amalie Skram Prize.

== Career ==
Born in Lyngdal Municipality on 17 May 1978, Kristensen made her literary début in 2000 with the novel Dagene er gjennomsiktige, for which she was awarded the Tarjei Vesaas' debutantpris. In 2001 she published the novel De som er ute i regnværet. She published the documentary Etter freden in 2009.

She was awarded the Amalie Skram Prize in 2010.
