= Eldrid Lunden =

Norwegian writer

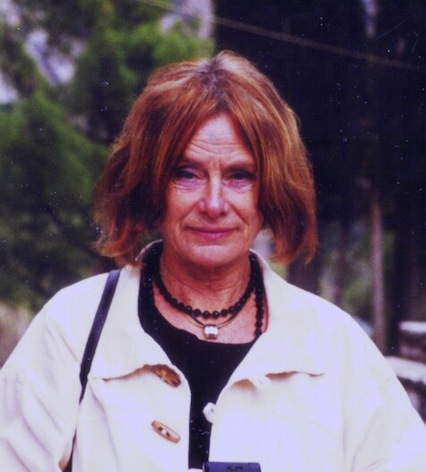
- Eldrid Lunden in Delphi, 2000
- Born: 5 October 1940 (age 85); Naustdal, Norway
- Occupations: poet, essayist
- Writing career
- Genre: Modernism
- Notable awards: Nynorsk Literature Prize (1982); Dobloug Prize (1989); Aschehougprisen (1992); Brage Prize (2000); Amalie Skram Prize (2000)

Eldrid Lunden (born 5 October 1940) is a Norwegian poet, and 1996 became Norway's first professor in creative writing, at Telemark University College. She was awarded the Dobloug Prize in 1989, and the Brage Prize honorary award in 2000. She was awarded the Amalie Skram Prize in 2000.

Lunden belonged to the circle surrounding the modernist literary magazine Profil.

She was born in Naustdal Municipality and took her cand.philol. degree at the University of Oslo. She is a sister of Kåre Lunden.

Lunden married 1994 the Swedish literary scholar and poet Reidar Ekner and lived with him in Telemark till he died 2014.

== Awards ==
- Nynorsk Literature Prize 1982
- Dobloug Prize 1989
- Aschehougprisen 1992
- Brage Prize 2000 – honorary award
- Swedish Academy Nordic Prize 2012
