= Laila Stien =

Norwegian writer and translator (born 1946)

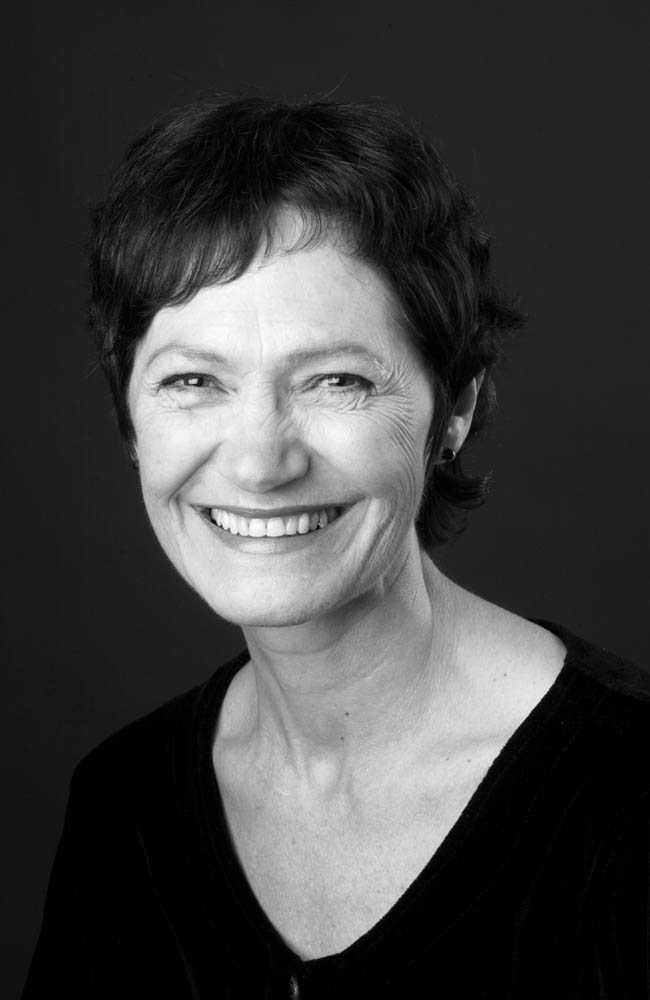
- Born: 16 May 1946 (age 80); Hemnes, Norway
- Occupations: Novelist, poet, author of children's literature and translator
- Children: Ailo Gaup
- Awards: Norwegian Critics Prize for Best children's book (1993); Aschehoug Prize (2000); Dobloug Prize (2024)

Laila Stien (born 16 May 1946) is a Norwegian novelist, poet, author of children's literature and translator from Hemnes Municipality.

== Early life ==
Born in the village of Bjerka, in Nordland on 16 May 1946, Stien grew up in Rana Municipality and later lived in Finnmark.

== Literary career ==
Stien made her literary debut in 1979 with the short stories collection Nyveien. The collection contains short stories with motives from Sami society and culture. Before her first book, she was represented with texts in the anthologies Nordfra (1975) and Nordnorge foreteller (1977). Her collections Fuglan veit (1984) and Sånt som skjer (1988) focus on family relations and everyday life.

Her literary works are often embedded with elements from Northern Norway and Sami culture. She received the Norwegian Critics Prize for Best children's book in 1993, and the Aschehoug Prize in 2000.

Stien has translated books from Sami language into Norwegian, including works by Synnøve Persen, Rauni Magga Lukkari, and Nils-Aslak Valkeapää. She has edited anthologies on modern Sami literature, including Ildstedene synger from 1984.

She was awarded the Dobloug Prize in 2024.

== Personal life ==
Her son, Ailo Gaup, is a former world champion in Freestyle Motocross.

== Selected works ==
- Nyveien (short stories; 1979)
- Fabler. Frost (poetry; 1981)
- Fuglan veit (short stories; 1984)
- Sånt som skjer (short stories; 1988)
- Hold stø båt (poetry, texts; 1990)
- I det fri (short stories; 1994)
- Vekselsang (novel; 1997)
- Gjennom glass (short stories; 1999)
- Svømmetak (short stories; 2001)
- Veranda med sol (short stories; 2003)

Children's books

- I farta (1986)
- Ole P og den merkverdige sola (1990)
- Å plukke en smørblomst (1993)
- Klar, ferdig, kjør! (1998)
- Ei jente på scooteren (1999)

== Awards ==
- Rana Municipality Cultural Prize 1986
- Språklig samling's Literary Prize 1992
- Norwegian Critics Prize for the year's best children's or youth's literature 1993, for Å plukke en smørblomst
- Havmann Prize 1999, for Gjennom glass
- Aschehoug Prize 2000
- Alta Municipality Cultural Prize 2002
- The Dobloug Prize 2024
