= Knut Hauge (writer) =

Norwegian writer

Knut Hauge (31 May 1911 – 13 April 1999) was a Norwegian writer.

Hauge was born at Vestre Slidre Municipality in Christians amt (county), Norway. He operated a farm in addition to writing a series of novels, children's books and plays. He also chaired the cultural society Noregs Ungdomslag from 1955 to 1959.

His first novel was Krossen under Torfinnshø in 1948, and his last novel was Prolog til ei svunnen tid in 1989. In 1965, Hauge won the Sunnmørsprisen for his novel, Kross og kvitsymre. He was awarded the Mads Wiel Nygaard's Endowment (Mads Wiel Nygaards legat) in 1967, Aschehoug Prize (Aschehougprisen) in 1977 and Dobloug Prize (Doblougprisen) in 1986.

Knut Hauge died during 1999. A bust of Hauge was installed at the Valdres Folkemuseum in Nord-Aurdal Municipality in Oppland county during 2007. The sculpture was designed by artist Laila Olava Unhjem and Knut Olav Dokken from Vestre Slidre Municipality.

== Selected works ==
- Ulfssønene (1969)
- Tidevatn (1971)
- Spelemann Siljufløyt (1973)
- Einsame ulvar (1975)
- Juvet (1978)
- Enno ein vår (1980)

Cultural offices
Preceded by Vegard Sletten	Chairman of Noregs Ungdomslag; 1955–1959	Succeeded by
Awards
Preceded by Torborg Nedreaas	Recipient of the Mads Wiel Nygaard's Endowment; 1967	Succeeded by Lars Berg and Kjell Heggelund
Preceded by Karin Bang	Recipient of the Aschehoug Prize; 1977	Succeeded by Olav H. Hauge
