= Espen Haavardsholm =

Norwegian writer

- Born: 10 February 1945 (age 81); Oslo, Norway
- Occupations: novelist, poet, essayist and biographer
- Spouses: Liv Køltzow (m. 1966; div. 1973) Tone Torgersen (m. 1975–1979) Francesca Maria Nichols (m. 1982)
- Relatives: Martin Linge (grandfather)

Espen Haavardsholm (born 10 February 1945) is a Norwegian novelist, poet, biographer and essayist.

== Life and career ==
Born in Oslo on 10 February 1945, Haavardsholm is a son of psychologist Borger Haavardsholm and psychiatrist Kari Vogt Linge. His maternal grandfather was Martin Linge. He was married to Liv Køltzow from 1966 to 1972, to Tone Torgersen from 1975 to 1979, and to Francesca Maria Nichols from 1982.

He made his literary debut in 1966 with the collection of short stories, Tidevann. He was one of the central writers in the modernist literary magazine Profil. He has written biographies on Martin Linge (his grandfather), Aksel Sandemose and Johan Borgen.

== Awards ==
- Gyldendal's Endowment 1970
- Aschehoug Prize 2006.
