= Profil (literary magazine) =

Norwegian literary magazine

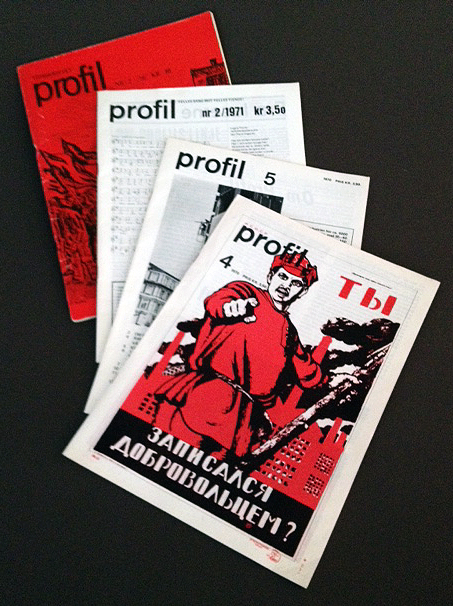
Profil in the 1970s

Profil was a Norwegian literary magazine which had great influence in the late 1960s and the 1970s. The magazine was founded in 1938 as Filologen, a house organ for the Faculty of Humanities at the University of Oslo. Its name was changed to Profil in 1959. In 1966 the magazine was taken over by a group of radical students. They opposed established literary views, and introduced the modernist literature. The circle of writers that emerged are often referred to as the "Profil Generation".

== Modernism ==
Among the contributors to the magazine were Jan Erik Vold, Dag Solstad, Tor Obrestad, Espen Haavardsholm, Eldrid Lunden, Liv Køltzow, Paal-Helge Haugen, Einar Økland and Stein Mehren. Realistic novels and symbolist poetry were attacked, while modernist literature was introduced and supported. In addition, the magazine was employed as a forum to discuss modernism and Marxism.

== Political period ==
Between 1959 and 1966 Profil was a student magazine. In 1966 the magazine's editorial board was taken over by a literary group who named themselves as a new generation of modernists.

From 1968 and onwards several of the Profil writers became politically left wing activists, and started writing political poems, songs and novels. Examples of so-called working class literature are Obrestad's poetry collection Vårt daglege brød (1968), Haavardsholm's novel Zink (1971), Solstad's novel Arild Asnes 1970 (1971) and Obrestad's novel Sauda! Streik! (1972). Liv Køltzow's novel Hvem bestemmer over Bjørg og Unni? (1972) is regarded as Norway's first example of militant and socialist feminism.

Profil became a forum for Maoists in the country from 1970 to 1981.

== Song books ==
The Profil songbooks were eight books issued 1972–1975, subtitled Songar frå folkets kamp.

== Post-modernism ==
The magazine disappeared in 1981. It was relaunched in 1984 as a general cultural magazine and was closed in 1989. Some of the most profiled political writers from the 1970s later concluded that the working class literature experiment was a failure.
