= Ailo Gaup (motocross rider) =

Norwegian motocross rider (born 1979)

Ailo Mikkelsen Gaup
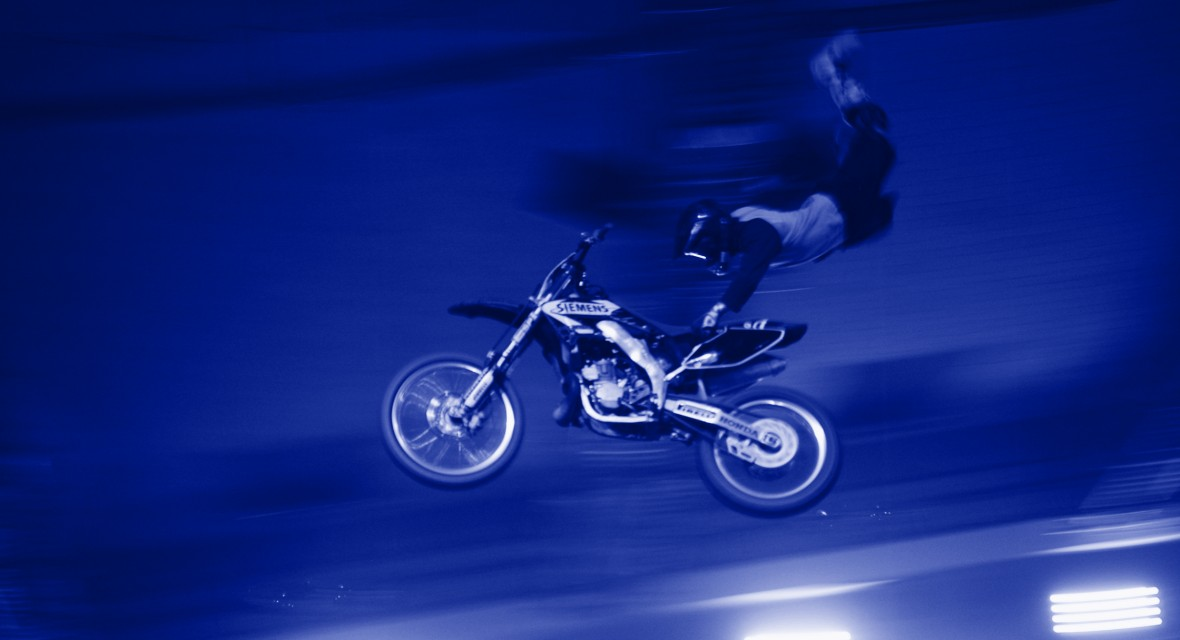
- Freestyle Motocross
- Born: 22 January 1979 (age 47); Tromsø, Norway
- Occupation: Motorbike rider
- Known for: IFMXF World Champion 2007

Ailo Mikkelsen Gaup (born 22 January 1979) is a former Norwegian Freestyle Motocross rider, who invented the Underflip. Gaup has won the world title in FMX. Gaup originally started his career competing in motocross, but switched to FMX competitions. He announced his retirement in October 2009.

== Early years ==
Gaup was born in Tromsø, Norway to parents Mikkel Aslaksen Gaup and author Laila Stien and grew up there and in the village of Máze (Masi) in Kautokeino Municipality in Finnmark. His family moved to Alta Municipality when Ailo was fourteen years old. As a ten-year-old, he sold fish and painted houses to be able to buy a mini-motorcycle and began motocross cycling. As a sixteen-year-old, he moved to the capital of Oslo to enroll in the motocross line at The Norwegian College of Elite Sport in Bærum Municipality.

== Career ==
Today, Gaup lives in Kongsberg Municipality, where he has been located since 2000. He started competing in freestyle motocross in 1999 and won the Norwegian Championship. In 2002, Gaup entered his first international freestyle motocross contest and ended up second overall at his first World Cup contest.

Gaup was the first European to perform a backflip on a motorcycle, in 2003. He was also the first European do long distance backflips, a year later. In November 2004, Gaup invented the Underflip, which is a sideways flip on a motorcycle. It took almost two years until anyone else was able to perform this trick. The Underflip has later been copied by riders all over the world. Gaup has to date won six Norwegian Championships in two different sports, motocross and freestyle motocross/FMX, and won the World Cup in 2003 and 2004. He was crowned World Cup Champion in FMX in 2004 and again in 2007, making him the only rider to win the World Championships in freestyle motocross twice. He has stated that in spite of his profession, he is scared of heights. On 17 November 2007, he became the first Norwegian and the first Sámi to win a gold medal in FMX.

As many of his relatives, Gaup has also done some acting. He played Ryzard, a gymnast in a small circus in the movie "Dobbel Salto" in 2005. He also plays the young version of the main character Eivind, in "Jernanger".
