= Amalie Skram Prize =

Norwegian literary award

The Amalie Skram Prize (Norwegian: Amalie Skram-prisen) is a Norwegian literature prize established by the Amalie Skram society in Bergen in 1994. The prize is given to a female writer of fiction in the spirit of author and women's rights pioneer Amalie Skram, and awarded on Skram's birthday on 22 August. The prize consists of a diploma illustrated by Ingri Egeberg, and a travel stipend.

== Prize winners ==
- 1994: Liv Køltzow
- 1995: Bergljot Hobæk Haff
- 1996: Bjørg Vik
- 1997: Herbjørg Wassmo
- 1998: Cecilie Løveid
- 1999: Marit Tusvik
- 2000: Eldrid Lunden
- 2001: Britt Karin Larsen
- 2002: Hanne Ørstavik
- 2003 Merete Morken Andersen
- 2004: Toril Brekke
- 2005: Margaret Skjelbred
- 2006: Torunn Ystaas
- 2007: Linn Ullmann
- 2008: Cecilie Enger
- 2009: Ragnhild Nilstun
- 2010: Mirjam Kristensen
- 2011: Tove Nilsen
- 2012: Merethe Lindstrøm
- 2013: Karin Fossum
- 2014: Vigdis Hjorth
- 2015: Helga Flatland
- 2016: Gøhril Gabrielsen
- 2017: Marit Eikemo
- 2018: Aasne Linnestå
- 2019: Inghill Johansen
- 2020: Brit Bildøen
- 2021: Sumaya Jirde Ali
- 2022: Ingvild H. Rishøi
- 2023: Trude Marstein
- 2024: Olaug Nilssen
- 2025: Gunnhild Øyehaug
