= Lars Berg =

Norwegian writer (1901-1969)

Lars Kornelius Edvard Berg (16 May 1901 – 11 January 1969) was a Norwegian teacher, novelist, short story writer and playwright.

He was born at on the island of Kvaløya as the son of fisherman and farmer Emil Larsen Berg and Olufine Johansen, and grew up on a small farm. From 1947 he was married to Aud Norvåg. He died at Kvaløya in January 1969.

He graduated from the teachers' college in Tromsø in 1922, and worked as a teacher in Bø Municipality from 1922 to 1923, Ørsta Municipality from 1923 to 1924, and Hillesøy Municipality from 1924 to 1934. He later worked as a headmaster at a school in Tromsøysund Municipality from 1940 to 1967. He made his literary debut in 1934 with the novel Men det var det ingen som visste, and followed it up with Du er den første kvinne in 1935. Berg was influenced by ideas from Freud's psychoanalysis. His candid treatment of sexuality-related problems in the first two novels led to strong reactions and initiated a spirited cultural debate in the late 1930s. His next two novels were Du skal svare (1936) and Fire søsken går ut (1937). In the late 1930s, he also published a number of short stories in the periodical Arbeidermagasinet.

During the occupation of Norway by Nazi Germany Berg was a member of the resistance movement in Troms. He was arrested in 1942 and incarcerated at the Grini concentration camp. Among his post-war novels are Kvinna og havet from 1950, Vi må ro i natt from 1951, and Den lange vegen from 1967. He was an advocate for theatre in Northern Norway for many years, and is given credit for the establishment of Hålogaland Teater (after his death). His first play was Maria, about a rehabilitation center for young girls off the straight path. The play was staged at Det Norske Teatret in April 1959, directed by Dagmar Myhrvold, with Elisabeth Bang as "Maria", the headmistress, and Liv Thorsen as the young girl "Tora". The play was also adapted into an audio play for Radioteatret. His play Petter Dass was later performed at Hålogaland Teater. Berg was awarded Mads Wiel Nygaards Endowment in 1968 (shared with Kjell Heggelund).

Awards
Preceded by Knut Hauge	Recipient of the Mads Wiel Nygaard's Endowment; 1968 (together with Kjell Heggelund)	Succeeded by Kjell Askildsen and Dag Solstad
