= Cecilie Løveid =

Norwegian writer (born 1951)

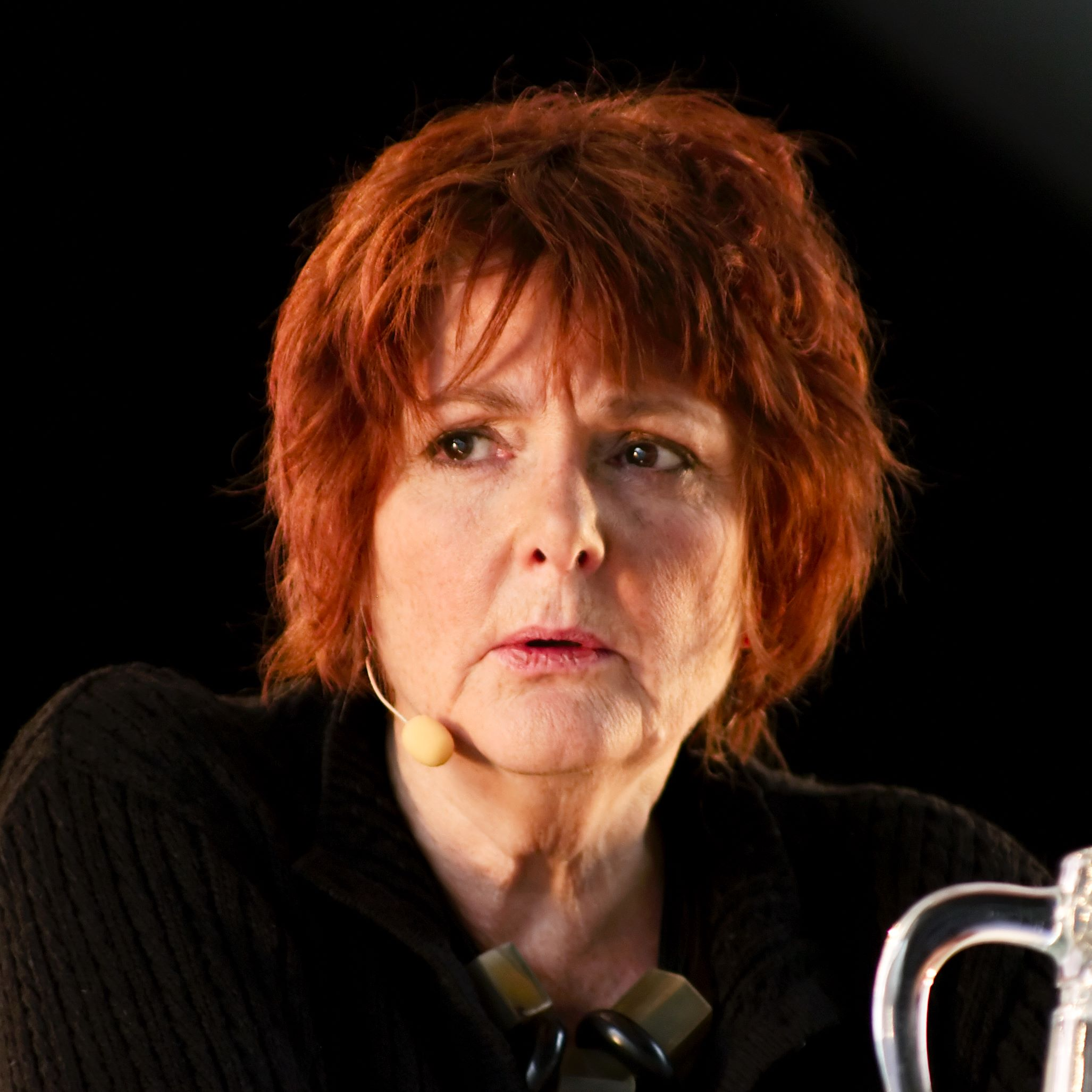
- Born: 21 August 1951 (age 75); Mysen, Norway
- Occupations: Novelist; Poet; Playwright; Children's writer
- Awards: Gyldendal's Endowment; Prix Italia; Aschehoug Prize; Dobloug Prize; Ibsen Prize

Cecilie Løveid (born 21 August 1951) is a Norwegian novelist, poet, playwright, and writer of children's books.

== Personal life ==
Løveid was born in Mysen to ship's captain Erik Løveid and actress Ingrid Cecilie Meyer. She had a cohabiting relationship with musician Bjørn Ianke.

== Career ==
Løveid made her literary debut in 1972, with the novel Most. She received the Gyldendal Prize in 2001. Løveid's first play was the one-act Tingene, tingene, published in the literary magazine Vinduet in 1976. In total she has written about thirty plays, librettos or other texts for radio or stage performance.

In 2013 the poem "Punishment" (Straff) was printed in Aftenposten, as "This Week's Poem", on 8 April. In an interview with the newspaper she said that the poem is about Breivik, and that she has no opinion about the verdict of his trial—because that is outside the scope of the poem. The poem starts with "I am glad that he got the punishment that he got. As [it is] known, he will be led by the hand, from grave to grave." It ends with "Therefore, and even if he does all of this, it will be calm/quiet."

She was awarded the Amalie Skram Prize in 1998.

== Awards ==
- Gyldendal's Endowment 1979 (shared with Wera Sæther)
- Prix Italia 1982
- Aschehoug Prize 1984
- Dobloug Prize 1990 (Shared with Johannes Heggland)
- Ibsen Prize 1999
- Gyldendal Prize 2001
- Brage Prize, open class 2017

Awards
Preceded by Olav Nordrå and Arne Ruste	Recipient of the Gyldendal's Endowment; 1979 (shared with Wera Sæther)	Succeeded by Tormod Haugen and Marta Schumann
Preceded by Gudny Ingebjørg Hagen; Malgorzata Piotrowska	Recipient of the Brage Prize, open class 2017	Succeeded by Anja Røyne
