= Marta Schumann =

Norwegian writer (1919–1994)

Marta Schumann (4 February 1919 – 24 April 1994) was a Norwegian novelist, poet and short story writer. She made her literary début in 1969 with the historical novel Korset under Skuggefjellet, the first part of a trilogy set in the 18th century. She was awarded the Gyldendal's Endowment in 1980.

== Personal life ==
Schumann was born in Valldal on 4 February 2019. She was the daughter of farmer and agronomist Petter Gerhard Monssøn Myklebust and farmer and schoolteacher Berta Monsdatter Vaagenes Engeset. She married Einar von der Fehr Schumann in 1941.

Schumann died in Molde on 24 April 1994.

Awards
Preceded by Cecilie Løveid and Wera Sæther	Recipient of the Gyldendal's Endowment; 1980 (shared with Tormod Haugen)	Succeeded by Gidske Anderson and Stein Mehren
