= Kåre Lunden =

Norwegian historian

Kåre Lunden (8 April 1930 – 18 July 2013) was a Norwegian historian, and Professor Emeritus of History at the University of Oslo.

Lunden was born in Naustdal Municipality. He originally studied agronomy at the Norwegian College of Agriculture, graduating in 1957. He then worked six years as a civil servant in the Norwegian Ministry of Church Affairs and Education, before taking up history studies. There he graduated as cand.philol. in 1965. He was appointed by the King-in-Council as Professor of History at the University of Oslo in 1976.

He is a member of the Norwegian Academy of Science and Letters.

He was an able javelin thrower while studying. He represented the sports team of the Norwegian College of Agriculture, NLHI, and threw 50.27 metres in 1954.

He was a brother of poet Eldrid Lunden.

== Selected bibliography ==
- Norge under Sverre-ætten, volume 3 of Cappelens Norgeshistorie, 1976
- Biletet av fortida: innhogg i historisk fagteori, 1991
- Norsk grålysing, 1992
- Den vakre snikkarkona: frå Geoffrey Chaucers Canterbury-forteljingar og andre mellomaldervers (ed.), 1992
- Nasjon eller union? Refleksjonar og røynsler, 1993
- Dialog med fortida. Historie om .., 1995
- Norges Landbrukshistorie, volume 2, 2002
