= Sigurd Berge =

Norwegian composer (1929–2002)

Sigurd Berge (1 July 1929 – 1 February 2002) was a Norwegian composer.

He graduated in 1952, then studied at the Music Conservatory in Oslo. He studied modern electronic music in Copenhagen and Utrecht. Groundbreaking "modern music" pieces from late 50's to early 80's including Hornlokk (1972) and Illuxit (1974). He was the president of the Norsk Komponistforening (Society of Norwegian Composers) from 1985 to 1988. He wrote multiple books and articles about creative use of music.

In 1970 Berge collaborated with artist Irma Salo Jæger and poet Jan Erik Vold to create Norway's first multimedia artwork, Blikk (artwork), which was exhibited at Henie Onstad Kunstsenter. Blikk is now part of the permanent collection of National Museum of Norway, having been recreated by composer and curator Jøran Rudi in 2022.

== Production ==
=== Selected works ===
- Pezzo orchestrale (1959)
- Episode (1959)
- Sinus (1959)
- Raga for oboe and orchestra (1959)
- Chroma (1963).
- The raindrop postlude (1968)
- Moon landscape (1971)
- Hornlokk (1972), written for Frøydis Ree Wekre
- Illuxit (1974) for children’s choir
- Juvenes (1976) for string orchestra
- Trio for tre horn (1986) for Hot Lips Trio
- Mørk maske (1995)

=== Discography ===
- Early Electronic Works, Prisma Records, (2010)

=== Installation artworks ===
- Blikk (1970, 2022)
