= Blikk (artwork) =

Norwegian installation artwork

- Artist: Irma Salo Jæger, Sigurd Berge and Jan Erik Vold
- Year: 1970, 2022
- Movement: Kinetic sculpture, electronic literature
- Location: National Museum of Art, Architecture and Design, Oslo
- Accession: 2022
- Website: www.nasjonalmuseet.no/en/guide/collection/80/247

Blikk (in English: "Glance" or "The Gaze") is a Norwegian installation artwork first created in 1970 by artist Irma Salo Jæger, composer Sigurd Berge and poet Jan Erik Vold. After being recreated in 2022 by composer and curator Jøran Rudi it is now part of the permanent collection of the Norwegian National Museum.

== About the work ==
Blikk is the first multimodal artwork in Norway and is also an example of early electronic literature. The artists referred to the work as a sensual and perceptual experiment resulting in a fusing of poetry, music and kinetic sculpture. Artist Irma Salo Jæger, composer Sigurd Berge and poet Jan Erik Vold were commissioned by the Henie Onstad Kunstsenter in 1969 to create a work using sound, light and motion.

Irma Jæger's sculpture was the visual focus of the work. Five large metal frames formed cubes that move around a central hub. Transparent sheets with colourful geometric patterns were slotted into the frames, and lights shone through them causing colourful shadows to be cast on the ceiling and walls as the cubes move.

The soundscape combines poet Jan Erik Vold's voice, reading his poetry, with electro-acoustic compositions by composer Sigurd Berge. Berge combined synthetic sounds with recordings from nature and Vold's readings.

The installation is named for Vold's poem Blikket. Vold's reading of the poem provides part of the soundtrack for the exhibition. The poem only includes the five words BLIKKET DU FANGER IKKE MEG (in English: "GAZE YOU WON'T CATCH ME"), which are moved around to form different meanings with each line of the poem:

BLIKKET DU FANGER IKKE MEG

BLIKKET DU FANGER MEG IKKE

BLIKKET DU IKKE MEG FANGER

The poem was originally conceptualised in 1964, inspired by Swedish concrete poetry. It was published in 1966 as Blikket, displaying various combinations of the words across 32 pages:

== Exhibitions in 1990 and 2005-2007 ==
The 1969 exhibition was almost forgotten, but in 1990 a simplified version toured the Nordic countries as part of an exhibition of 1960s Nordic art. A version of this was also exhibited at the Museum of Contemporary Art in Oslo in 2005–2007.

== Permanent installation (2022) ==
The installation was recreated by composer and curator Jøran Rudi for the reopening of the National Museum of Norway in 2022, and is now a permanent part of the museum's collection. A reviewer for Morgenbladet noted that it was one of very few kinetic art works in the museum, and that it was a complex installation for its time that reaches many of our senses simultaneously.
