= Wera Sæther =

Norwegian psychologist, poet, novelist, essayist and writer

- Born: 19 May 1945 (age 81)
- Occupations: Psychologist and writer
- Awards: Gyldendal's Endowment ( 1979); Dobloug Prize ( 1996); Ossietzky Award ( 1999)

Wera Sæther (born 19 May 1945) is a Norwegian psychologist, poet, novelist, essayist, writer of books for youth and of documentary books. She made her literary debut in 1974 with the poetry collection Barnet og brødet. Sæther was awarded the Gyldendal's Endowment in 1979 (shared with Cecilie Løveid). She was awarded the Dobloug Prize in 1996.

== Books ==
- Barnet og brødet – poems (1973)
- Mellom stumheten og ordet – documentary (1974)
- Kvinnen, kroppen og angsten – (1974)
- Der lidelse blir samfunn – prose (1975)
- Barnet, døden og dansen – prose (1978)
- Lovet være du, søster Brød – documentary (1979)
- Vei – novel (1980)
- Hvit sol – documentary (1983)
- Comiso, en klage – poems (1984)
- Sol over gode og onde – prose (1985)
- Afrika, Ordfrika og andre hemmeligheter – children's book (1986)
- Kjærlighetssang – poems (1986)
- Vi overlever ikke alt – documentary (1987)
- Fravær nærvær – poems (1987)
- Rommet med det rare i – documentary (1988)
- Berøring forbudt – documentary (1988)
- Jeg tar asken og går – poems (1989)
- I lys av døden – documentary (1992)
- I Naomis hus – documentary (1993)
- Kan kamelene synge? – documentary (1994)
- A for ansikt – novel (1994)
- Rwandas øyne – documentary (1994)
- Gudinnen med det skinnende sverdet – children's book (1995)
- Ruts bok 1989 – novel (1995)
- Maisbarnebarna – documentary (1996)
- Det uhørte Guatemala – (1997)
- Om mitt hode var vann – novel (1997)
- Denne krukken er knust – novel (1998)
- Støvets sønn – novel (1998)
- Adresse i vinden. Indiske reiser – essays (1999)
- Brent barn – novel (2000)
- Saras reise – children's book (2001)
- En annen dato et annet sted – essay (2002)
- Umas øyne – children's book (2004)
- MammaRitaHuset – barnebok (2006)
- En annens navn i munnen – novel (2009)
- Rett Øst – poems (2009)
- Mannen og datteren – novel (2010)
- Ukjent fugl – documentary (2012)
- Barnet, døden og dansen; Lovet være du, søster Brød – poems (2015)
- Se Europa – novel (2017)
- Lavlandet – novel (2018)
- Tango med Elisa – novel (2021)

== Prizes ==
- Gyldendals legat, 1979
- Doblougprisen, 1996
- Ossietzky Prize, 1999
- Norwegian Authors Union Freedom of Expression Prize, 2012

Awards
| Preceded by Olav Nordrå and Arne Ruste | Recipient of the Gyldendal's Endowment; 1979 (shared with Cecilie Løveid) | Succeeded by Tormod Haugen and Marta Schumann |
