= Idar Kristiansen =

Norwegian writer

Idar Kristiansen (26 May 1932, Honningsvåg – 10 January 1985) was a Norwegian poet, novelist, short story writer and non-fiction writer. He made his literary debut in 1957 with the poetry collection Sanger fra en tundra. His main work is a tetralogy on the Finnish immigration to Finnmark, Kornet og fiskene (1978–1981).

He was awarded the Aschehoug Prize in 1980.
