= Aschehoug Prize =

Norwegian literature award

The Aschehoug Prize is published annually by the Norwegian publishing house Aschehoug. The Aschehoug Prize is awarded to Norwegian authors on the basis of the merit of a recent publication. It is awarded on merit, irrespective of the publisher, based on a binding recommendation from the Norwegian Critics Organization. The prize consists of a statuette of sculptor Ørnulf Bast and 100,000 kroner (2018). The monumental sculpture Evig Liv (=Eternal Life) which is the reference of the miniature statuette is to be found at Sehesteds plass in front of the publisher's main building in Oslo.

== Recipients of the Aschehoug Prize ==
- 1973 – Stein Mehren
- 1974 – Bjørg Vik
- 1975 – Kjartan Fløgstad
- 1976 – Karin Bang
- 1977 – Knut Hauge
- 1978 – Olav H. Hauge
- 1979 – Ernst Orvil and Tor Åge Bringsværd
- 1980 – Idar Kristiansen
- 1981 – Jan Erik Vold
- 1982 – Kjell Erik Vindtorn
- 1983 – Arnold Eidslott
- 1984 – Cecilie Løveid
- 1985 – Edvard Hoem
- 1986 – Rolf Jacobsen
- 1987 – Finn Carling
- 1988 – Einar Økland
- 1989 – Bergljot Hobæk Haff
- 1990 – Erling Kittelsen
- 1991 – Kjell Askildsen
- 1992 – Eldrid Lunden
- 1993 – Jan Kjærstad
- 1994 – Inger Elisabeth Hansen
- 1995 – Lars Amund Vaage
- 1996 – Tor Fretheim
- 1997 – Jon Fosse
- 1998 – Gro Dahle
- 1999 – Øyvind Berg
- 2000 – Laila Stien
- 2001 – Ole Robert Sunde
- 2002 – Ellen Einan
- 2003 – Steinar Opstad
- 2004 – Dag Solstad
- 2005 – Hans Herbjørnsrud
- 2006 – Espen Haavardsholm
- 2007 – Hanne Ørstavik
- 2008 – Paal-Helge Haugen
- 2009 – Thure Erik Lund
- 2010 – Anne Oterholm
- 2011 – Bjørn Sortland
- 2012 – Ragnar Hovland
- 2013 – Erlend Loe
- 2014 – Geir Gulliksen
- 2015 – Vigdis Hjorth
- 2016 – Per Petterson
- 2017 – Øyvind Rimbereid
- 2018 – Liv Køltzow
- 2019 – Johan Harstad
- 2020 – no award
- 2021 - Karin Haugane
- 2022 - Linn Ullmann
- 2023 - Ingvar Ambjørnsen
