= Margaret Skjelbred =

Norwegian writer (born 1949)

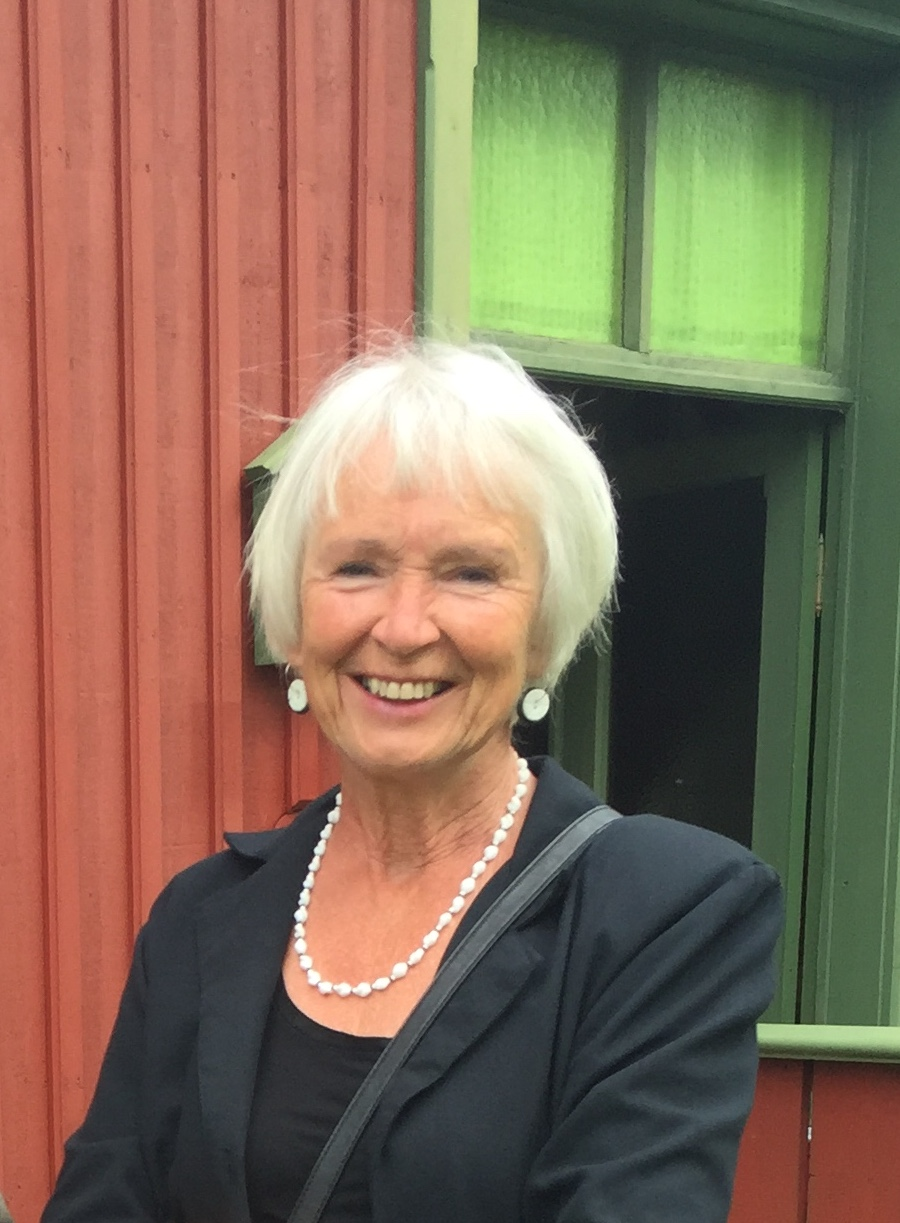
- Born: 25 January 1949 (age 77); Stokke, Norway
- Occupation: Writer
- Awards: Prøysenprisen (1989); Amalie Skram Prize (2005)

Margaret Skjelbred (born 25 January 1949) is a Norwegian poet, children's writer, novelist and short story writer. Her awards include Prøysenprisen and the Amalie Skram Prize.

== Early life and education ==
Born in Stokke on 25 January 1949, Skjelbred grew up in a family with five children, belonging to a pietist society where her father was a lay preacher. In their home they had no books except the Bible and the house postil. She graduated as nurse in 1970, and specialized in mental health.

== Career ==
While still working as a nurse, Skjelbred made her literary debut in 1983, with the poetry collection Det er åleine du er. Further collections are Skilderier from 1985, and Bakkesøte, øyentrøst (1989). She was awarded the Prøysen Prize in 1989.

From 1990 she became a full-time writer. The children's book Tom og Andersen (1993) was the first in a series of five books. Her poetry collection Du smiler mot meg med et falmet bilde (1994) is illustrated with photographies by Morten Krogvold, and the collection Ved Jakobs løe (1995) is illustrated by Hans Gerhard Sørensen. Her novel Lerkehjerter from 1997 is set in rural Vestfold in the early 1900s. It was the first in a trilogy, the two next novels were titled Vildresinn (1998) and Alvemål (1999). Her novel Gulldronning, perledronning came in 2004. In 2005 she was awarded the Amalie Skram Prize. The autobiographical novel Mors bok from 2009 deals with growing up in a Haugean family. In her novel Du skal elske lyset (2011) the protagonist Alva is an old woman looking back on a joyful childhood which turned into darkness when her father died in an accident. Alva and her mother then have to move in with her grandparents on their small farm, where her grandfather rules the house in the spirit of strong pietistic Lutheranism. Her first short story collection was Hadde jeg vinger from 2019, with childhood stories from the 1950s and 1960s.
