= Ragnar Vold =

Norwegian journalist (1906–1967)

- Born: 22 November 1906; Kristiansund, Norway
- Died: 16 June 1967 (aged 60); Oslo, Norway
- Occupations: Journalist, non-fiction writer and novelist
- Spouse: Sogrid Marie Johanna Wilhelmsen (1937–1967; his death)
- Children: Jan Erik Vold
- Parent(s): William Benjamin Hansen Vold (father); Helga Askevold (mother)

Ragnar Vold (22 November 1906 – 16 June 1967) was a Norwegian journalist, non-fiction writer and novelist.

He was born in Kristiansund as a son of William Benjamin Hansen Vold (1874–1943) and Helga Askevold (1875–1930), both teachers. He was a grandnephew of Anders Askevold. In May 1937 in Vestre Aker he married nurse Sigrid Marie Johanna Wilhelmsen (1913–1992), a granddaughter of Lars Aagaard Meyer. They had the son Jan Erik Vold, a poet.

During the 1930s he was a correspondent for the newspaper Dagbladet, and was among the Norwegian journalists who most explicitly warned about the emergence of Nazism in Germany. From 1945 he edited the foreign affairs section of Dagbladet. He was a minor ballot candidate for the Liberal Party in the 1953 election.

He died at the age of 60, in Oslo.

== Select works ==
- Tyskland marsjerer – hvorfor? – hvorhen?. 1934.
- Mennesket søker fotfeste. 1939.
- Dagbladet i Tigerstaden. 1949.
- Dagbladet i krig og fred 1930–1954. 1968. (completed by Reidar Anthonsen)
- Motstand: artikler i Dagbladet 1930–1945. 2006. (collected by Jan Erik Vold)
