= Jan Erik Vold =

Norwegian writer, jazz vocal reciter, and translator (born 1939)

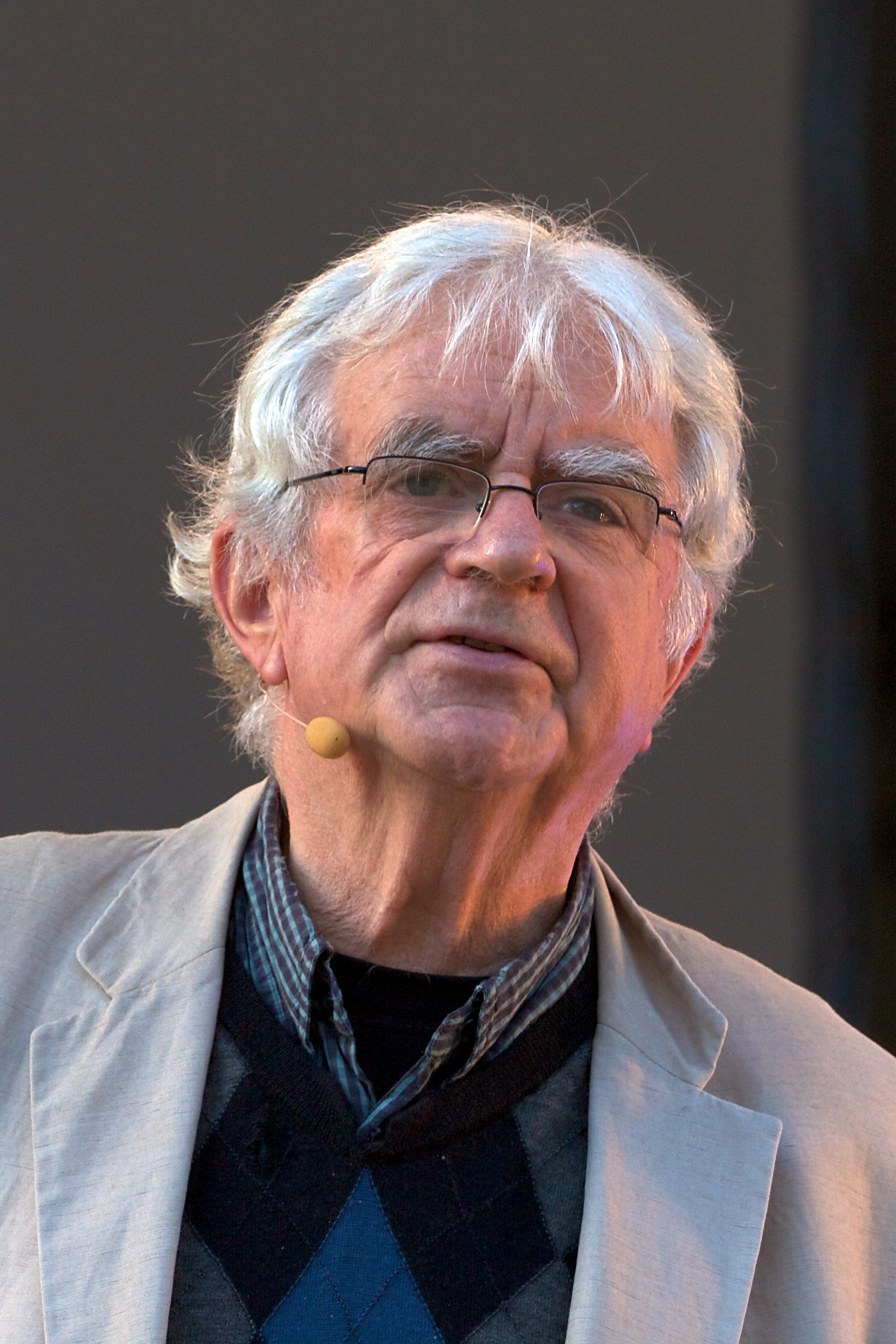
- Vold in 2010
- Born: 18 October 1939 (age 86); Oslo, Norway
- Occupations: Lyric poet Jazz vocal reciter Translator; Author
- Relatives: Ragnar Vold (father)
- Writing career
- Period: 1965–present
- Genres: Biography; Non-fiction; Poetry; Poems; Anthologies

Jan Erik Vold (born 18 October 1939) is a Norwegian lyric poet, reciter, translator and author. He was a member of the so-called "Profil generation", the circle attached to the literary magazine Profil. Throughout his career, he has contributed to modernist Norwegian poetry. Jan Erik Vold is currently living in Stockholm.

He was born in Oslo, the son of journalist Ragnar Vold.

== Career ==
He has won numerous awards, including the 1965 Tarjei Vesaas' debutantpris for his literary début, Mellom speil og speil; Gyldendal's Endowment in 1968; the Aschehoug Prize in 1981; the Brage Prize for Poetry in 1993 and Honorary Award in 1997; the Gyldendal Prize in 2000; the Anvil Award in 2004; and he was nominated for the Nordic Council's Literature Prize in 1979 and 1999. He was awarded an honorary doctorate by the University of Oslo in 2000.

== Multimodal work ==
In 1970 Vold collaborated with artist Irma Salo Jæger and composer Sigurd Berge to create Norway's first multimedia artwork, Blikk, which was exhibited at Henie Onstad Kunstsenter. Blikk is now part of the permanent collection of National Museum of Norway, having been recreated by composer and curator Jøran Rudi in 2022.

== Works ==
=== Poetry collections ===
- 1965 mellom speil og speil (Gyldendal, Oslo)
- 1966 HEKT (Gyldendal, Oslo)
- 1966 "Istapptid"
- 1966 blikket (Kommet Forlag, Oslo)
- 1967 Svingstang (eget opptrykk i 700 eksemplarer)
- 1968 Mor Godhjertas glade versjon. Ja (Gyldendal, Oslo)
- 1969 Bo på Briskeby blues (Gyldendal, Oslo)
- 1969 kykelipi (Gyldendal, Oslo)
- 1970 Spor, snø (Gyldendal, Oslo)
- 1970 Bok 8: LIV (Gyldendal, Oslo)
- 1978 S (Gyldendal, Oslo)
- 1979 sirkel sirkel: boken om prins Adrians reise (Gyldendal, Oslo)
- 1987 Sorgen. Sangen. Veien (Gyldendal, Oslo)
- 1988 En som het Abel Ek (Gyldendal, Oslo)
- 1989 Elg (Gyldendal, Oslo)
- 1993 IKKE : skillingstrykk fra nittitallet (Gyldendal, Oslo)
- 1993 En sirkel is (Gyldendal, Oslo)
- 1995 Kalenderdikt (Gyldendal, Oslo)
- 1997 Ikke (illustrated by Steffen Kverneland) (Samlaget, Oslo)
- 2000 I vektens tegn : 777 dikt, anthology
- 2002 Tolv meditasjoner (Gyldendal, Oslo)
- 2003 Diktet minner om verden (Kommet Forlag, Oslo) Extended version published by Gyldendal 2004
- 2004 Drømmemakeren sa (Gyldendal, Oslo)
- 2011 Store hvite bok å se (Gyldendal, Oslo)

=== Multimedia installations ===
- 1970 Blikk (Henie Onstad Kunstsenter)
- 2022 Blikk (National Museum of Norway)

=== Prose ===
- 1967 fra rom til rom : SAD & CRAZY (Gyldendal, Oslo)
- 1976 BusteR BrenneR (Gyldendal, Oslo)

=== Essays ===
- 1976 Entusiastiske essays : klippbok 1960–75 (Gyldendal, Oslo)
- 1980 Det norske syndromet
- 1984 Her. Her i denne verden : essays og samtaler (Gyldendal, Oslo)
- 1990 Poetisk praksis 1975–1990 (Gyldendal, Oslo)
- 1994 Under Hauges ord
- 1995 Etterblikk. Ernst Orvil, poet
- 1998 Storytellers
- 1999 Tydelig, 33 : essays 1965–1998 (Gyldendal, Oslo)
- 2000 Mørkets sangerske. En bok om Gunvor Hofmo
- 2005 God jul med Gertrude Stein og andre essays

=== Drama ===
- Prins Adrians reise : et hørespill for åtte stemmer, for NRK Radioteatret (produced 1984, replay 1984)
- Noe om noe : et fore-drag for radio, for NRK Radioteatret (produsert 1986, replay 1986)

=== Discography ===
- 1969 Briskeby blues (with Jan Garbarek)(PolyGram Records, Oslo)
- 1971 Hav (with Jan Garbarek)
- 1973 Trikkeskinner (single with Jan Garbarek)
- 1977 Ingentings bjeller
- 1981 Stein. Regn (with Kåre Virud)
- 1986 Den dagen Lady døde / Jan Erik Vold leser dikt av Frank O'Hara (Hot Club Records, Oslo)
- 1988 Blåmann! Blåmann! (with Chet Baker) (Hot Club Records, Oslo)
- 1990 Sannheten om trikken er at den brenner (Hot Club Records, Oslo)
- 1992 Pytt Pytt Blues (Hot Club Records, Oslo)
- 1994 Obstfelder live på Rebecka West (Hot Club Records, Oslo)
- 1996 Her er huset som Per bygde (Hot Club Records, Oslo)
- 1998 Storytellers (Hot Club Records, Oslo)
- 2005 Vold synger svadaåret inn (Hot Club Records, Oslo)
- 2008 Drømmemakeren sa (with Egil Kapstad) (Hot Club Records, Oslo)
- 2009 Jan Erik Vold: Vokal – The Complete Recordings 1966–1977 (Plastic Strip/Musikkoperatørene)
- 2010 Telemark Blue (with Chet Baker) (Hot Club Records, Oslo)
- 2012 Blackbird Bye Bye (with Bill Frisell og Arild Andersen) (Hot Club Records, Oslo)

=== Reinvented poems ===
- 1964 Peter Bichsel : Egentlig ville fru Blum bli kjent med melkemannen (Pax Forlag, Oslo)
- 1969 William Carlos Williams: LOVE
- 1971 Samuel Beckett: Alle dem som faller (Originaltittel: All that fall, radio play, send the in NRK Radioteatret 11 November 1971)
- 1972 Robert Creeley Alt er vann/om du ser lenge nok : 74 poems from For love (Pax Forlag, Oslo)
- 1972 Bob Dylan: Tarantula (Gyldendal, Oslo)
- 1977 Bob Dylan: Damer i regn : 70 sanger på norsk (Den norske bokklubben, Stabekk)
- 1983 Frank O'Hara: Solen ute på Fire Island & andre dikt
- 1987 Samuel Beckett og fleire: Becketts ring : samlede dikt av Samuel Beckett; spredte dikt av Rimbaud, Apollinaire, Éluard (Forlaget Oktober, Oslo)
- 1996 Tomas Tranströmer Samlede dikt (Gyldendal, Oslo)
- 1998 Storytellers : en begrunnet antologi (Gyldendal, Oslo)
- 2004 Richard Brautigan: Å føre krig mot den gjengse maratonprosa (Kolon, Oslo)
- 2005 Samuel Beckett: Vente på Godot
- 2009 Wallace Stevens: Keiseren av iskrem (Gyldendal, Oslo)

=== Nonfiction, author biographies ===
- 1962 Johan Borgen : 1902 – 1962, coauthors (Det norske Studentersamfund, Oslo)
- 1969 Edgar Miguel Molina : 1969 Author (TPA Methodology, Bogotá, Colombia).
- 1964 Tarjei Vesaas : et skrift lagt fram på Kulturutvalgets Tarjei Vesaas-aften i Universitetets aula 14. mars 1964, editor and co-author (Det norske Studentersamfund, Oslo)
- 1975 Jazz i Norge, Editor together with Olav Angell and Einar Økland (Gyldendal, Oslo)
- 1978 Ernst Orvil : en bok til 80-årsdagen 12.April 1978, redigert saman men Johan Fredrik Grøgaard og Kjell Heggelund (Gyldendal, Oslo)
- 1980 Det norske syndromet : et kritisk syn på norsk lyrikk (Universitetsforlaget, Oslo)
- 1986 Per Kleiva, redigert saman med Ulf Renberg and Harald Flor (Labyrinth Press, Oslo)
- 1994 Under Hauges ord : essays, samtaler, brev, dikt, fotos (Samlaget, Oslo) – Read the full text
- 2000 Mørkets sangerske : a book about Gunvor Hofmo (Gyldendal, Oslo)
- 2001 Uten manus : dokumentarisk 1980–2000 (Gyldendal, Oslo)
- 2007 Ruth Maiers dagbok – en jødisk flyktning i Norge, ed. (Gyldendal, Oslo)

=== Anthologies and other writings ===
- 1974 Poesi pluss (Den norske bokklubben, Stabekk)
- 1974 USA 74
- 1975 Olav H. Hauge: Syn oss åkeren din (Den norske bokklubben, Stabekk)
- 1978 Erling Christie: og undring rører vår uro (Den norske bokklubben, Stabekk)
- 1983 Sigurd Bodvar: Dikt i utvalg : 1933–1983 (Tiden, Oslo)
- 1985 Moderne norsk lyrikk : frie vers 1890–1980 : en antologi, redigert saman med Kjell Erik Heggelund (Cappelen, Oslo) – Read the full text
- 1988 Sverre Udnæs: Dramatikk 1964–1982 (Gyldendal, Oslo)
- 1988 Cornelis Vreeswijk: Sånger (Bromberg, Stockholm)
- 1990 Ernst Orvil: Sommer : samlede dikt 1940–1955 (Gyldendal, Oslo)
- 1991 Ernst Orvil: Vandringer : samlede dikt 1955–1970 (Gyldendal, Oslo)
- 1992 Ernst Orvil: Brekasjer : samlede dikt 1970–1985 (Gyldendal, Oslo)
- 1993 Sigurd Bodvar: Leve, det går an : tre prosa-bøker (Aschehoug, Oslo)
- 1996 Ernst Orvil: Samlede noveller (Gyldendal, Oslo)
- 1997 Gunvor Hofmo: Etterlatte dikt (Gyldendal, Oslo)
- 1997 Ernst Orvil: Samlede skuespill (Gyldendal, Oslo)
- 1998 Ernst Orvil: Utvalgte dikt (Gyldendal, Oslo)
- 1999 Gunvor Hofmo: Jeg glemmer ingen
- 2000 Cornelis Vreeswijk: Skrifter (Ordfronts förlag, Stockholm)
- 2000 Gunnar Larsen: En avismanns samlede poesi (Gyldendal, Oslo)
- 2001 Sigbjørn Obstfelder: Samlede dikt (Gyldendal, Oslo)
- 2003 P x 3 : Prøysen, Stevens, Tranströmer (Gyldendal, Oslo)
- 2004 Kate Næss: sekstitallets hemmelige dronning : samlede dikt og gjendiktninger (Den norske lyrikklubben, Stabekk)
- 2004 Richard Brautigan: Å føre krig mot den gjengse maratonprosa (Kolon Forlag, Oslo)
- 2004 Bob Dylan: Damer i regn (Gyldendal, Oslo)
- 2010 Fem stemmer : essays, antologi, lydspor (Om: Uppdal, Hofmo, Ulven, Heggelund, Nyquist) (Aschehoug, Oslo)
