= Hanne Ørstavik =

Norwegian writer (born 1969)

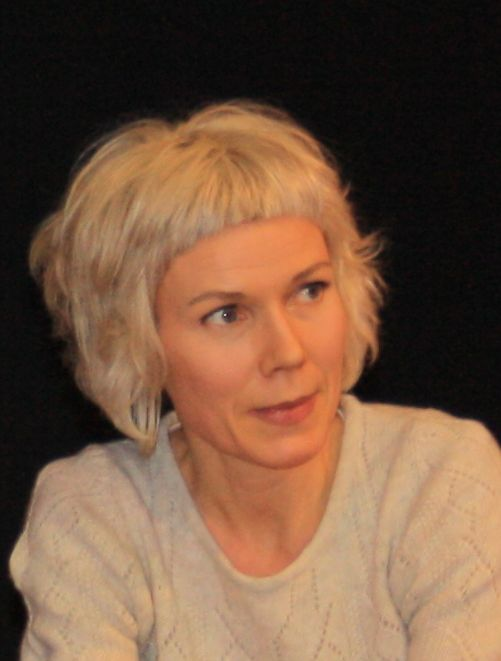
- Born: 28 November 1969 (age 56); Tana, Norway
- Occupations: Author, novelist
- Writing career
- Genre: Fiction
- Notable awards: Dobloug Prize (2002); Amalie Skram Prize (2002); Brage Prize (2004); Aschehoug Prize (2007)

Hanne Ørstavik (born 28 November 1969) is a Norwegian writer. She has published sixteen novels and her works have been translated into eighteen languages. She is best known for Kjærlighet (Love), the English translation of which won the Pen Translation Prize and was shortlisted in the translation category of the US National Book Awards. She has also won the Dobloug Prize, the Brage Prize, the Amalie Skram Prize, and the Gyldendal Prize.

== Life ==
Ørstavik was born in Tana Municipality in Finnmark county in the far north of Norway. She moved to Oslo at the age of 16. She studied French, psychology and sociology at the University of Oslo and in 1993-4 attended Forfatterstudiet i Bø (The Writers' School in Bø).

She is trained as a Rosen Method therapist and has practised this alongside her writing.

Her translation of Leslie Kaplan's book L'Excès – l'usine from French into Norwegian was published in 1998. She has also translated the work of Mirja Unge and Marguerite Duras.

== Literary career ==
Ørstavik published her debut novel, Hakk (Cut), in 1994, with Entropi following in 1995. These novels were written while she was studying writing in Bø. Both are "punktroman" or "pointillist" novels, a genre associated with the writer Paal-Helge Haugen.

In 1997, she published Kjærlighet (Love), which was voted the 6th best Norwegian book of the last 25 years in a poll published by Dagbladet in 2006. The novel centres on a young boy and his mother and takes place over a single night in the far north of Norway.

Her next two novels, Like sant som jeg er virkelig (1999, As True as I am Real or This is What I Really Am, English translation The Blue Room, 2014) and Tiden det tar (2000, The Time it Takes), also focus on family life and difficult parent-child relationships, and the three are sometimes seen as a trilogy on unhealthy family relationships. In Like sant som jeg er virkelig, a devoutly religious mother locks up her daughter in order to prevent her going travelling with her boyfriend. In Tiden det tar, during a family Christmas visit, the protagonist recalls traumatic childhood memories involving her father's violence towards her mother.

Ørstavik's next novel, Uke 43 (2000, Week 43) features a lecturer who grows increasingly disillusioned with literature's power to capture reality. This was followed by two novels in which the same theme is addressed in a religious context. The protagonist of Presten (2004, The Pastor), is a priest posted to Finnmark, where she struggles to find adequate language to meet the crises affecting the community. Her issues are juxtaposed with an account of the 1852 Kautokeino rebellion and the role played in it by the translation of the Bible into the Sámi language. Kallet – romanen (2006, The call – the novel) features a woman missionary and writer and once again addresses the failure of language to adequately convey reality, as the protagonist struggles with her readers' misunderstanding and with her own attempt to write an account of her grandmother's life.

Between 2009 and 2014, Ørstavik continued to address the theme of representation, with a series of novels that feature protagonists struggling with artistic failure, exploring sexuality, and coming to terms with childhood trauma. 48 rue Defacqz (2009) is set over a single morning in the lives of twins Paul and Rakel, who are struggling with their incestuous connection and their parents' death. Hyenene (2011, Hyenas) describes a writer seeking new experiences during a visit to southern Britain. Det finnes en stor åpen plass i Bordeaux (2013, A Wide Open square in Bordeaux) focuses on distances and disconnections in an artist's relationship with her partner. This was followed by a standalone sequel, På terrassen i mørket (2014, On the terrace in the dark), in which a social anthropologist takes on a research project where she exposes herself to prostitution.

Between 2019 and 2023, Ørstavik published three novels set in Milan, where she herself moved to be with her new husband. The first of these is 2019's Roman. Milano (Novel. Milan), in which the narrator, who was left behind in Norway as a child when her parents moved to the US, goes to Milan to be with the curator of an art gallery.

This was followed by Ti Amo (2020, English translation Ti Amo, 2022), a work of autofiction which describes the death of the narrator's husband. Like Ørstavik, the narrator is a writer who has recently moved to Milan to live with an Italian publisher, who subsequently dies of cancer. The novel also continues to address issues of representation, with the narrator struggling to speak only truth. The Times Literary Supplement said that "it bears the shadow of experiences so raw that they overwhelm the possibility of reflection, embellishment and transformation – that is to say, of fiction."

Bli hos meg (2023, English translation Stay with Me, 2024) functions as a sequel to the previous two. In it a widowed writer living in Milan embarks on a new relationship while processing childhood trauma.

== Awards and recognition ==
Ørstavik has received a number of literary prizes. In 2002, she was awarded the Dobloug Prize for her literary works, and in 2004, the Brage Prize for the novel Presten. She was awarded the Amalie Skram Prize in 2002.

In 2024, Ørstavik was awarded the Gyldendal Prize, Norway's richest literary prize awarded every two years to an author for their entire body of work. Previous winners include Dag Solstad, Jon Fosse, Vigdis Hjorth, Karl Ove Knausgård and Per Petterson.

Ørstavik's books have been translated into eighteen languages.

== Translations in English ==
In 2014 Peirene Press published the first ever English translation of one of her novels - The Blue Room - as part of their Coming of Age series.

In 2018 Archipelago Books published Kjærlighet (1997) as Love, translated by Martin Aiken. Her first novel to be published in the United States, Love was shortlisted for the National Book Awards in the category Translated Literature and won the 2019 PEN Translation Prize. Love was published in the UK by And Other Stories in 2019. It was longlisted for the Warwick Prize for Women in Translation.

Since then, three more of Martin Aiken's English translations of Ørstavik's novels have been published: The Pastor (2021; Norwegian: Presten, 2004), Ti Amo (2022; Norwegian: Ti Amo, 2020), and Stay With Me (2024; Norwegian: Bli hos meg, 2023).

== Works ==
=== Novels ===
- 1994: Hakk
- 1995: Entropi
- 1997: Kjærlighet
  - Love, translated by Martin Aitken (Archipelago Books, USA, 2018) ISBN 9780914671947, (And Other Stories, UK, 2019)
- 1999: Like sant som jeg er virkelig
  - The Blue Room, translated by Deborah Dawkin (Peirene Press, 2014), ISBN 9781908670151
- 2000: Tiden det tar
- 2002: Uke 43
- 2004: Presten
  - The Pastor, translated by Martin Aitken (Archipelago Books, USA, 2021) ISBN 9781953861085
- 2006: Kallet - romanen
- 2009: 48 rue Defacqz
- 2011: Hyenene
- 2013: Det finnes en stor åpen plass i Bordeaux
- 2014: På terrassen i mørket
- 2017: Over fjellet
- 2019: Roman. Milano
- 2020: Ti amo
  - Ti Amo, translated by Martin Aitken (Archipelago Books, USA, 2022) ISBN 9781953861443
- 2023: Bli hos meg
  - Stay with Me, translated by Martin Aitken (And Other Stories, UK, 2024) ISBN 9781916751088

=== Other ===
- 2007: I morgen skal det være åpent for alle (text)
- 2008: Der alt er klart (text and images, in collaboration with the French artist Pierre Duba)

== Awards ==
- no:Tanums kvinnestipend 1998
- NRK P2 Listener's Prize 1999, for Like sant som jeg er virkelig
- Sult Prize 1999
- no:Havmannprisen 2000, for Tiden det tar
- Oktober Prize 2000
- Dobloug Prize 2002
- Amalie Skram Prize 2002
- Klassekampen's Literary Award 2004, for Presten
- Brage Prize 2004, for Presten
- Aschehoug Prize 2007
- PEN Translation Prize 2019, for Love (trans. Martin Aitken)
- Gyldendal Prize 2023
