= Tone Hellesund =

Norwegian ethnologist

Tone Hellesund (born 1967) is a Norwegian ethnologist who specializes in gender studies. After working at the Norwegian Museum of Cultural History (1995–97), she undertook a four-year doctorate with funding from the Research Council of Norway. As of April 2022, she is Professor of Cultural Studies at the Department of Archaeology, History, Cultural Studies and Religion at the University of Bergen.

== Biography ==
Born in Molde Municipality on 13 April 1967, Tone Hellesund grew up in Åsane. She graduated with a master's degree in ethnology in 1995, after which she worked as an expert consultant at the Norwegian Museum of Cultural History. In 2002, she earned a Ph.D. with a dissertation titled Den norske peppermø. Om kulturell konstituering av kjønn og organisering av enslighet 1870-1940. (The Norwegian Spinster. On the cultural constitution of gender and the organization of loneliness 1870–1940.) Her writings also cover the first and second wave women's movement, homosexual identity, and those living outside normal families. In 2003, she was awarded the Meltser Mediation Prise (Meltzers formidlingspris) for the insights she expressed in her dissertation.

In a 2018, interview with Hellesund, Linda Marie Rustad examined how her views on single women had evolved since 2003, in particular in the light of women living alone with their children. Together with authors from Portugal, Bulgaria and the United Kingdom, Hellesund contributed to The Tenacity of the Couple-Norm (2020) in which she examines how couples, frequently consisting of unconventional partnerships, are surprisingly common throughout Europe despite changes in legislation.
