= Liv Køltzow =

Norwegian novelist, playwright and biographer (1945–2025)

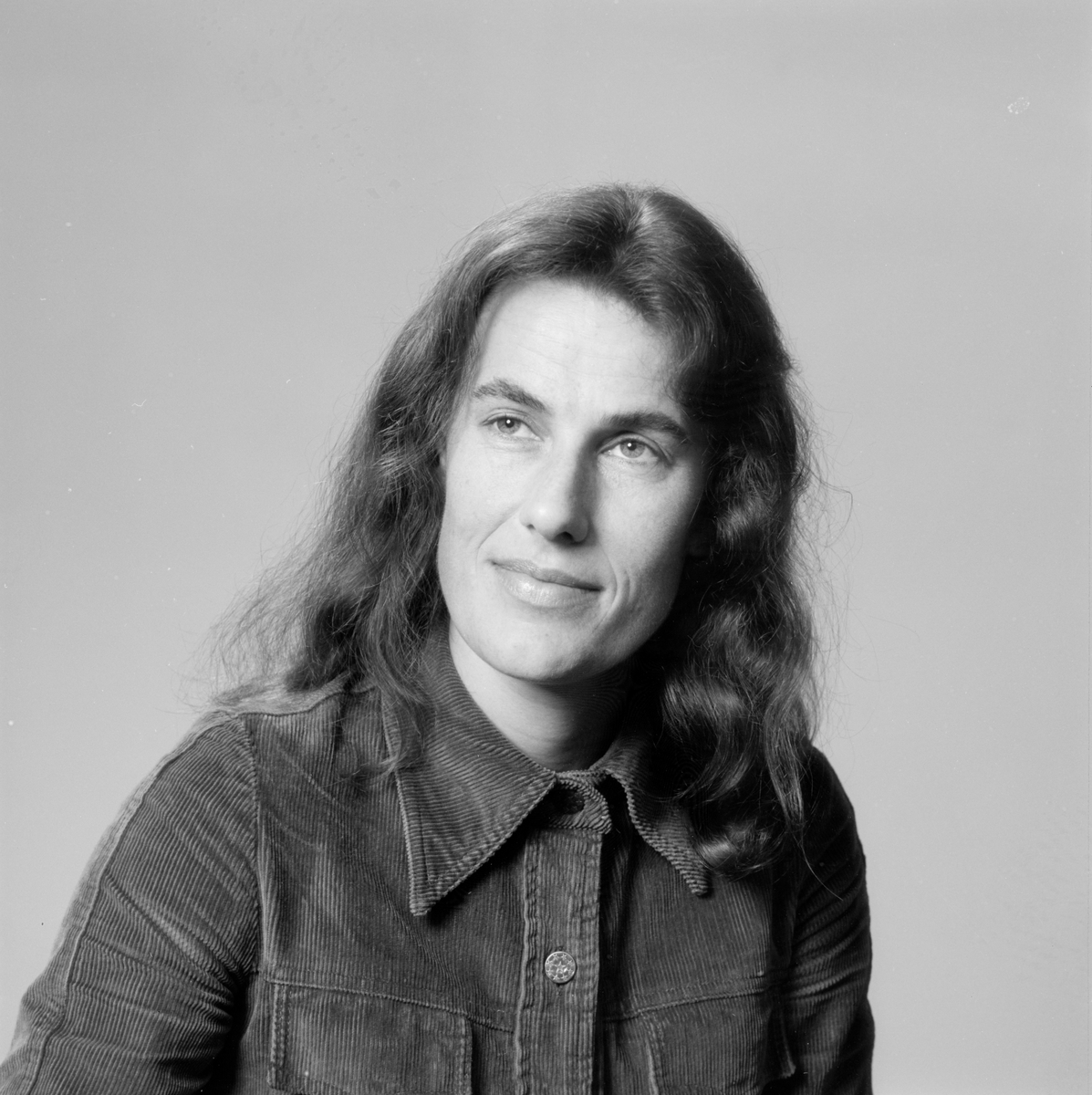
- Køltzow in 1980
- Born: 14 January 1945; Oslo, German-occupied Norway
- Died: 12 October 2025 (aged 80); Bærum, Akershus, Norway
- Occupations: Novelist; playwright; biographer; essayist
- Notable work: Hvem bestemmer over Bjørg og Unni?
- Spouses: Espen Haavardsholm (m. 1966; div. 1973) Kjell Heggelund (m. 1985; died 2017)
- Awards: Mads Wiel Nygaard's Endowment; Gyldendal's Endowment; Brage Prize; Aschehoug Prize; Norwegian Critics Prize for Literature

Liv Køltzow (14 January 1945 – 12 October 2025) was a Norwegian novelist, playwright, biographer and essayist. She received the Mads Wiel Nygaards Endowment, the Gyldendal's Endowment, the Amalie Skram Prize, the Brage Prize (twice), the Aschehoug Prize and the Norwegian Critics Prize for Literature.

== Background ==
Køltzow was born in Oslo on 14 January 1945, to Oscar Køltzow and Else Mathisen. She was married to writer Espen Haavardsholm from 1966 to 1973, and to Kjell Heggelund from 1985.

Køltzow died in Bærum Hospital on 12 October 2025, at the age of 80, having suffered from Parkinson's disease since 2002 and had deep brain stimulation from 2013.

== Career ==
Køltzow published texts in the modernist literary magazine Profil. She was regarded as one of the central Norwegian feminist writers during the 1970s, and the short novel Hvem bestemmer over Bjørg og Unni? (1972) has been called Norway's first pamphlet of the militant and socialist feminism in the 1970s.

Her novel Historien om Eli from 1975 deals with psychological aspects of individuals. The novel was also translated into Swedish and Danish language. Further books are the novel Løp, mann from 1980, two stories in the collection April/November (1983), and the novel Hvem har ditt ansikt? from 1988.

She received Gyldendal's Endowment in 1988, and was the first winner of the Amalie Skram Prize, in 1994. The novel Hvem har ditt ansikt was nominated for the Nordic Council's Literature Prize in 1989, but did not win the prize. She was awarded the Brage Prize in 1997 for the novel Verden forsvinner.

In 2002 she published the novel Det avbrutte bildet, and in 2004 the essay collection Essays 1975–2004. She has also written two biographical volumes on Amalie Skram, published in 1992 and 1996. She was awarded the Gyldendal Prize in 2015. Køltzow received the Aschehoug Prize in 2018, for the novel Melding til alle reisende.

Køltzow was awarded the Norwegian Critics Prize for Literature for non-fiction in 2021 for Dagbøker i utvalg 1964–2018, along with Kaja Schjerven Mollerin and Hans Petter Blad.

== Selected bibliography ==
- Øyet i treet – (1970)
- Hvem bestemmer over Bjørg og Unni? – (1972)
- Historien om Eli – (1975)
- Løp, mann – (1980)
- April/November – (1983)
- Hvem har ditt ansikt – (1988)
- Den unge Amalie Skram – biography (1992)
- Verden forsvinner – (1997)
- Det avbrutte bildet – (2002)
- Melding til alle reisende – (2018)

== Awards ==
- Mads Wiel Nygaards Endowment 1975
- Gyldendal's Endowment 1988
- Amalie Skram Prize 1994
- Brage Prize 1997
- Gyldendal Prize 2015
- Aschehoug Prize 2018
- Brage Prize 2021
- Norwegian Critics Prize for Literature (2021)
