= Sarita Skagnes =

Norwegian writer

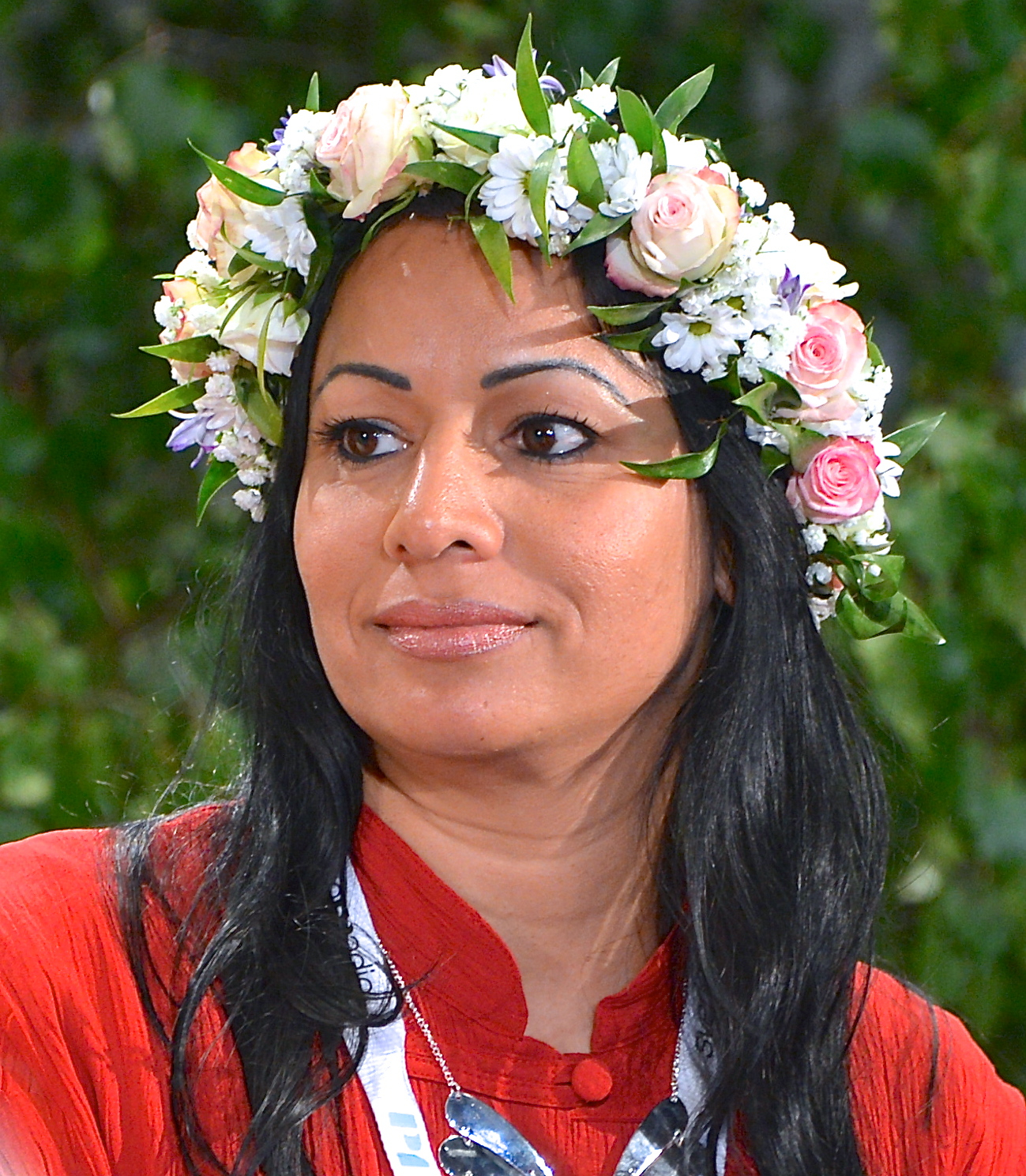
Sarita Skagnes in 2013

Sarita Skagnes, (nee Satwant Kaur; born 1969) is a Norwegian author.

== Biography ==
Satwant Kaur was born in 1969, in Punjab, India, and grew up in India. As the third, and unwanted, girl, she was exchanged for a male cousin and instead grew up as a servant girl for another family. Her parents and siblings moved to Norway. When the father returned to India, Skagnes' grandmother pleaded with him to take Sarita to Norway as well. Sarita came to Norway at the age of sixteen, and has since broken all contact with her birth family.

At the age of nineteen, she met the Norwegian man Alex Skagnes and even though her family protested and threatened them, they got married a year later and moved to Värmland in Sweden. Skagnes has for many years worked with charity organisations that works with helping girls in India. She along with her husband has started a help-fund called Fund for Higher Education of Girls in India, and she also makes speeches for young women and girls about their situation around the world. Her book Bare en datter (Just a daughter) has been published and translated into Norwegian, Swedish, Finnish and English. All the royalties goes directly to the Help-fund.

Skagnes was on 9 July 2013 the presenter for Sommar i P1 at Sveriges Radio where she talked about the struggle to find her identity and women's rights.

== Bibliography ==
- 2007 Bara en dotter ISBN 9789186859480
