= Ellen Einan =

Norwegian poet and illustrator

- Born: 5 June 1931; Svolvær, Nordland, Norway
- Died: 25 March 2013 (aged 81); Kabelvåg, Norway
- Occupations: Poet and illustrator
- Awards: Aschehoug Prize (2002); Dobloug Prize (2012)

Ellen Einan (5 June 1931 – 25 March 2013) was a Norwegian poet and illustrator.

== Biography ==
Ellen Einan was born at Svolvaer in Nordland, Norway, on 5 June 1931.

Einan was known throughout Norway for her compact writing style, mystical vocabulary, vivid imagery, and overall unusual but fascinating poems. She made her literary debut in 1982 with the poetry collection Den gode engsøster. Among her more notable works included Søster natt (1985), Døgnfarvene er mørke (1991), De syv nattstegene (1992), Jade for min engel (1994) Innenfor og utenfor er ett (1999) and Dagen får min uro (2004). Several of her books were illustrated with her own drawings.

She was awarded the Aschehoug Prize in 2002 and the Havmannprisen awarded by Nordland fylkesbibliotek in 2009. In 2012, she received both the Dobloug Prize and the Diktartavla which is awarded jointly by the Hardanger Folk Museum and the Olav H. Hauge Center.
