= Juliane Rui =

Norwegian writer

Juliane Rui (born 21 March 1982) is a Norwegian poet.

She grew up in the Gjerpen area of Skien Municipality and later moved to the town of Stavern. Her poetry collections are Den hesten er av snø (Samlaget, 2011), Systrer kan bli like gamle (Samlaget, 2012), Aude så rørsle kan synast (Samlaget, 2017), Snurr mi eng (Samlaget, 2020) and Oumuamua (Oktober, 2022). Environmentalism is one of her main literary themes.

Her debut collection was extensively reviewed, by Vårt Land, Bergens Tidende, Klassekampen, VG and Dagbladet. Later, the mainstream reviews were fewer, with Systrer kan bli like gamle and Snurr mi eng being discussed by Klassekampen, Snurr mi eng by Bokvennen Litterær Avis as well, and Oumuamua by Samtiden and Morgenbladet. Thus, in 2022 she initiated a public debate about the low quantity of poetry criticism in Norway.
