= Aadel Brun Tschudi =

Norwegian sinologist and geographer (1909–1980)

Aadel Marie Brun Tschudi
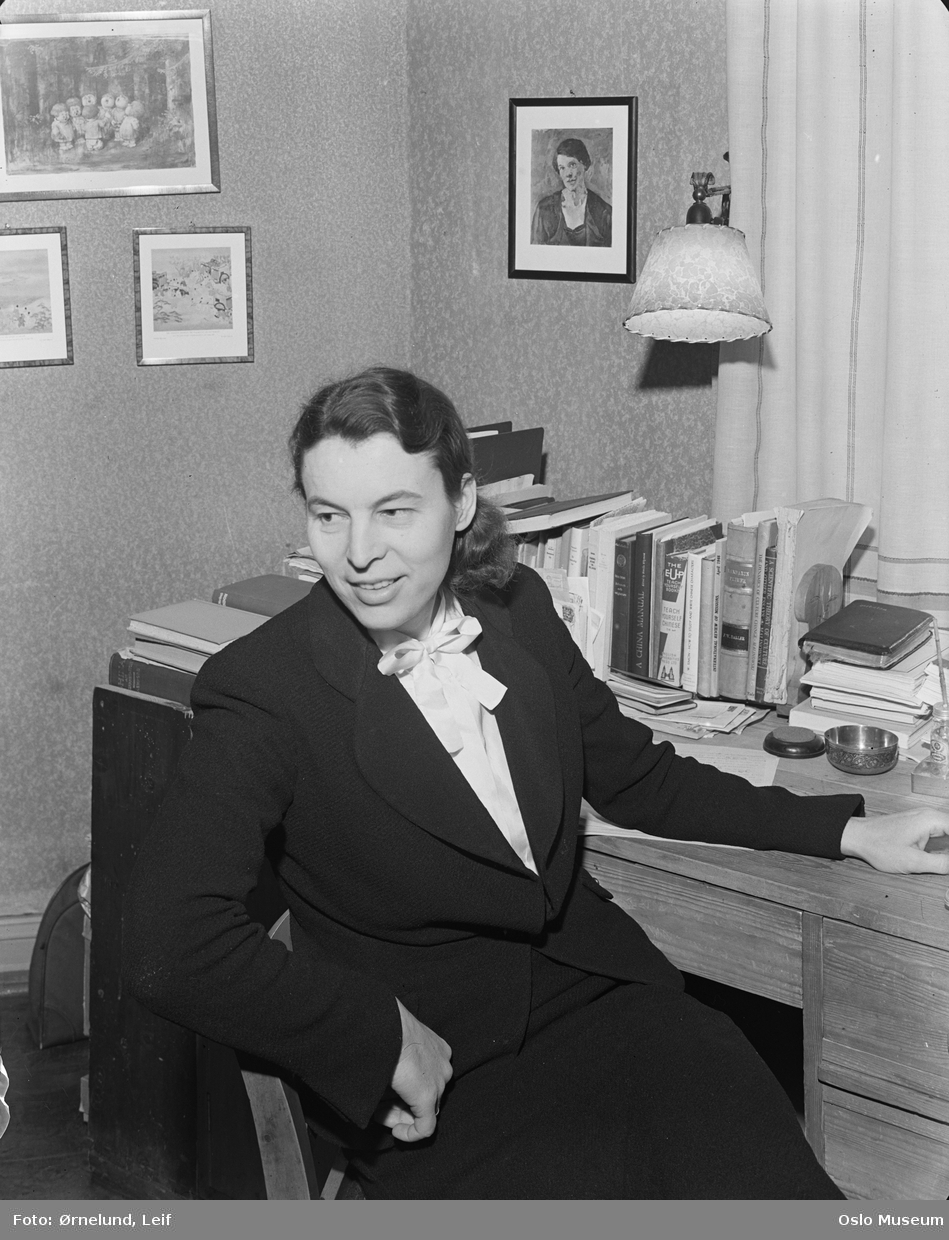
- Aadel Brun Tschudi (1949)
- Born: Aadel Marie Brun; 29 September 1909; Yiyang, China
- Died: 3 November 1980 (aged 71); Oslo, Norway
- Other names: Aadel Marie Brun Tschudi
- Occupation: Geographer

Aadel Marie Brun Tschudi (29 September 1909, Yiyang—3 November 1980, Oslo) was a Chinese-born Norwegian geographer and sinologist who taught at the University of Oslo, successfully focusing on social geography. During a trip to East Asia in 1957, she contributed a series of reports to the Norwegian broadcaster NRK and on her return published her impressions of the country in Japan, soloppgangens land (Japan, land of the rising sun, 1957). She became involved in research projects in support of Botswana, Sri Lanka and her native China. From 1967 to 1973, she edited the Norwegian Journal of Geography (Norsk geografisk tidsskrift) and in 1977 became a member of the Norwegian Academy of Science and Letters. That year, following the end of the Cultural revolution, she travelled back to Yiyang to meet her family, report on her visit in Gjensyn med Kina (Reunion with China, 1978).

== Early life, family and education ==
Born on 29 September 1909 in Taohualun in Yiyang, China, Aadel Marie Brun was the daughter of the missionary cleric Sigurd Brun (1870–1927) and his wife Aagot née Lie (1880–1951), a teacher. When she was 15, she moved to Denmark where she completed her high school education in Fredrikstad in 1927 and went on to study philology at the University of Oslo. In June 1933, she married the theologian Stephan Tschudi (1908–1996), with whom she had three children. In 1951, she completed her studies in Oslo, specializing in geography and graduating as a Cand.phil., equivalent to a master's degree. In 1951–52, she studied Chinese at Harvard University.

== Career ==
During the lengthy period she spent at home as a housewife, she became active in Norway's women's organizations. In 1945 she was elected chair of the Oslo branch of the Norske Kvinnelige Akademikeres Landsforbund, an association linked to the International Federation of University Women. From the late 1940s and for the next 15 years, she became a frequent broadcaster on foreign affairs, especially in connection with China and East Asia. After travelling through East Asia in 1957, she made an extensive series of detailed reports on NRK radio. She also published her impressions of Japan in Japan, soloppgangens land (Japan, land of the rising sun, 1957).

In 1960, Tschudi was engaged as a lecturer in geography at the University of Oslo. From 1970 to 1972, she lectured in sinology at the university's Østasiatisk institutt (East-Asian Institute. In 1973, she returned to the geographic institute in the Department of History and Philosophy where she received an appointment as docent or senior lecturer, specializing in non-European studies. Tschudi was the only woman engaged to lecture in social geography until the 1990s. She was particularly successful in developing geography studies addressing topics such as poor living conditions in the developing countries. She initiated research projects in support of Botswana, Sri Lanka and China while carrying out her own research on Norwegian agriculture.

From 1967 to 1973, Tschudi was editor-in-chief of the Norwegian Journal of Geography (Norsk geografisk tidsskrift) and in 1977 was elected a member of the Norwegian Academy of Sciences. Following the end of the Cultural revolution, in 1977 she travelled back to Yiyang to meet her family, report on her visit in Gjensyn med Kina (Reunion with China, 1978).

She retired from the University of Oslo in 1979.

== Death ==
Aadel Brun Tschudi died in Oslo on 3 November 1980.
