= Tove Nilsen =

Norwegian writer (born 1952)

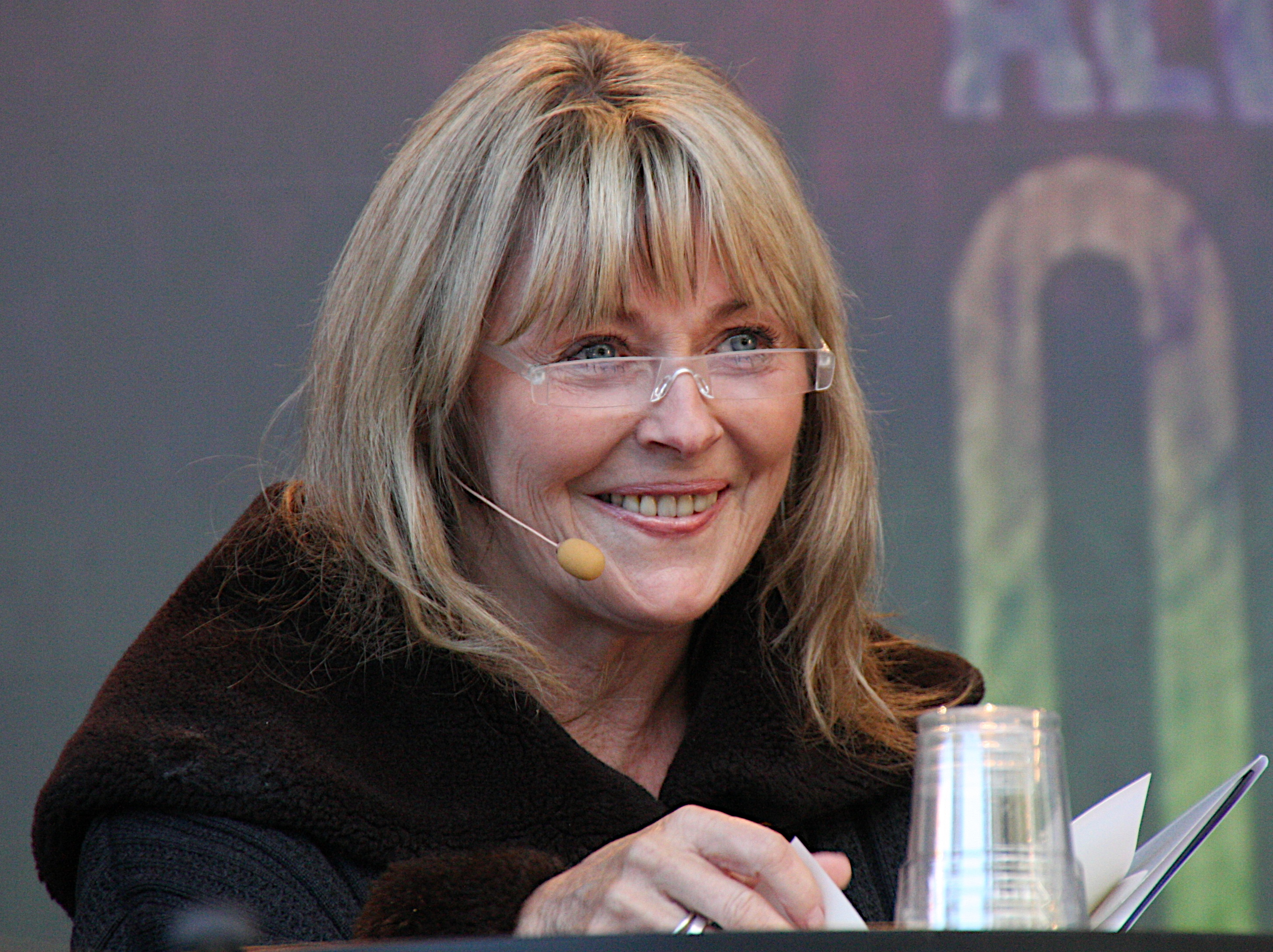
- The author Tove Nilsen
- Born: 25 October 1952 (age 73)
- Occupations: Novelist, children's writer and literary critic
- Awards: Riksmål Society Literature Prize (1993); Amalie Skram Prize (2011)

Tove Nilsen (born 25 October 1952) is a Norwegian novelist, children's writer and literary critic.

== Biography ==
Nilsen made her literary debut in 1974 with the novel Aldri la dem kle deg forsvarsløst naken. Her adolescence novel from a dormitory town, Skyskraperengler (1982) was a bestseller.

She was awarded the Riksmål Society Literature Prize in 1993. Her novel Øyets sult (1993) was nominated for the Nordic Council's Literature Prize. She was awarded the Amalie Skram Prize in 2011.
