= Toril Brekke =

Norwegian writer (born 1949)

- Born: 24 June 1949 (age 77); Oslo, Norway
- Occupations: Novelist; writer of short stories; children's writer; biographer; translator; literary critic
- Spouse: Jon Bing (m. 1988–1998)
- Father: Paal Brekke
- Awards: Mads Wiel Nygaard's Endowment (1999); Riksmål Society Literature Prize (2000); Amalie Skram Prize (2004)

Toril Brekke (born 24 June 1949) is a Norwegian novelist, writer of short stories, children's writer, biographer, translator and literary critic.

== Early and personal life ==
Brekke was born in Oslo as a daughter of the poet Paal Brekke and painter Bjørg Rasmussen. She was married to Martin Indregard from 1972 to 1982, and their son Kjetil Indregard is also a writer. She was married to professor Jon Bing from 1988 to 1998. She worked at a bread factory, and later as a typographer, and has been a full-time writer since 1982. She was a member of the Workers' Communist Party during the early 1970s, but later renounced communism.

== Literary career ==
Brekke made her literary debut in 1976 with the novel Jenny har fått sparken ('Jenny Has Been Fired'), about factory women's fight against their employer. Den gylne tonen (1980) is about women's situation in the society, while Filmen om Chatilla (1983) is from the Lebanon conflicts. Her novel Granitt (1994) is a family chronicle, the novel Ibsens røde lykt (1996) is about sexual assault, while Sara (2001) and Brostein (2003) are historical novels.

She has issued the short stories collections Jakarandablomsten (1985), Blindramme (1997)and Enkenes paradis (2000). Among her books for children and youth are Gutten i regnet (1978), Mannen som hatet fotball (1987) and Roser fra tribunene (2000). She has written a biography of her father, Paal Brekke. En kunstner. Et liv (2002).

Brekke received the Mads Wiel Nygaards Endowment in 1999. She was awarded the Riksmål Society Literature Prize in 2000. She was awarded the Amalie Skram Prize in 2004.

She was leader of Nordnorsk Forfatterlag from 1979 to 1980, of the Norwegian Authors' Union from 1987 to 1991 and of the Norwegian branch of International PEN from 1992 to 1997. She was a board member for the National Theatre from 1990 to 1992.

Cultural offices
| Preceded by Karsten Alnæs | Chair of the Norwegian Authors' Union; 1987–1991 | Succeeded by Thorvald Steen |
