= Annok Sarri Nordrå =

Swedish Sámi writer (1931–2013)

- Born: Ánná Helena Sarri; January 14, 1931; Nikkaluokta, Gällivarre, Sweden
- Died: May 4, 2013 (aged 82); Kiruna, Sweden
- Resting place: Poikkijärvi cemetery
- Occupations: Author; journalist
- Spouse: Olav Nordrå
- Writing career
- Language: Northern Saami, Swedish, Norwegian
- Genres: fiction; young adult fiction; non-fiction

Ánná Helena "Annok" Sarri Nordrå (January 14, 1931 Nikkaluokta, Gällivare, Sweden – May 4, 2013 Kiruna, Sweden) was a Northern Saami-Swedish author, journalist, and translator. She wrote mainly in Norwegian and Swedish, although she also translated books into Northern Saami.

== Biography ==
Anna Helena Sarri was born on January 14, 1931, in the small Sámi village of Nikkaluokta, Gällivare, Sweden, the second youngest of the 14 children Nigo Sarri (Nils Olsson Sarri) and Márjá Sarri (néé Haugli; Maria Sarri) had. Her oldest brother Enok Sarri was a well-known tourist guide and weather forecaster in northern Sweden and two of her other brothers — Lasse Sarri and Per Sarri — played an important role in helping Norwegian resistance fighters across the mountains along the Norwegian-Swedish border as part of the intelligence and sabotage operation Operation Sepals.

She was married to the Norwegian author Olav Nordrå (1919–1994).

== Bibliography ==
=== Books ===
==== The Ravna trilogy ====
- 1973 – Ravnas vinter
- 1975 – Fjellvuggen
- 1981 – Avskjed med Saivo

==== Other books ====
- 1977 – Gutten som ville sette spor etter seg
- 1989 – Lapplandsraderingar
- 2004 – Eldsjälen Lennart Wallmark: rektor på Samernas Folkhögskola 1947-72, together with Anna Maria Blind Olsson

==== Short stories ====
- 1981 – "Jåvna", in Gustavsen, John and Sandvik, Kjell. Vår jord er vårt liv

==== Translations ====
- 1966 – Parker, Bertha Morris. Ná dat šad'det ja sturrut, together with Isak Østmo
