= Marit Eikemo =

Norwegian writer (born 1971)

- Born: 6 April 1971 (age 55); Odda Municipality, Norway
- Occupations: Novelist and essayist Journalist and magazine editor
- Awards: Nynorsk Literature Prize (2011); Amalie Skram Prize (2017)

Marit Eikemo (born 6 April 1971) is a Norwegian essayist, novelist, journalist and magazine editor. Her awards include the Nynorsk Literature Prize and the Amalie Skram Prize.

== Career ==
Eikemo was born in Odda Municipality on 6 April 1971. She edited the book Her, no: Møte med unge menneske in 1999, and contributed to the essay collection Synd.no from 2001. Her first novel was Mellom oss sagt from 2006. In 2008 she published the essay collection Samtidsruinar, and in 2009 the novel Arbeid pågår. She was awarded the Nynorsk Literature Prize for the novel Samtale ventar in 2011. In 2017 she was awarded the Amalie Skram Prize, when the jury compared her to Skram in the way she was searching for truth and aiming to understand but not judge. She received Samlagsprisen in 2019.

Eikemo was co-editor of the cultural and political magazine Syn og Segn from 2003 to 2006, jointly with Hilde Sandvik.
