= Olav Nordrå =

Norwegian writer (1919–1994)

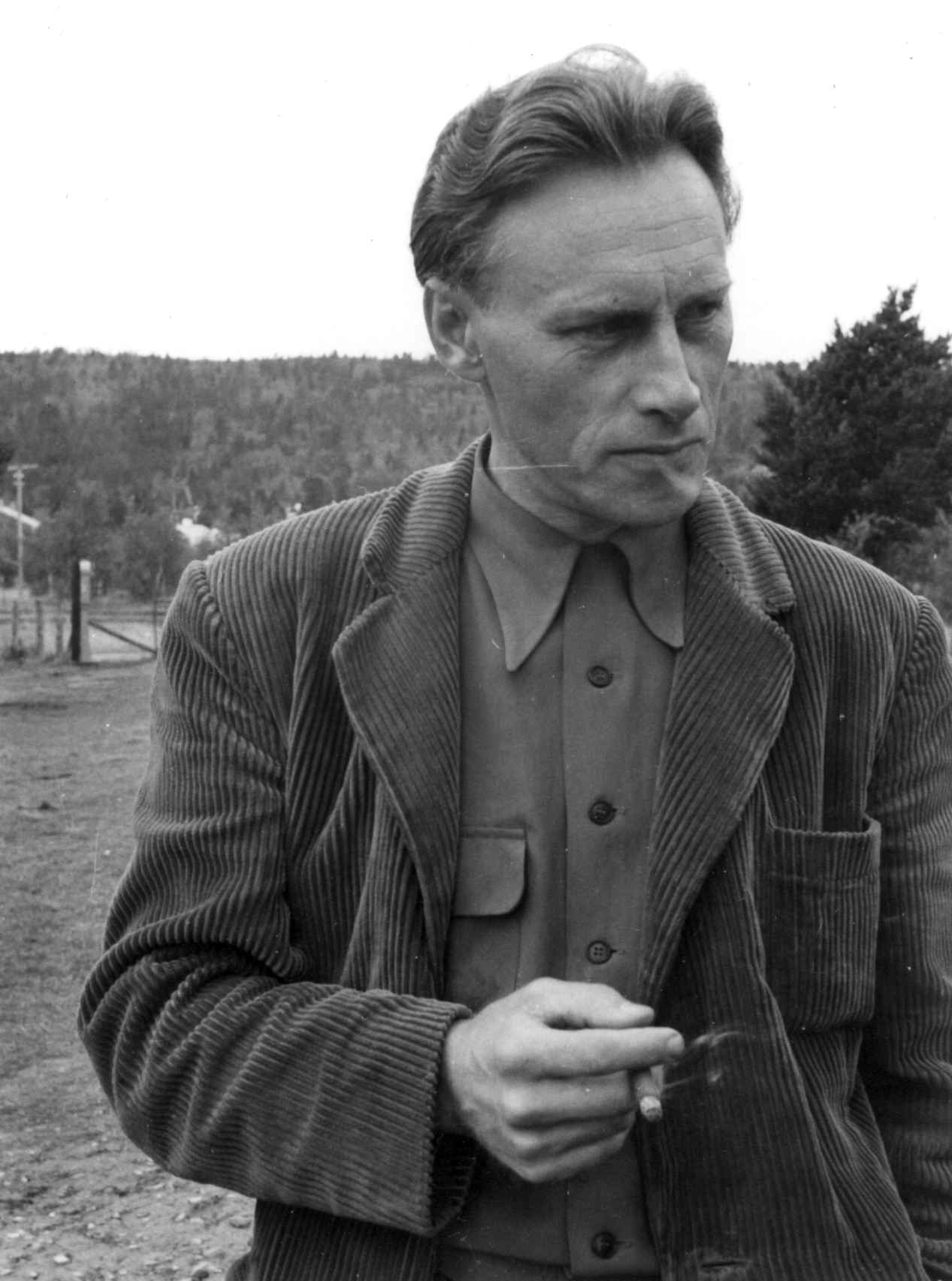
- Born: 25 December 1919
- Died: 28 April 1994 (aged 74)
- Occupation: Writer
- Spouse: Annok Sarri Nordrå

Olav Nordrå (25 December 1919, in Hammerfest – 28 April 1994) was a Norwegian writer. He won the Riksmål Society Literature Prize in 1969. He was married to the Northern Saami author Annok Sarri Nordrå.
