= Skiringssal =

Historical Viking hall in Norway

Coordinates: 59.04844°N 10.1138°E

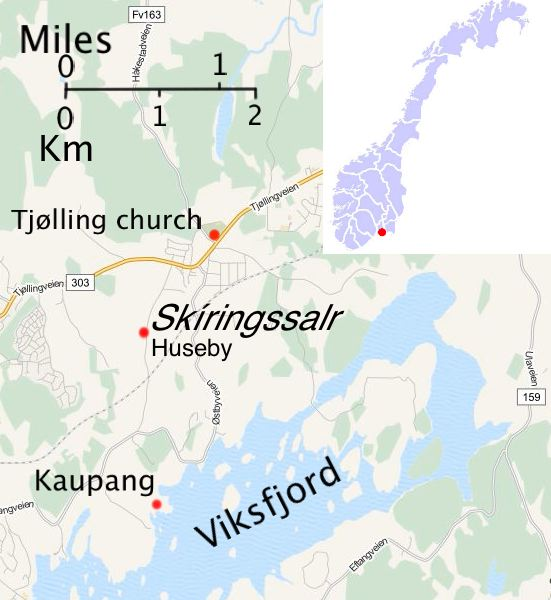
Map showing locations of Skíringssalr [Huseby], Tjølling and Kaupang in Vestfold county, Norway, with location in Norway inset.

Skiringssal (Old Norse: Skíringssalr) was the name of a Viking Age hall which stood at a site now known as Huseby, about 1.2 kilometres (0.75 mi) southwest of the village of Tjøllingvollen in Larvik Municipality in Vestfold county, Norway. It is located in what was the old Viking village of Kaupang, which is about 5 kilometres (3.1 mi) east of the present-day town of Larvik. By extension, the name also referred to the local bygd, or settlement area, and in the 15th century it was probably used synonymously for the ecclesiastical Tjølling prestegjeld.

Skiringssal is mentioned in several early medieval sources, including the Ynglinga saga, the Fagrskinna and the Sögubrot af nokkrum fornkonungum. The name last occurs in 1445, in the form "Skirisall", in a hospital register from Tønsberg. This and other documents from earlier in the 15th-century associate Skiringssal with locations in the parish of Tjølling.

Archaeological excavations at Huseby have shown that a large hall was built there in the mid-8th century and went out of use by about 900. Excavations at Kaupang, near the shoreline south-west of Tjølling, have shown that this was the location of a trading place from about 800 to the late 10th century. The hall at Huseby may have been established by the first Norwegian members of the Yngling dynasty, the trading place at Kaupang would have been established and continued under the control of the chieftain at Huseby, and Tjølling probably began as a site for public assemblies, or things, a role which it continued to play in the 16th century.

== Etymology ==
The Old Norse place-name "Skíringssalr" comprises two elements, skíring and salr. Salr denotes "a major banqueting hall, a king’s or a chieftain’s hall": in Scandinavian place-names it is also found in "Oðinssalr", "Sala" and "Uppsala". The element skíring is of uncertain meaning, though several meanings have been suggested. In the early 20th century Oluf Rygh suggested that there may have been a pagan god whose name was Skíringr, probably formed from the Old Norse adjective skírr, with the meaning "clear, pure, bright, light", combined with a suffix -ing, after whom Skíringssalr may have been named, following the model of Oðinssalr, which includes the name of the pagan god Odin; Gustav Storm suggested that Skiringr may have been an alternative name for the pagan god Freyr; and Sophus Bugge suggested that Skíringr compounded skírr with Ing, the eponymous hero of Tacitus' Ingvaeones and of the Ynglings.

In 1980 Swedish linguist Sigurd Fries suggested that Skíringr may have been an old name for Viksfjord – the bay south of Tjølling – since skírr could refer to clear water, and the suffix -ing is found in the names of numerous Scandinavian bays and fjords. In 2003 historian Andreas Nordberg suggested that Skíringssalr means "bright, shining hall". (Note: In this connection Masdalen refers to Adam of Bremen's description of the pagan temple at Uppsala in Sweden written in the 11th century: "That people has a most noble temple, which is called [Uppsala], placed not far from the city of [Sigtuna]. In this temple, which is completely covered in gold, the people venerate the statues of three gods, such that Thor, the most powerful of them, has his throne in the middle of the chamber; here and there [Odin] and [Freyr] have their places.") Historian Stefan Brink regards all of these interpretations as "practically impossible". While Skiringr is not found as the name of a god in medieval sources, nor is an Old Norse word skíring with a meaning "bright, shining", or indeed any such extension of an adjective with the suffix -ing; and an old name for Viksfjord was probably "Ælftangr", meaning "swans' bay". Instead Brink regards skíring as a word with unknown meaning and denotation. (Note: Skiringssal and Kaupang have frequently been equated with Sciringes heal, a place described as a "port" by a Norwegian seafarer known as Ohthere of Hålogaland who visited King Alfred of Wessex in about 890: for example, in 1939 R. Ekblom published a paper entitled "Ohthere's voyage from Skiringssal to Hedeby", and, in her 1980 translation of the relevant section of the Anglo-Saxon-language manuscript in which Ohthere is mentioned, historian Janet Bately writes "Sciringes heal [Kaupang]". This equation is disputed on historical and linguistic grounds by historians Einar Gunnar Birgisson and Kjell-Olav Masdalen, who respectively place Sciringes heal in Vest-Agder, the southernmost county of Norway, possibly on the Lista peninsula, and west of Lindesnes, the southernmost point of Norway.)

== Location ==
Saga sources such as the 13th-century Fagrskinna place Skiringssal in the region of Vestfold, in Viken, a historical area around Oslofjord, and documents from the 15th century indicate that Skiringssal was then a district which included Tjølling, a settlement a little over 3 miles (5 km) east of Larvik. In 1419 a farm at Guri, about 1 mile (1.6 km) south-west of Tjølling, was said to be in Skirix saal, and in 1445 properties belonging to a hospital in Tønsberg were listed under the heading "Skirissal": those properties which can be identified lay in Tjølling prestegjeld. Since Old Norse salr means "hall", the name of this district was presumably understood as the "district ... under the influence of [Skíringssalr]", the hall in question belonging to a king or chieftain. While it is likely that the original name of the local ecclesiastical parish was Tjølling, by the 15th century Skíringssalr had become the name of the bygd, or settlement district, and these names could have been used synonymously.

The eponymous hall was located at Huseby, about 0.73 miles (1.2 km) south-west of Tjølling. The place-name "Huseby" seems to have originated as an appellative for a place with an older name, it occurs frequently in Scandinavia, and it is linked with administrative control of a district. Archaeological excavations at Huseby south-west of Tjølling in 2000–01 uncovered the remains of a large hall measuring between 105 and 112 feet (32–4m) long and between 30 and 33 feet (9–10m) wide, with tapered ends, standing on a raised area which was partly man-made. (Note: Masdalen 2010, p. 48, attributes this information to archaeologist Dagfinn Skre, but the reference is defective.) This building was in existence from the mid-8th century, but went out of use by about 900. (Note: Historian Przemysław Urbańczyk notes that, in Skre 2007, the archaeological identification and reconstruction of the hall at Huseby fits a "plan directly imported [by the archaeologists] from Gamla Uppsala [and that] numerous manipulations [in the description of the history and archaeology have] allowed the construction of a very nicely designed but in fact a completely virtual banqueting hall".)

== History ==
Stefan Brink suggests that the settlement area known in the Middle Ages as Skíringssalr had its origin in an Iron Age settlement area centred on a lake immediately north of Tjølling, around which he identifies numerous place-names that are cultic in origin, suggesting in turn that the lake itself had been a sacred place. (Note: Brink suggests that the present waters of Vittersetjønna and Lilletjønna are remnants of a lake which, in the Iron Age, would have measured about 1,100 yards by about 550 yards (1km by 500m).) Further, Brink suggests that the focus of this settlement area migrated southwards to Skiringssalr, now Huseby, attracted towards the shoreline by a significant fall in sea-level between the Iron Age and the establishment of the hall at Huseby. (Note: An Iron Age name for a settlement district in this area may be preserved in Lingum, about 1.1 miles (1.8km) north of Tjølling.)

The earliest written reference to Skiringssal is in the 9th-century Ynglingatal, where it is said that the legendary petty king Halfdan Whiteshanks died in Toten but was buried in a mound at Skiringssal. Similarly the head of Halfdan the Black, a 9th-century king of Vestfold, is said by the Fagrskinna to have been buried at Skiringssal. The Sögubrot af nokkrum fornkonungum reports that, in the time of the legendary Sigurd Hring, there was an important, annual sacrifice made at Skiringssal, which was attended by the whole population of Viken. On the basis of these reports Norwegian historian Gerhard Munthe wrote in 1838 that Tjølling church stood on the site of "Viken's grandest Pagan Temple". Gustav Storm also believed that there was a pagan temple at Tjølling "under official management". Why the Christian church was built at Tjølling and not at Huseby is an "intriguing question": while Tjølling was evidently a public place of assembly for the area in medieval times, it is known that early Scandinavian churches were often built in such places, but the presence of a chieftain, or royal control, at Huseby would normally have made that the place to build a church. (Note: An early form of the place-name "Tjølling" was Þjóðalyng, which Brink interprets as identifying a heath where public meetings, or things, were held; Brink also notes that things for the royal fief of Brunla Len were held at Tjølling "as late as 1557". For the extent of Brunla Len, which included Larvik, see Helle 2006, p. 59(map).)

The trading place at Kaupang would also have been dominated by whoever controlled Skiringssal, and was probably established by them. The place-name "Kaupang" represents Old Norse kaupangr, meaning a "market" or "trading place", which was "obviously ... organised and controlled." Archaeology has identified the earliest buildings at Kaupang as dating from between 800 and 810 – about 50 years after the establishment of the hall at Skiringssal – and the latest from the mid-9th century, although some activity continued at Kaupang until the late-10th century. Archaeologist Dagfinn Skre links the development of Skiringssal and Kaupang with the first two Norwegian members of the Yngling dynasty, Halfdan Whiteleg and Eystein Fart, and introduces the idea of "king[s] of Skiringssal", but historian Przemysław Urbańczyk regards this interpretation as requiring "a specific way of reasoning, [through which] a nice-looking puzzle [has been] constructed [from historical sources] using carefully selected pieces of unclear shape and of uncertain origin."

== In literature ==
Bjørn Andreas Bull-Hansen A viking (A Jomsviking 1st book) it is a main location to the story where the main character spends a lot of his younger years, the story includes a fictive end for the settlement and their population (also in the novel, like real history, there is no dates specified)

== Bibliography ==
- Bately, J., ed. (1980). The Old English Orosius. Oxford University Press. ISBN 9780197224069.
- Birgisson, E.G. (2008). "National historiographies and the Viking Age: A re-examination". Aust-Agder-Arv Årbok 2008. Aust-Agder Kulturhistorike Senter. OCLC 759728174. Archived from the original on 15 February 2012. (link is to contents page with further link to downloadable PDF)
- Brink, S. (2007a). "Geography, toponymy and political organisation in early Scandinavia". In Bately, J.; Englert, A. (eds.). Ohthere's voyages: A late 9th-century account of voyages along the coasts of Norway and Denmark and its cultural context. Viking Ship Museum. ISBN 978-8785180476.
- Brink, S. (2007b). "Skiringssal, Kaupang, Tjølling – the toponymic evidence". In Skre, D. (ed.). Kaupang in Skiringssal. Aarhus University. pp. 53–64. ISBN 9788779342590.
- Helle, K. (2006). "Den opphavlige vestlandsregionen". In Helle, K.; Grepstad, O.; Lillehammer, A.; et al. (eds.). Vestlandets Historie: Samfunn. Bind 2. Vigmostad & Bjørke. ISBN 978-82-419-0402-8.
- Iverson, F. (2011). "The beauty of bona regalia and the growth of supra-regional powers in Scandinavia". In Sigmundsson, S. (ed.). Viking Settlements and Viking Society Papers from the Proceedings of the Sixteenth Viking Congress. University of Iceland. pp. 225–44. ISBN 978-9979-54-923-9.
- Masdalen, K.-O. (2010). "Uden Tvivl - med fuldkommen Ret. Hvor lå Sciringes heal?". Aust-Agder-Arv. Aust-Agder Kulturhistorike Senter. ISSN 0572-4368.
- Munch, P.A.; Unger, C.R., eds. (1847). Kortfattet norsk Konge-Saga fra Slutningen af det tolfte eller Begyndelsen af det trettende Aarhundrede. Malling. OCLC 5149496.
- Munthe, G. (1838). "Geografiske Anmærkninger til Snorre Sturlesons norske Kongers Sagaer". In Aall, J. (ed.). Snorre Sturlesons norske Kongers Sagaer. Vol. 1. Guldber & Dzwonkowski. OCLC 64691029.
- Pulsiano, P.; Wolf, K.; Acker, P.; et al., eds. (1993). Medieval Scandinavia: An Encyclopedia. Garland. ISBN 9780824047870.
- Skre, D., ed. (2007). Kaupang in Skiringssal. Aarhus University Press. ISBN 9788779342590.
- Storm, G. (1901), "Skiringssal og Sandefjord", Historisk Tidsskrift, vol. 1, ISSN 0106-4991
- Urbańczyk, P. (2008). "What was 'Kaupang in Skiringssal'? Comments on Dagfinn Skre (ed.): Kaupang in Skiringssal. Kaupang Excavation Project Publication Series, Vol. 1, Aarhus University Press, Århus (2007)". Norwegian Archaeological Review. 41 (2): 176–212. ISSN 1502-7678.
