= Tjølling =

Tjølling may refer to:

== Places ==
- Tjølling, or Tjøllingvollen, a village in Larvik Municipality in Vestfold county, Norway
- Tjølling Municipality, a former municipality in Vestfold county, Norway
- Tjølling prestegjeld, a former geographic subdivision of the Church of Norway in Vestfold county, Norway
- Tjølling Church, a church in Larvik Municipality in Vestfold county, Norway

== Other ==
- Tjølling IL, a sports club based in Larvik Municipality in Vestfold county, Norway
