= Ohthere of Hålogaland =

9th-century Norwegian explorer

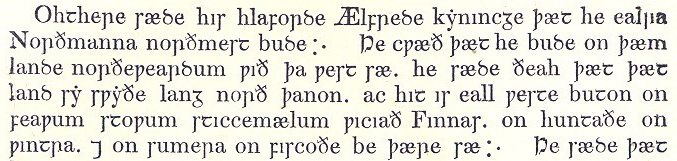
Opening lines of Ohthere's Old English account, from Thorpe's edition of 1900: "Ohthere told his lord, king Alfred, that he lived northmost of all Norwegians⁖ He said that he lived on the land northwards by the West Sea. Nevertheless, he told that the land was very long from the north, but it is all uninhabited, except in a few places here and there where the Finns (Sámi) live, hunting in winter & fishing by the sea in summer."

Ohthere of Hålogaland (Norwegian: Ottar fra Hålogaland) was a Viking Age Norwegian seafarer known only from an account of his travels that he gave to King Alfred (r. 871–99) of the Anglo-Saxon kingdom of Wessex in about 890 AD. His account was incorporated into an Old English adaptation of a Latin historical book written early in the fifth century by Paulus Orosius, called Historiarum Adversum Paganos Libri VII, or Seven Books of History Against the Pagans. The Old English version of this book is believed to have been written in Wessex in King Alfred's lifetime or soon after his death, and the earliest surviving copy is attributed to the same place and time.

In his account, Ohthere said that his home was in "Halgoland", or Hålogaland, where he lived "north-most of all Norwegians … [since] no-one [lived] to the north of him". Ohthere spoke of his travels north to the White Sea, and south to Denmark, describing both journeys in some detail. He also spoke of Sweoland (central Sweden), the Sami people (Finnas), and of two peoples called the Cwenas, living in Cwena land to the north of the Swedes, and the Beormas, whom he found living by the White Sea. Ohthere reported that the Beormas spoke a language related to that of the Sami.

Ohthere's story is the earliest known written source for the term "Denmark" (dena mearc), and perhaps also for "Norway" (norðweg). Ohthere's home may have been in the vicinity of Tromsø, in southern Troms county, northern Norway. Ohthere was involved in the fur trade.

== Sources ==
Orosius' 5th-century Seven Books of History Against the Pagans was a popular work of history in the Middle Ages, with about 250 manuscript copies from that period surviving today. Late in the 9th century King Alfred of Wessex, or members of his court, appear to have seen it as a useful basis for a world-history written in their own language, and an Old English version may have been seen as complementary to Bede's 8th-century Ecclesiastical History of the English People and the Anglo-Saxon Chronicle, which was begun in Alfred's reign. The Old English version of Orosius is an adaptation rather than a direct translation, one of its features being the addition and correction of information concerning European geography. The addition of Ohthere's account of his travels, and that of another traveller named Wulfstan, represents part of that process.

The authorship of the Old English Orosius is unknown. In the 12th century William of Malmesbury believed that it was the work of King Alfred himself, but scholarly scrutiny of the text since the mid-20th century, including by the historians Dorothy Whitelock and Janet Bately, has led to this view being refuted on lexical and syntactic grounds. (Note: King Alfred is believed to have been the principal translator into Old English of four works, namely Pope Gregory I's Pastoral Care, Boethius' The Consolation of Philosophy, Augustine of Hippo's Soliloquies and the first fifty psalms of a psalter. "In addition, several translations [into Old English] were prepared by other scholars at this time, apparently as part of Alfred's [educational] scheme".) Janet Bately believes that the Old English version of Orosius was created between 889 and 899, probably in the early 890s, but there is no way of knowing whether Ohthere's account was previously in existence and incorporated from the outset, or if it was written down later and incorporated into a subsequent copy. The events that Ohthere described may have taken place at any time from the 870s to the late 890s, and Ohthere's account is given in the form of a third-person report of what he said to King Alfred, rather than as reported speech, as exemplified by the opening sentence: "Ohthere sæde his hlaforde Ælfrede kynincge þæt he ealra Norðmanna norðmest bude." ("Ohthere told his lord Alfred king that he lived northmost of all Norwegians.") Dorothy Whitelock wrote that "Ohthere's account reads like a set of replies to questions put to him."

The Old English version of Orosius survives almost complete in two Anglo-Saxon manuscripts. The earliest is known variously as the Tollemache, Helmingham or Lauderdale Orosius, and is kept at the British Library under the reference "Additional 47967". This manuscript was written in Wessex between about 892 and 925, possibly at Winchester. The second manuscript dates from early in the 11th century, is of unknown English provenance, and is kept at the British Library under the reference "Cotton Tiberius B. i". Both manuscripts are copies of a "common ancestor". (Note: There are fragments of two other copies: two folios are in the Bodleian Library of the University of Oxford, MS Eng. Hist. e.49, (30481), and a single folio is at the Vatican in Rome, MS Reg. Lat. 497. There are indications that further copies existed, including in Byzantium, but none are known to have survived.)

== Biography ==
Ohthere said that he lived furthest north of all Norwegians, and that his home was in "Halgoland", in the north of Norway, by the sea. Halgoland is identified in modern historiography as Hålogaland, a historical region of northern Norway comparable in area to the modern region of Nord-Norge. (Note: "North of Namdal lay Hálogaland, the 'Land of High Fire', under the aurora borealis. This region, which was probably only being colonised by Scandinavians in the eighth century, was inhospitable and for the most part north of the Arctic Circle. [Inhabitants were known as the] Háleygir [who] made a nod towards agricultural subsistence in scattered settlements in sheltered coves or islands but their main support lay in their ability to extort Arctic produce from the Sami.") While greater precision is impossible, suggested localities for Ohthere's home include Senja, Kvaløya, and the areas surrounding the Malangen fjord, all near Tromsø. (Note: "Archaeological excavations have shown that Norse settlements existed north of Troms [county] in Ohthere's time.") He claimed to be a leading man in his homeland, perhaps to be understood as a chieftain, and described himself as wealthy, owning 600 tame reindeer, of which six were "decoys" used for catching wild reindeer. Conversely, according to the report in the Old English Orosius, Ohthere "had not more than twenty horned cattle, and twenty sheep, and twenty swine, and the little that he ploughed he ploughed with horses." But his main wealth was in tax paid by the Finnas, or Sami people, of whom the highest-born paid 15 marten skins, 5 reindeer skins, 1 bear skin, 10 ambers of feathers, (Note: An amber is defined as a dry measure of 4 bushels, a bushel being a measure of 8 imperial gallons (36 L) wet or dry.) 1 coat of bear skin or otter skin and two ship's ropes, each 60 ells long, (Note: An ell is defined as the length of a grown man's arm from the elbow to the tip of the middle finger.) made of either whale skin or seal skin. (Note: Thorpe 1900, pp. 250–1 uses the word "rent" rather than "tax": the Old English Orosius uses the word "gafol", which has the meanings "tax, tribute, rent, interest". Whitaker 1981, pp. 5–6 uses the words "tribute" and "tax", and suggests that the Sami (to whom Whitaker refers as Lapps) paid Ohthere a fee to be able to trade their goods "for iron and other imported goods which their own environment lacked.")

Another source of Ohthere's wealth was the hunting of whales and walrus. He is reported as saying that his own land was best for whale-hunting, with walrus up to 7 ells long and whales mostly 50 ells long, and that with five men he had killed sixty of them in two days. While the killing of this number of whales in two days seems unlikely, historian Kjell-Olav Masdalen suggests that, rather than whales, Ohthere intended the number killed to refer to walrus; Janet Bately suggests that it might best be seen as an indication of how many whales could be caught in good conditions. (Note: The relevant sentence reads in full: "This whale [the walrus] is much less than other whales, it being not longer than seven ells; but in his own country is the best whale-hunting, there they are eight-and-forty ells long, and most of them fifty ells; of these he said that he and five others had killed sixty in two days.") Ropes of whale skin were of sufficient value to be included in the tax paid to Ohthere by the Sami, and Ohthere said that walrus had "very noble bones in their teeth", some of which he brought to King Alfred.

Anthropologist Ian Whitaker notes that Ohthere has been described as primarily a merchant, and that his visit to King Alfred has been connected with the king's plans for a navy, a desire to escape the Norwegian King Harald Fairhair, or a need to rebuild a lost fortune. Whitaker notes also that there is "no shred of evidence" to support any of these ideas, but for the fact that he had visited the trading centres of "Skiringshal" (sic) and Hedeby. Ohthere said that he had travelled north chiefly to hunt walrus, and his journey south to the Danish trading settlement of Hedeby, via the "port" of Sciringes heal, may have been a trading mission. There is no account of Ohthere's journey to Wessex or explanation for his visit to King Alfred.

== Ohthere's Norway ==
Ohthere's reported use of the term "Norway" (norðweg) in the earliest copy of the Old English Orosius pre-dates the earliest written Scandinavian use of the term, in the runic form "Nuruiak", on the 10th-century Jelling stones in Denmark by between 40 and 80 years. He describes Norway as being very long and very narrow, saying that it was about 60 miles (97 km) across "to the east", about 30 miles (48 km) across in the middle, and about 3 miles (5 km) across in the north. (Note: The mile was not commonly used as a measure of distance in 9th-century Scandinavia, and is probably used here as an interpretation of distances given by Ohthere.) While Ohthere is here referring broadly to the width of Norwegian territory between the sea and the mountains, the land described as being about 60 miles across "to the east" is probably to be understood as representing the modern Norwegian region of Vestlandet, in the south-west of the country.

The land of the Norwegians is further delineated through reference to their neighbours. Away from the sea, a wilderness of moors, or mountains, lay to the east and was inhabited by Finnas, a reference to the Sami people. Alongside the southern part of the land, on the other side of the mountains and continuing north, was Sweoland, the "land of the Svear", or Swedes. (Note: Einar Gunnar Birgisson maintains that the southern regions of modern Norway, Østlandet and most if not all of Sørlandet, were inhabited by people of Swedish origin by the late-9th century, though they may have considered themselves North Danes.) To the north of the Swedes was Cwenaland, the "land of the Cwenas", and to the north of the Norwegians was wasteland.

== Ohthere's travels ==
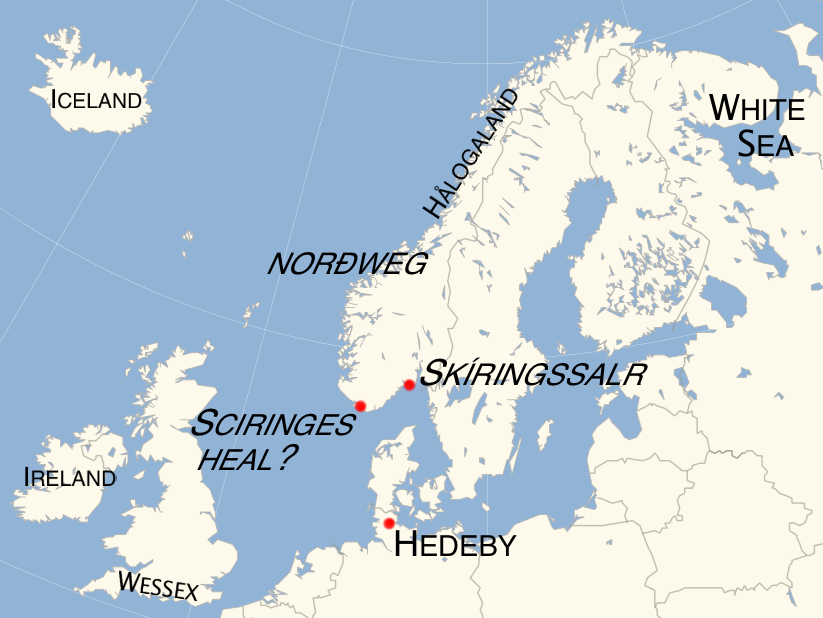
Map showing the principal places mentioned in Ohthere's account: modern scholarship has commonly identified Ohthere's Sciringes heal with Skíringssalr, a historical site near Larvik, but it may have been located slightly west of Lindesnes, the southern tip of modern Norway. Also it is unclear whether it is Ireland or Iceland that was mentioned in his original account.

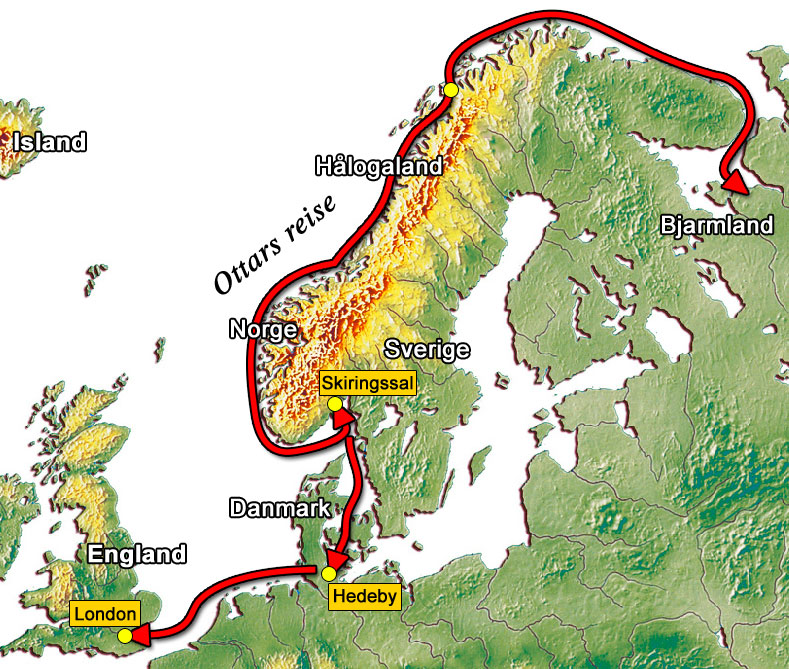
A Norwegian map of the voyages of Ohthere. The arrow pointing towards the southern coast of the White Sea conflicts with Ohthere's statement that "there was waste land all the way on his starboard side", and the port of London is an educated guess, but is not attested.

Ohthere described two journeys that he had made, one northward and around the Kola Peninsula into the White Sea, and one southward to the Danish trading settlement of Hedeby via a Norwegian "port" which, in the Old English Orosius, is called "Sciringes heal". He described his journeys partly through the lands and peoples he encountered, and partly through the number of days it took to sail from one point to the next:

[e]xperiments with replicas of Viking ships have shown that, somewhat depending on the hull form and cargo, under optimal conditions, with a cross wind or more to aft, they can hold an average speed of 6–8 knots over a day's voyage, and that they may reach speeds of 10–12 knots in a breeze. Moreover, they can maintain an effective speed of approximately 2 knots at 55–60° to the wind when tacking.

— Kjell-Olav Masdalen, "Uden Tvivl – med fuldkommen Ret Hvor lå Sciringes heal?", 2010 (Note: A knot is a measurement of speed in nautical miles per hour: 1 knot is equal to 1.852 km/h or about 1.15 mph. Tacking is a means by which a sailing vessel can be made to travel against the direction of the wind.)

=== Journey to the north ===
Ohthere said that the land stretched far to the north of his home, and that it was all wasteland, except for a few places where finnas (Sami) camped to hunt in the winter and fish in the summer. He said that he once wanted to find out how far the land extended to the north, (Note: Old English "hu longe þæt land norþryhte læge". Thorpe, whose translation was first published in 1853, interprets norþryhte as denoting a cardinal point and in the journey north translates it as "due north" three times; so also eastryhte "due east" (1x) and suþrihte "due south" (2x). This interpretation was apparently widespread in the 19th (and partly 20th) centuries and, supported by the angle of the Norwegian coastline to the N-S meridian, led to a theory of a special "Old Scandinavian orientation system" which shifted all the cardinal points clockwise by 45 (or even 60) degrees; its most outspoken defender was R. Ekblom. His theory was finally refuted in detail as "methodically inconsistent, impractical and historically improbable". Korhammer proved that in Old English the suffix –ryhte gave only a general direction and was etymologically comparable to German Richtung, while it was Old English rihte + geographic direction that stood for an exact cardinal point. Ohthere only uses it in ryhtnorþanwindes "wind from due north"; the adverb/prefix rihte here corresponds to German recht in recht voraus "straight ahead", rechtweisender Kurs "true course" and rechtweisend Nord "true north".) or if anyone lived north of the waste. He sailed north along the coast for three days, as far north as whale-hunters would go, and continued to travel north as far as he could sail in three days. Then the land there turned east (near North Cape), and he had to wait for a west wind and slightly north and then sailed east along the land for four days. Then he had to wait there for a wind from due north, for the land there turned to the south. He then sailed south along the land for another five days. There a large river stretched up into the land, and they turned up into that river because they dared not sail on beyond the river because of "unfrið" (usually translated as "hostility"), since the land was all settled on the other side of the river. He had not previously encountered any cultivated land since he travelled from his own home, but there was waste land all the way on his starboard side, except for fishermen and fowlers and hunters, and they were all finnas, and open sea had always been on his port side.

According to Ohthere, the far bank of the river was "well cultivated" and inhabited by Beormas: historian T.N. Jackson suggests a location for this land – "Bjarmaland" – in the vicinity of the present day Russian town of Kandalaksha, on the western side of the White Sea, while noting that others have identified Ohthere's "large river" as the Northern Dvina, on the eastern side of the White Sea, and place Bjarmaland accordingly. (Note: Jackson argues that an association with the Northern Dvina River is essentially a misinterpretation of a skaldic term "Vína", which was "used as a metaphoric description of a river in general." Historiographical localisations of Bjarmaland have varied greatly, including on both eastern and western sides of the White Sea, and from the White Sea to the Ural Mountains.) Having just explained how Ohthere did not dare enter the land of the Beormas because it was so well cultivated and because of "unfrið", the report of Ohthere's travels then indicates that he had spoken with them. He explained that the Beormas had told him much about their own land and those of their neighbours, but he says nothing further of this: "he knew not what was true, because he did not see it himself". This incongruity may be explained by his learning of these things from Beormas encountered elsewhere, or from Sami, whose language Ohthere reports as being almost the same as that of the Beormas. Historian Christine Fell suggests that the Old English Orosius' use of the word "unfrið" might rather indicate that Ohthere made a diplomatic approach to the Beormas because he had no trading agreement with them.

The Beormas have been linked with the Old Permic culture, for example through late-medieval treaties dealing with, among other things, a territory called Koloperem', a place-name which "must have emerged as a designation of a land of perem' [i.e. Beormas] on the Kola Peninsula": the latter forms the north-western coast of the White Sea, and is defined in part by an inlet of the sea leading to the town of Kandalaksha. The ethnicity of the Beormas and the Perm' remains uncertain, but the term "perem'" may have originated as a word used for nomadic tradesmen, rather than an ethnic group.

Possible answers to incongruities and questions connected with Ohthere's account of the journey to the north are offered in a recent contribution by Michael Korhammer. Most important of them is his proposal of a simple syntactical emendation of the traditional text after which the clause telling the killing of sixty (see above) will refer directly to the walruses, thus reducing Ohthere's mention of the big whales in Norway to a mere aside. The logical consequences of this (well substantiated) emendation, if accepted, would be that Ohthere was no whale-hunter at all, that his killing of the sixty walruses took place in the White Sea, and that a ship's crew of five (or six) men there would indicate the use of an early cargo-ship comparable to the later Skuldelev 1 or Skuldelev 3 ships. The author revives the old theory that Ohthere was an exile and had left Norway for good by pointing to the exclusive use of the Old English preterite tense regarding Ohthere's person; he sees King Alfred's interview with the Norwegian seafarer in the context of efforts to advance the economic recovery of the city of London.

=== Journey south to Hedeby ===
Ohthere's account of a journey to the Danish trading settlement of Hedeby, Old English æt hæþum "[port] at the heaths" and German Haithabu, begins with a reference to a place in the south of Norway named Sciringes heal, to which he said one could not sail [from his home in Hålogaland] in one month if one camped at night and each day had a fair [or: contrary] wind ("Þyder he cwæð þæt man ne mihte geseglian on anum monðe gyf man on niht wicode and ælce dæge hæfde ambyrne wind"). This sentence has very often been quoted in literature. Old English ambyrne (accusative singular masculine; the nominative would be ambyre) is a hapax legomenon in Old English. Since around 1600 the traditionally accepted rendering of the phrase in English has been, without ultimate proof, "fair/favourable wind" in translations and dictionaries; on the other hand only a handful of scholars have supported the meaning "contrary". (Note: In 1983 Alfred Bammesberger, an advocate of "favourable wind", postulated a Germanic root *bur-u > *bur-ja- (from Indo-European *bher- "carry") with the meaning "suitable"; for the prefix he assumed an original *an(a), claiming an intensifying function for it, and arrived at the meanings "favourable, appropriate, suitable, fitting" in Old English. In a later article he derived the adjecive from the Old English noun byre "time, opportunity", Germanic *ana-burja thus originally meaning "occurring at a favourable time". In 2016 Bammesberger narrowed ambyrne wind down to an "appropriate wind", relying here on John Pope, who in his edition of homilies by Abbot Aelfric had suggested the meanings "aptly, appropriately, opportunely" for the adverb amberlice, another Old English hapax legomenon and certaily cognate with ambyre. In opposition to this Michael Korhammer in two contributions based his theory of "contrary wind" on logical and nautical reasoning: a) "Camping at night" (= impediment to travelling, negative) in the conditional clause does not logically go together with the bonus of a positive wind; this was also W.A. Craigie's position in 1924. b) Assuming twelve hours per day for sailing, a moon month of 28 days, and a distance of roughly 1000 nautical miles would result in daily averages of less than 36 nautical miles and an average sailing speed of less than 3 knots = 3 nautical miles per hour = 5.5 km/h, which Korhammer regards as much too slow if ambyrne wind is really supposed to be a favourable breeze. He points to the high speeds attained by replicas of Viking ships (see Masdalen above) and record daily averages of 146 to 223 nautical miles by 19th-century Norwegian square-rigged boats. Etymology: From a comparison of words in Germanic languages that are etymologically connected with ambyre, Korhammer deduces that the original meaning of the Germanic root *bur- (cf. Bammesberger) must have been "to rise, to raise" (cf. Dutch beuren, German empor, empören), and that the etymology of ambyre is to be explained as *ana- [or] *and- + burja- "rising up against"; this negative meaning of "contrary, adverse", he claims, would also make better sense with amberlice in the context of Aelfric's homily. He bolsters his theory by two words in a German psalter of ca. 1200, anboriden and aneborende, which are recorded there as interlinear glosses over forms of Latin insurgere "rise up against".) In contrast to the account of his journey to the north ("He sailed north", "the land turned eastwards" etc.) and the voyage from Sciringes heal to Hedeby ("When he sailed", "before he came to Hedeby" etc.), Ohthere does not employ the past tense when he describes sailing south along the Norwegian coast; he does not report a story from his own viewpoint but speaks in general terms for an anonymous mariner: "One cannot sail", "if one camped at night", "he will sail", "to him will be at first", "until he comes". Michael Korhammer, a proponent of "contrary wind", concludes from this change of aspect that the ambyrne-wind-sentence is not about Ohthere's own travelling experience nor does it refer to normal sailing speeds in his period, as was often assumed by critics, but answers a question of King Alfred's court (see D. Whitelock above) about distances, "how long is the North Way?", or "how long is it from your home to the south?". Korhammer claims that Ohthere here uses the worst-case scenario of a theoretical sailing voyage lasting longer than one month for a description of the very great length of the Norwegian coast-line to his Anglo-Saxon audience. This interpretation is strengthened by the immediately following sentence "and all the time he will sail be lande", and later when the mariner comes to Sciringes heal, by "and all the way on the port side North Way".

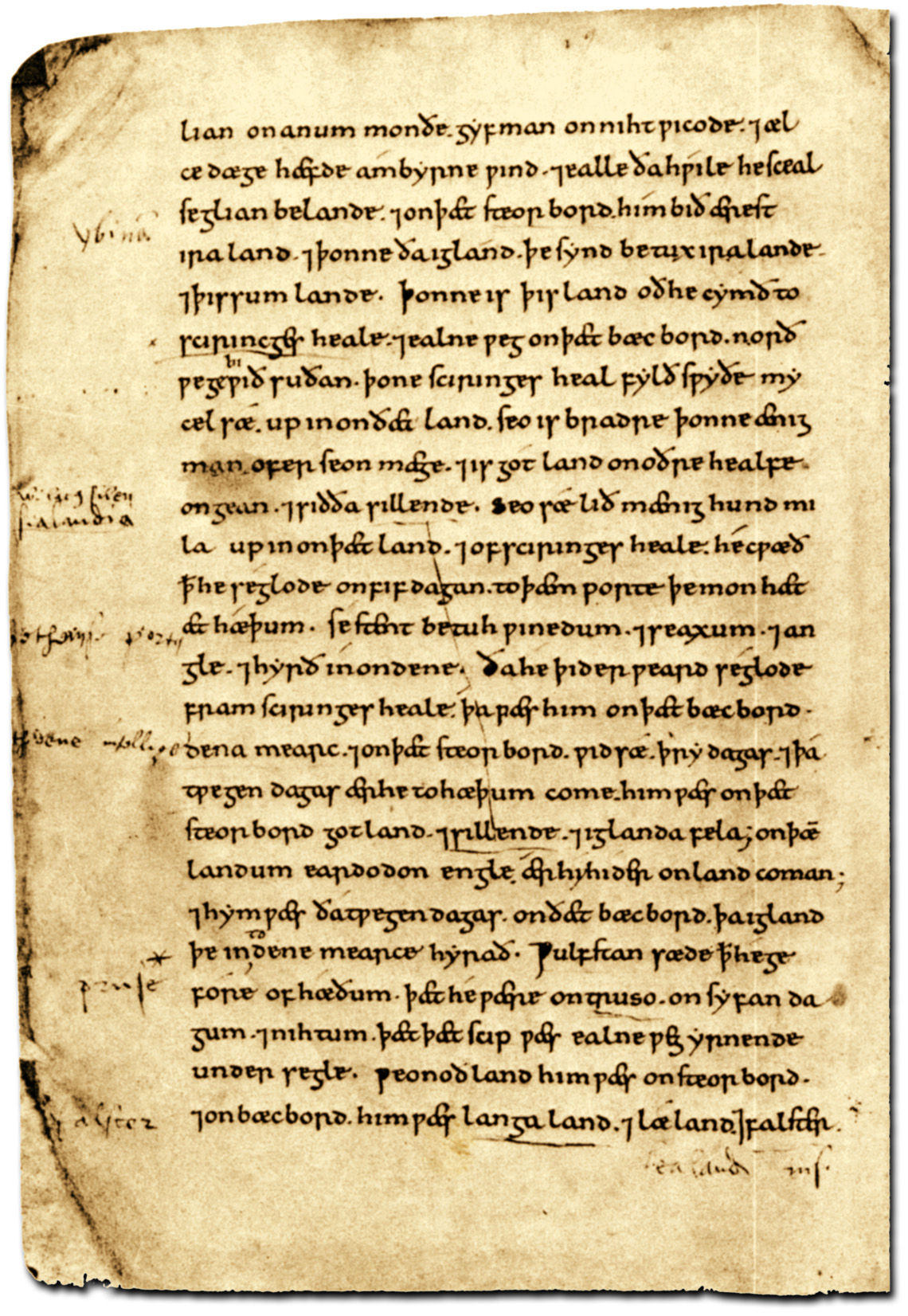
Page from the 11th-century copy of the Old English Orosius (BL Cotton Tiberius B.i) featuring the place-names Denmark (dena mearc), Norway (norðweg), Iraland and Sciringes heal

While sailing along the Norwegian coast, the mariner will first have "Iraland" to starboard, then the islands between "Iraland" and Britain, and finally Britain itself until he comes to Sciringes heal. The principal interpretations of "Iraland" in the Old English Orosius are that it might mean either Ireland or Iceland. While it is possible that the original text of Ohthere's account read "Isaland", for "Iceland", and that the "s" was at some point replaced by "r", geographically the circumstances described are better suited for Iceland than for Ireland. Alternatively, given that "Iraland" occurs in the same form, with an "r", twice on the same manuscript page, and given that Ohthere was a seafarer, it may be that he was describing sea-routes to Ireland and Britain rather than actual directions, with no thought for Iceland. Britain, or England, is regarded as self-evident, represented in Ohthere's account through the phrase "this land" (þis land): Ohthere is reported as giving his account in person to King Alfred of Wessex.

Sciringes heal has been held to represent Skiringssal (Old Norse: Skíringssalr) in almost all relevant historical writing since the early 19th century, mainly by reason of the superficial similarity of the names, to the extent that some modern translations of Ohthere's account feature the name "Skiringssal" in place of "Sciringes heal". Skiringssal is a historical location, mentioned in Scandinavian sagas, which has been identified with some certainty as an area comparable to the Tjølling prestegjeld, a little over 3 miles (5 km) east of Larvik, with important Viking Age archaeological sites at Huseby, just south of Tjølling, and at Kaupang, near the shoreline south-west of Tjølling, in the south-eastern county of Vestfold in modern Norway. (Note: While the place-name "Huseby" indicates a location historically connected with kings and chieftains, the place-name "Kaupang" represents an Old Norse word "kaupangr", meaning "market" or "trading place". The archaeological discovery of a Viking Age trading place at Kaupang has been taken as ipso facto confirmation that this was Ohthere's Sciringes heal, for example by Charlotte Blindheim, the lead archaeologist involved.) An alternative view is that an identification of Sciringes heal with Skiringssal is impossible to reconcile with the detail of Ohthere's account, and is unlikely for historical and linguistic reasons. (Note: Geographically, whereas Ohthere only mentions sailing southwards to Sciringes heal, with Britain ultimately on the starboard side, a journey from Hålogaland to the vicinity of Larvik would also involve subsequently sailing east and north, with Britain no longer on the starboard side. Historically, whereas Ohthere said that he had Norway to port all the way to Sciringes heal, and only drew alongside Denmark after leaving Sciringes heal, what is now south-eastern Norway was probably part of the kingdom of Denmark towards the end of the 9th century, as far west as Lindesnes at the southernmost extremity of modern Norway. Linguistically, the "heal" in "Sciringes heal" is grammatically a masculine word in the Old English Orosius, indicating "healh", a word referring to a feature of the landscape. Conversely the "sal" in "Skíringssalr" is an Old Norse word referring to a building: while proponents of an identification between Sciringes heal and "Skíringssalr" have understood the word "heal" to be the Old English word "heall", for "hall", this word is feminine; and, if a translation for "sal" were intended in the Old English Orosius, then the Old English cognate "sele" was available.) According to this interpretation, a location for Sciringes heal west of Lindesnes, the southernmost extremity of Norway, is to be preferred, perhaps at Lunde on the Lista peninsula. Whether Sciringes heal was identical with Skiringssal, or was located in Tjølling parish or west of Lindesnes, it is described in Ohthere's account in the Old English Orosius as a "port" (an port). Ohthere's account uses the same word for the Danish trading settlement of Hedeby (þæm porte), suggesting that Sciringes heal may have been similar in nature, though the Old English word "port" can signify nothing more than a haven. (Note: Citing Janet Bately, Kjell-Olav Masdalen notes that the Old English word "port" may not have been in the Norwegian Ohthere's vocabulary.)

When Ohthere sailed on from Sciringes heal, he reported having first had Denmark to port and a wide sea to starboard for three days, after which for two days he had islands belonging to Denmark on his port side and Jutland (Gotland and Sillende) and many islands to starboard, before arriving at Hedeby, which lay at the head of the Schlei inlet in what was then south-eastern Denmark. It is in Ohthere's description of this part of the journey that the earliest copy of the Old English Orosius gives the first known mention of the term "Denmark", in the form "dena mearc". However, his first reference to Denmark being on his port side presumably makes reference to areas of the 9th-century Danish kingdom that lay on the Scandinavian peninsula. (Note: A detailed discussion of Ohthere's possible route from Sciringes heal to Hedeby is at Masdalen 2010, pp. 76–9.)

The reason for Ohthere's visit to King Alfred of Wessex is not recorded. There is also no mention in the Old English Orosius of how recent the journeys were when Ohthere described them to the king, where the meeting took place, or the route by which Ohthere arrived in southern England.

== In modern culture ==
Ohthere's audience with King Alfred is dramatised in Henry Wadsworth Longfellow's poem "The Discoverer of the North Cape: A Leaf from King Alfred's Orosius", and Ohthere and his journey appear in the 1957 novel The Lost Dragon of Wessex by Gwendolyn Bowers.

In Vladimir Nabokov's postmodern novel Pale Fire, the poet John Shade alludes to Ohthere, joking that the Norwegian's name derives from how King Alfred would greet him ('Oh there you are again!').

Ohthere is portrayed by Ray Stevenson in the historical drama Vikings.

== Bibliography ==
- Dictionary of Old English: A to I online (2018), ed. A. Cameron, A. Crandell Amos, A. diPaolo Healey et al., Toronto, doe.utoronto.ca
- Allport, Ben (2020), "Home Thoughts of Abroad: Ohtere's Voyage in its Anglo-Saxon Context", Early Medieval Europe, 64 (28): 256–288, doi:10.1111/emed.12395, hdl:11250/2762330, S2CID 216214005
- Appleton, Helen (2025), 'Ohthere and Wulfstan: A Short Introduction', ROEP: Resources for Old English Prose, University of Oxford
- Bammesberger, A. (1983), "The Old English adjective ambyre", English Studies, 64 (2): 97–101, doi:10.1080/00138388308598236
- Bammesberger, A. (2011), "Old English ambyre Revisited", NOWELE, 60/61: 39–44, doi:10.1075/nowele.60-61
- Bammesberger, A. (2016), "The Meaning of Old English ambyrne wind and the Adverb amberlice", News & Queries, 63 (2): 179–80, doi:10.1093/notesj/gjw074
- Bately, J., ed. (1980). The Old English Orosius. Early English Text Society, Supplementary Series 6. Oxford University Press. ISBN 9780197224069.
- Bately, J.; Englert, A., eds. (2007). Ohthere's Voyages: a Late 9th-Century Account of Voyages along the Coasts of Norway and Denmark and its Cultural Context. Maritime Culture of the North 1. Roskilde. ISBN 9788785180476.
- Birgisson, E.G. (2008), "National historiographies and the Viking Age: A re-examination", Aust-Agder-Arv Årbok 2008, Aust-Agder Kulturhistorike Senter, OCLC 759728174, archived from the original on 15 February 2012 (link is to contents page with further link to downloadable PDF)
- Brink, S. (2007), "Skiringssal, Kaupang, Tjølling – the toponymic evidence", in Skre, D. (ed.), Kaupang in Skiringssal, Aarhus University, pp. 53–64, ISBN 9788779342590
- Ekblom, R. (1930), "Ohthere's voyage from Skiringssal to Hedeby", Studia Neophilologica, 12 (2): 177–190, doi:10.1080/00393273908586845
- Fell, C.E. (1982), "Unfriþ: An approach to a definition" (PDF), Saga-Book of the Viking Society for Northern Research, 21 (1–2), OCLC 760237349
- Helle, K. (1991), "Tiden fram til 1536", in Danielsen, R.; Dyrvik, S.; Grønlie, T.; Helle, K.; Hovland, E. (eds.), Grunntrekk i Norsk Historie: Fra vikingtid til våre dager, Universitetsforlaget, pp. 13–106, ISBN 978-82-00-21273-7
- Iverson, F. (2011), "The beauty of bona regalia and the growth of supra-regional powers in Scandinavia", in Sigmundsson, S. (ed.), Viking Settlements and Viking Society Papers from the Proceedings of the Sixteenth Viking Congress, University of Iceland, pp. 225–44, ISBN 978-9979-54-923-9
- Jackson, T.N. (2002), "Bjarmaland revisited", Acta Borealia, 19 (2): 165–179, doi:10.1080/080038302321117579, S2CID 218661115
- Keynes, S.; Lapidge, M., eds. (1983), Alfred the Great: Asser's Life of King Alfred and Other Contemporary Sources, Penguin, ISBN 0-14-044409-2
- Korhammer, M. (1985a), "Viking Seafaring and the Meaning of Ohthere's ambyrne wind", in Bammesberger, A. (ed.), Problems of Old English Lexicography: Studies in Memory of Angus Cameron, Regensburg F. Pustet, pp. 151–73, ISBN 9783791709925
- Korhammer, M. (1985b), "The orientation system in the Old English Orosius: shifted or not?", in Lapidge, M.; Gneuss, H. (eds.), Learning and Literature in Anglo-Saxon England: Studies Presented to Peter Clemoes on the Occasion of his Sixty-Fifth Birthday, Cambridge University Press, pp. 251–69, ISBN 978-0-521-12871-1
- Korhammer, M. (2017), "Ambyrne wind, amberlice and byre in the DOE Online", Anglo-Saxon England, 46: 97–114, doi:10.1017/S0263675118000054, S2CID 167046040
- Korhammer, M. (2022), "Ohthere's Northern Voyage: A Close Reading and Practical Interpretation", Viking and Medieval Scandinavia, 18: 113–148, doi:10.1484/J.VMS.5.132124
- Malone, K. (1933), "On King Alfred's geographical treatise", Speculum, 8 (1): 67–78, doi:10.2307/2846850, JSTOR 2846850, S2CID 161276707
- Masdalen, K.-O. (2010), "Uden Tvivl – med fuldkommen Ret. Hvor lå Sciringes heal?" (PDF), Kuben, archived (PDF) from the original on 13 August 2019
- Pope, J.C., ed. (1967–1968). Homilies of Aelfric: a Supplementary Collection, 2 vols. Early English Text Society 259–60. Oxford University Press.
- Thorpe, B., ed. (1900), The Life of Alfred The Great Translated From The German of Dr. R. Pauli To Which Is Appended Alfred's Anglo-Saxon Version of Orosius, Bell, Internet Archive (instantly readable, includes parallel edition of Old English Orosius and Modern English translation)
- Toller, T. N., ed. (1898). An Anglo-Saxon Dictionary based on the Manuscript Collections of the late Joseph Bosworth. Oxford University Press.
- Toller, T. N., ed. (1921). An Anglo-Saxon Dictionary based on the Manuscript Collections of the late Joseph Bosworth. Oxford University Press.
- Bosworth-Toller (1972), An Anglo-Saxon Dictionary based on the Manuscript Collections of Joseph Bosworth: Enlarged Addenda and Corrigenda to the Supplement by A. Campbell, Oxford University Press
- Waggoner, Ben (2012). The Hrafnista Sagas. New Haven, CT: Troth Publications. ISBN 978-0557729418. (In the appendix: Ohthere's Voyage, pp. 187–190)
- Waite, G. (2000), Annotated Bibliographies of Old and Middle English Literature VI. Old English Prose Translations of King Alfred's Reign, Brewer, ISBN 0-85991-591-3
- Whitaker, I. (1981), "Ohthere's account reconsidered", Arctic Anthropology, 18 (1)
- Whitelock, D. (1966), "The prose of Alfred's reign", in Stanley, E.G. (ed.), Continuations and Beginnings: Studies in Old English Literature, Nelson, pp. 67–103, OCLC 367426
- Woolf, A. (2007), From Pictland to Alba 789–1070, Edinburgh University, ISBN 978-0-7486-1233-8
