= Charlotte Blindheim =

Norwegian archaeologist (1917–2005)

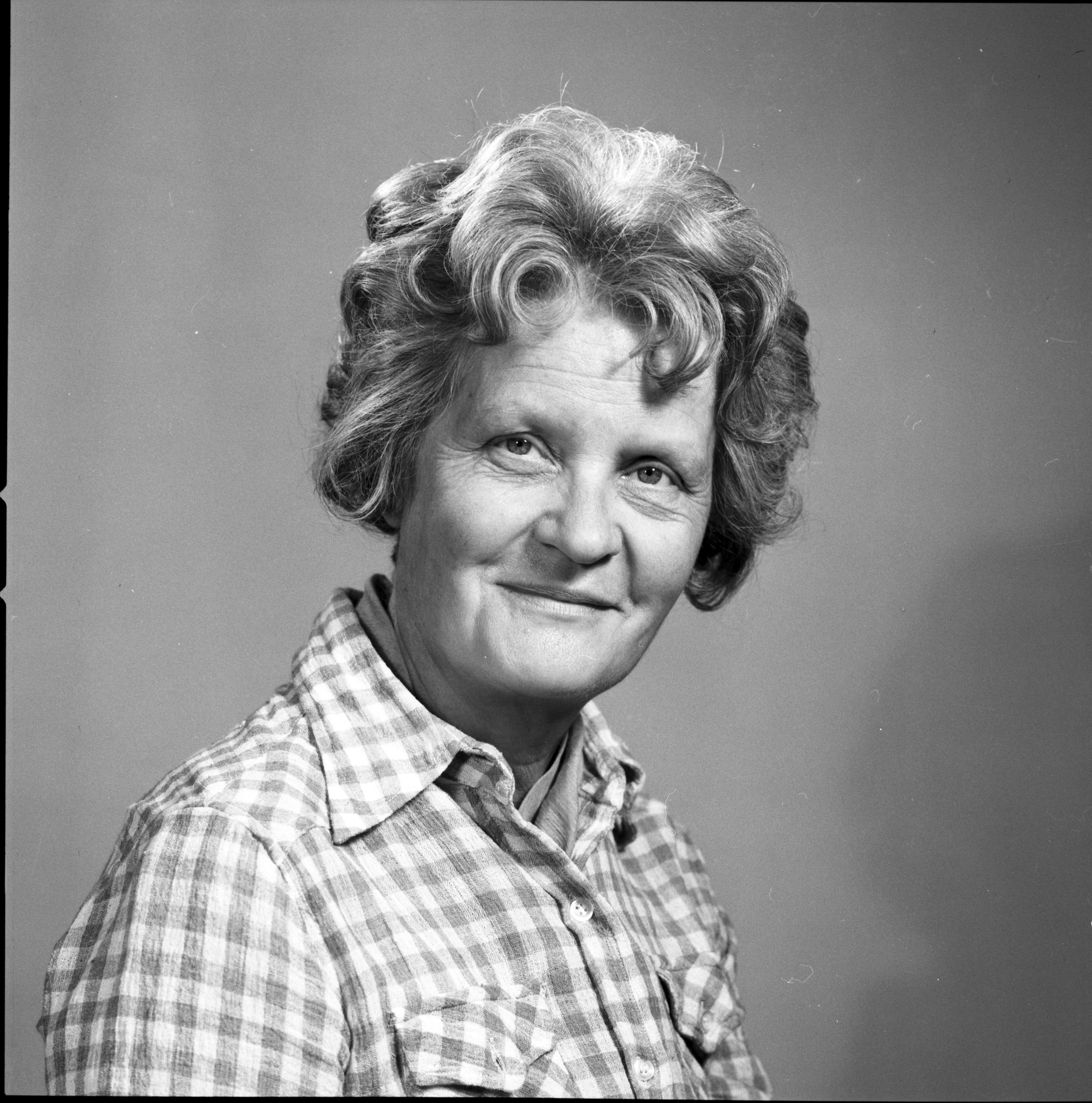
- Charlotte Blindheim
- Born: 6 July 1917; Oslo, Norway
- Died: 5 March 2005; Oslo, Norway
- Occupations: Archaeologist; Museum curator

Academic background
- Education: University of Oslo

Academic work
- Discipline: Archaeology
- Sub-discipline: Viking archaeology
- Institutions: University of Oslo

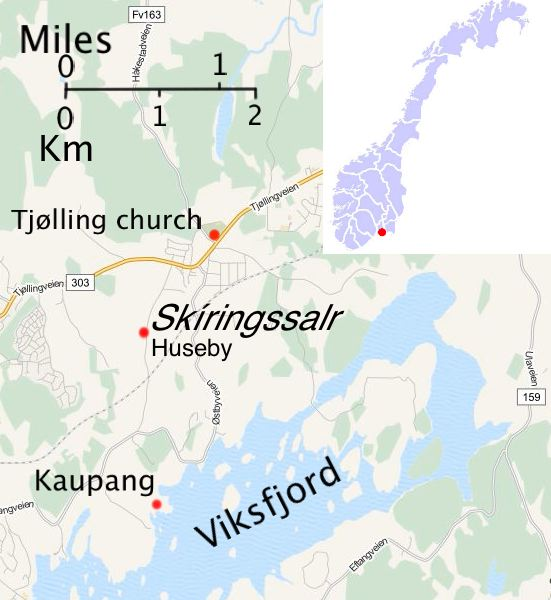
Site of Kaupang in Skiringssal on Viksfjord

Charlotte Blindheim (née Undset, 6 July 1917 – 5 March 2005) was a Norwegian archaeologist. She was the first female member of the scientific staff at the University of Oslo to be permanently employed when she hired as the museum curator in 1946.

== Biography ==
She was born in Kristiania (now Oslo), Norway. She was the daughter of Sigge Pantzerhielm Thomas (1886-1944) and Signe Dorothea Undset (1887-1973). Her father was a classical philologist and lecturer at the University of Oslo. She completed a master's degree in archaeology in 1946 at the University of Oslo, writing her thesis on Viking costume and jewellery. She was subsequently hired as a curator at the University as the museum's first permanently employed female member of scientific staff.

As an archaeologist, Blindheim became particularly known for her work with the excavations at Kaupang in Skiringssal in the former Tjølling Municipality (now in Larvik Municipality in Vestfold). Excavations were started systematically in the spring of 1950 and continued until the first half of the 1970s. In 1968 she became a curator in Vestfold, a position which she retained until her retirement in 1987.

== Awards ==
Blindheim received the King's Medal of Merit (Kongens fortjenstmedalje) in gold during 1987.

== Personal life ==
Blindheim was the maternal granddaughter of archaeologist, Ingvald Undset (1853-1893) and the niece of novelist Sigrid Undset, who was awarded the Nobel Prize in Literature for 1928. She was married to medieval art historian Martin Edvard Blindheim (1916-2009). She died during 2005 and was buried at Vår Frelsers gravlund in Oslo.

== Selected works ==
- Blindheim, Charlotte; (1953) Kaupang : markedsplassen i skiringssal (Oslo: Norsk arkeologisk selskap)
- Blindheim, Charlotte; Tollnes, Roar L. (1972) Kaupang: Vikingenes Handelsplass (Oslo: Mortensen) ISBN 9788252700558
- Blindheim, Charlotte; (1977) Vikingtog og vikintid : en innføring i bilder og tekst for undervisningsbruk (Oslo: Schibsted Forlag) ISBN 8251605997
- Blindheim, C.; Heyerdahl-Larsen, B., and Ingstaf, A. S. (1998) Kaupang-funnene, Volume 2, Part 1 (Oslo: University of Oslo) ISBN 9788271811129
