= Hem, Norway =

Village in Larvik, Norway

Hem
- Village
- Interactive map of Hem
- Coordinates: 59.075°N 10.198°E
- Country: Norway
- Region: Eastern Norway
- County: Vestfold
- District: Vestfold
- Municipality: Larvik Municipality

Area
  - Total: 0.36 km^{2} (0.14 sq mi)
- Elevation: 11 m (36 ft)

Population (2026)
  - Total: 628
  - Density: 1,744/km^{2} (4,520/sq mi)
- Time zone: UTC+01:00 (CET)
  - Summer (DST): UTC+02:00 (CEST)
- Post Code: 3280 Tjodalyng

Hem is a village in Larvik Municipality in Vestfold county, Norway. It is in the far eastern part of the municipality, along the border with Sandefjord Municipality. It is about 5 kilometres (3.1 mi) to the east of the village of Tjøllingvollen and about 5 kilometres (3.1 mi) north of the coastal village of Ula. The town of Sandefjord lies about 6 kilometres (3.7 mi) to the north of Hem.

The village has an area of 0.36-square-kilometre (89-acre) and a population (2026) of 628, and a population density of 1,744 inhabitants per square kilometre (4,520/sq mi).

== History ==
The village of Hem was a part of Tjølling Municipality until 1988 when it became part of Larvik Municipality.
