= Ula, Norway =

Village in Larvik, Norway

Ula
- Village
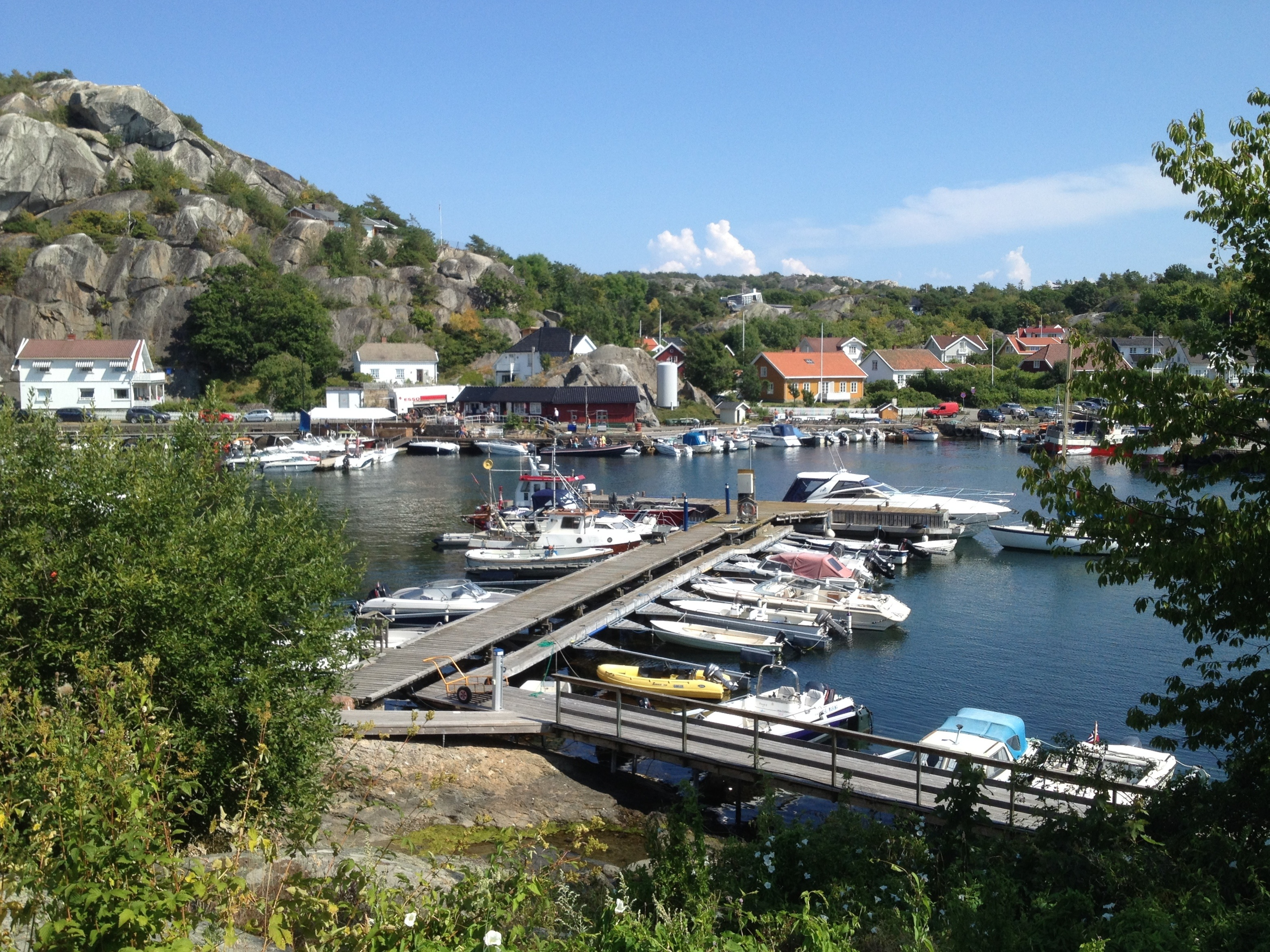
- View of the village harbour
- Interactive map of Ula
- Coordinates: 59.02523°N 10.18465°E
- Country: Norway
- Region: Eastern Norway
- County: Vestfold
- District: Vestfold
- Municipality: Larvik Municipality

Area
  - Total: 0.28 km^{2} (0.11 sq mi)
- Elevation: 0 m (0 ft)

Population (2002)
  - Total: 228
  - Density: 810/km^{2} (2,100/sq mi)
- Time zone: UTC+01:00 (CET)
  - Summer (DST): UTC+02:00 (CEST)
- Post Code: 3280 Tjodalyng

Ula is a small seaside village in Larvik Municipality in Vestfold county, Norway. The village is located in the Tjølling area of the municipality. It is located about 5 kilometres (3.1 mi) to the south of the village of Hem and about 5 kilometres (3.1 mi) to the southeast of the village of Tjøllingvollen.

The 0.28-square-kilometre (69-acre) village had a population (2000) of 228 and a population density of 814 inhabitants per square kilometre (2,110/sq mi). Since 2002, the population and area data for this village area has not been separately tracked by Statistics Norway because the population dropped below 200 people.

The village and harbour become busier during summer months, due to an influx of people occupying Ula's many vacation homes and campgrounds. A number of protected and preserved 18th-century wooden homes are located along the main beach.

== Tourism ==
Ula is located along the Vestfold coast about halfway between the cities of Sandefjord and Larvik. It is a popular summer holiday destination surrounded by cabins and vacation homes. The sandy beach at Ula is one of the longest in the region. The sheltered harbour caters to pleasure craft and a small commercial fishing fleet. Towards Kjerringvik, there are large recreational areas made available to the public by Oslofjordens Friluftsråd, a council for the advancement of outdoor activities, in partnership with the national government and the local Larvik municipal government.

The village was historically a pilot station, and it is linked to the pilot "Ulabrand" (Anders Jacob Johansen), who ran his business from Ula and died in the waters off its coast in November 1881. A monument in his memory has been erected on the hill right above where he lived.
