= Kaupang =

Viking Age village in Norway

Coordinates: 59°01′51″N 10°06′27″E

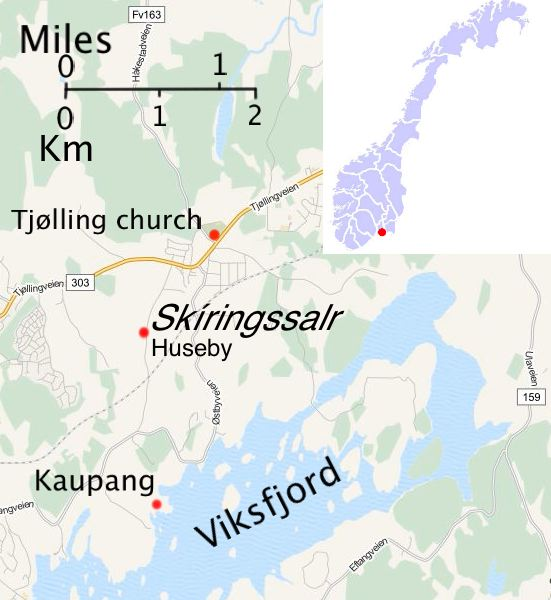
Map showing locations of Kaupang, Skíringssalr (Huseby) and Tjølling in Vestfold county, Norway, with location in Norway inset.

Kaupang was a Viking Age village that is generally considered to be the first town/marketplace in Norway. It is located near the present-day village of Tjøllingvollen in Larvik Municipality in Vestfold county, Norway. The village of Kaupang was located along the Viksfjorden, a branch off the main Larviksfjorden. The ancient Viking hall, Skiringssal, was located just inland from the fjord. Kaupang was an important merchant and craft center during the Viking Age and as yet the first known Norwegian trading outpost.

Kaupang is the site of the remains of one of Scandinavia's earliest urban sites, established in year 800. Kaupang was abandoned in the mid-10th century. Kaupang has been described as Norway's most important monument from the Viking Age.

== Name ==
The name Kaupang was the Old Norse term for market-place composed of kaup- (which means "buy") and angr (which means "fjord harbor"), hence the name means something like "buy fjord" or "buy harbor" (similar to the literal translation of Copenhagen).

== History ==
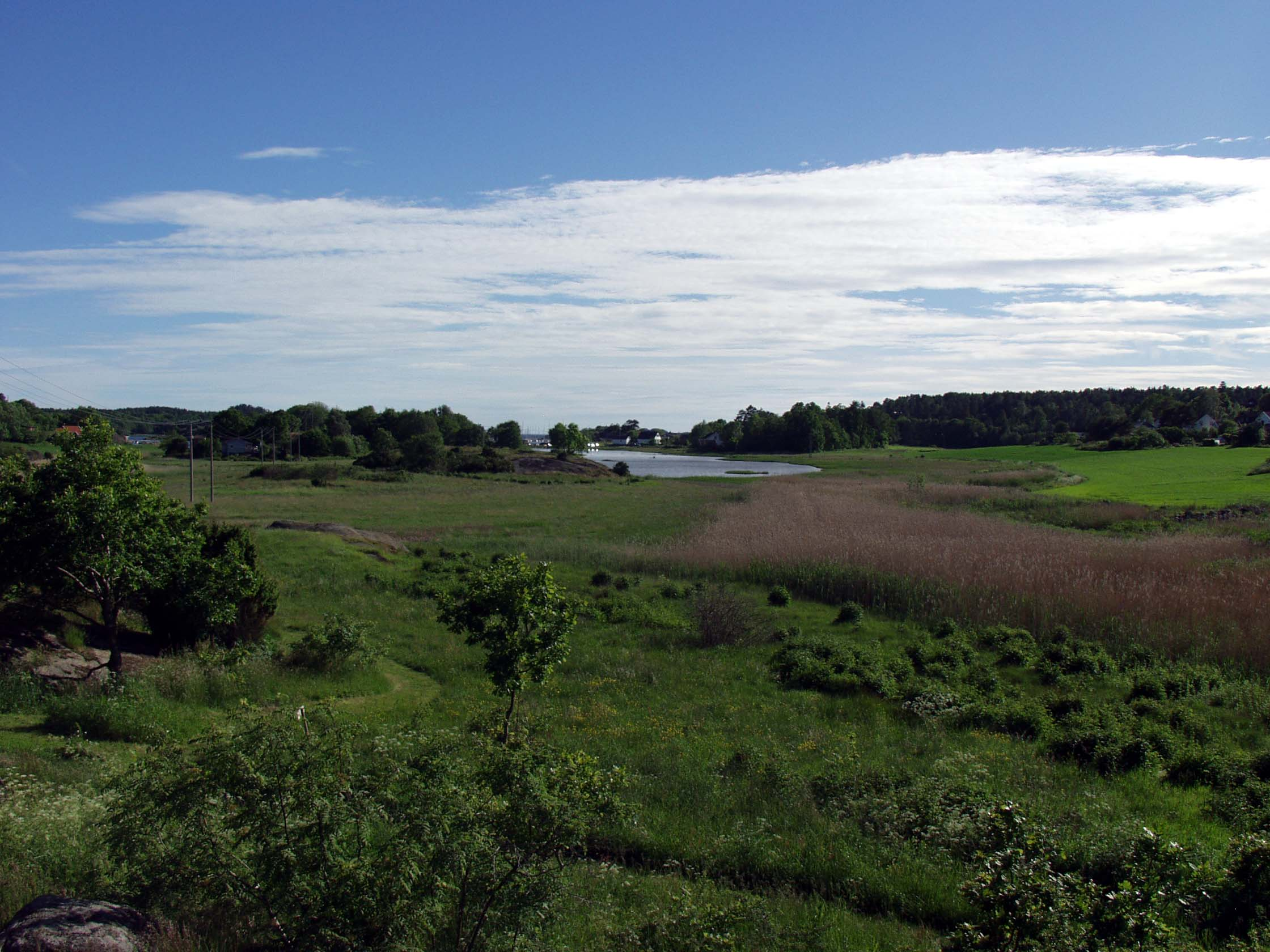
Kaupang seen from nearby Bikjholberget

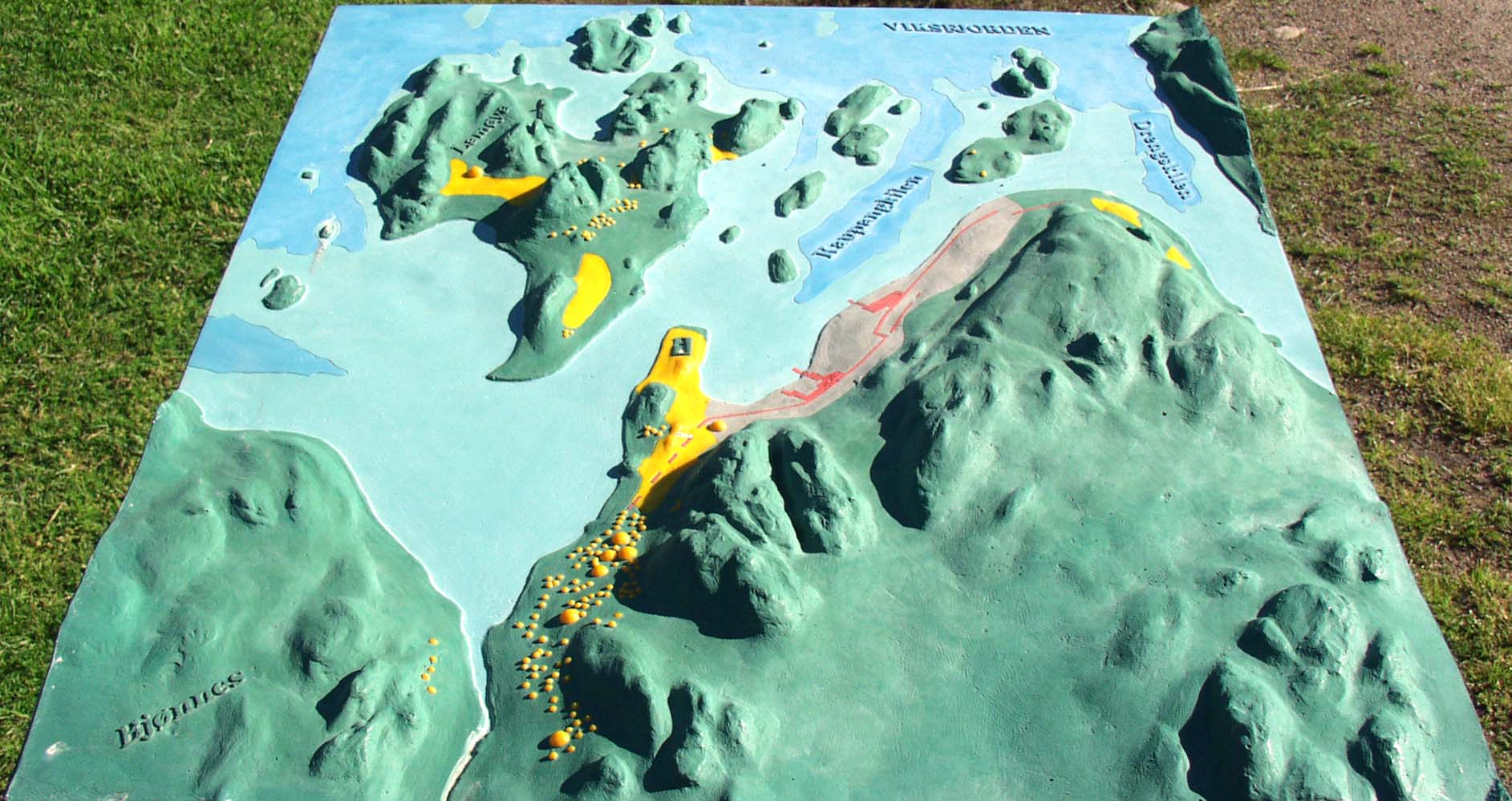
Model of the Viking town Kaupang

Kaupang was founded in the 780s and abandoned for unknown reasons in the early 10th century. It was situated on a beach by Viksfjord in Larvik Municipality. Documentary sources indicate that the area was an important royal seat in the 8th and 9th centuries.

There is a general perception that Kaupang is mentioned under the name of Skiringssal (Old Norse: Skíringssalr) in Ohthere of Hålogaland's account of his travels. But the name of the port Ohthere visited at the end of the 9th century is only recorded as "Sciringes heal" in Old English, and there is no scientific evidence that "Sciringes heal" corresponded to Kaupang in Skiringssal.

== Excavation ==
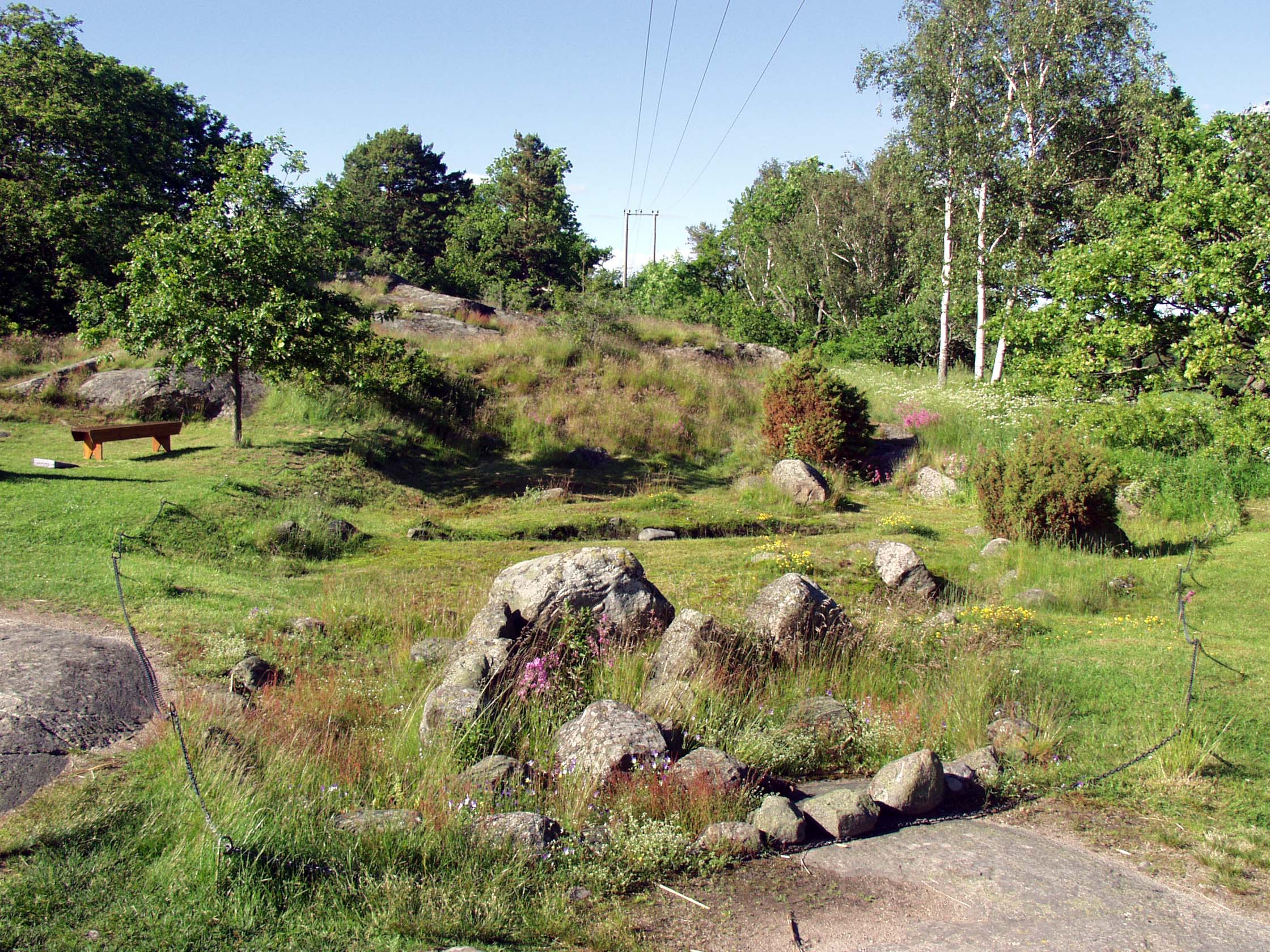
Excavation field east of Kaupang

Archaeological evidence indicates that the site might have been the first proto-urban settlement of some significance in Norway. The excavations which have been conducted at Kaupang have found evidence for a handicraft and commercial center, with around 1,000 inhabitants. The settlement had diverse craft production and extensive trade with foreign countries. Commodities traded included iron, soapstone and perhaps fish.

In 1867 Nicolay Nicolaysen conducted the first excavations of the area, mapping one of the grave-fields around the settlement and excavating 79 grave mounds. He also uncovered a cremation cemetery, largely dated to the 10th century. Charlotte Blindheim started excavating in 1947 and completed her last publication in 1999, and Dagfinn Skre and his associates undertook a new program of work at Kaupang in 1997.

In the summer of 2000, the Institute for Archaeology, Conservation and Historical Studies at the University of Oslo began a new excavation program at Kaupang, under the direction of Dagfinn Skre, which ran until 2002, and a smaller excavation was conducted in Kaupang's harbour area in 2003. In total, four possible houses were uncovered, as were a number of hearths, pits and postholes. Following the excavations, scholars worked on analysing both artifacts and environmental samples from the excavations.

The results from the post-excavation work have been published in a series of three books, the first of which became available in 2007, the last being published in 2011. Many of the approximately 100,000 finds from excavations have been on display at the University of Oslo, including Arab silver coins, gold coin from Dorestad, hundreds of glass beads, gold and bronze jewelry, pottery, weapons, and tools

== See also ==
- Kjøpstad
- Köping
- Købstad
- Copenhagen
- Kaupanger

== Other sources ==
- Blindheim, Charlotte; Tollnes, Roar (1972). Kaupang: Vikingenes handelsplass (in Norwegian). Norway: Mortensen. ISBN 9788252700558.
- Helle, Knut; Eliassen, Finn-Einar; Myhre, Jan Eivind; Svein Stugu, Ola (2006). Norsk Byhistorie (in Norwegian). Oslo: Pax forlag. ISBN 9788253028828.
- Skre, Dagfinn; Stylegar, Frans-Arne (2008). Kaupang the Viking town. Oslo, Norge: Jac Trykk AS. ISBN 8280840184.
- Skre, Dagfinn, ed. (2007). Kaupang in Skiringssal (in Norwegian). Kaupang Excavation Projekt Publication. ISBN 9788779342590.
