= Arild Lund =

Norwegian politician (born 1940)

Member of the Norwegian Parliament for Vestfold
- In office 1993–1997

Assembly Member for Councillor, Tjølling Municipal Council
- In office 1967–1975

Assembly Member for Deputy mayor, Tjølling Municipal Council
- In office 1975–1979

Assembly Member for Deputy member, Vestfold County Council
- In office 1971–1979

Assembly Member for Councillor, Tjølling Municipal Council
- In office 1979–1987

Assembly Member for Mayor, Larvik Municipal Council
- In office 1987–1991

Assembly Member for Deputy member, Vestfold County Council
- In office 1991–1995

Personal details
- Born: March 4, 1940 (age 86) Tjølling Municipality
- Citizenship: Norway
- Party: Conservative Party

Arild Lund (born 4 March 1940) is a Norwegian politician for the Conservative Party.

He was elected to the Norwegian Parliament from Vestfold in 1993, but was not re-elected in 1997.

Born in Tjølling Municipality, Lund was a member of the municipal council of Tjølling Municipality from 1967 to 1987, except for the term 1975–1979, serving as deputy mayor in 1971–1975 and mayor in 1979–1983. He then became mayor of its successor Larvik Municipality from 1987 to 1991. He was also a deputy member of Vestfold county council from 1971–1979 and 1991–1995.
