= Ohthere's Voyages =

2007 non-fiction book edited by Janet Bately and Anton Englert

Ohthere's Voyages: A Late 9th-century Account of Voyages along the Coasts of Norway and Denmark and its Cultural Context
- Editor: Janet Bately; Anton Englert
- Publisher: Viking Ship Museum (Roskilde)
- Publication date: 2007
- ISBN: 9788785180476

Ohthere's Voyages: A Late 9th-century Account of Voyages along the Coasts of Norway and Denmark and its Cultural Context is a book of essays about the voyages of Ohthere of Hålogaland. It was published in 2007 by the Viking Ship Museum and edited by Janet Bately and Anton Englert.
