= Tjølling Municipality =

Former municipality in Vestfold, Norway

Tjølling Municipality Tjølling kommune
- Former municipality
- Tjølling herred (historic name)
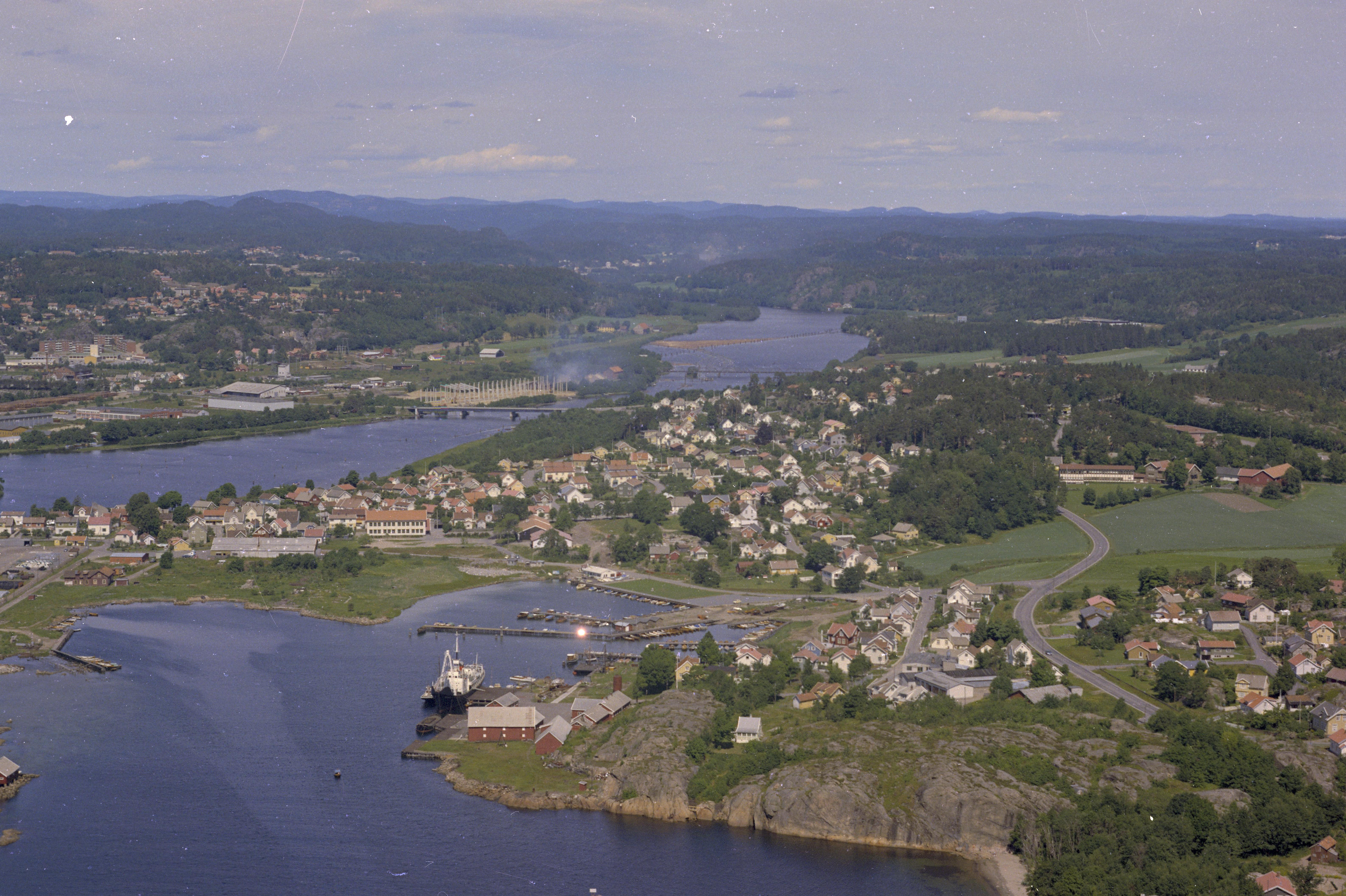
- View of Tjølling

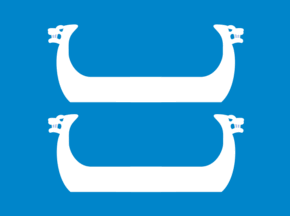
- Flag Coat of arms

- Vestfold within Norway

- Tjølling within Vestfold
- Coordinates: 59°03′24″N 10°07′32″E
- Country: Norway
- County: Vestfold
- Established: 1 Jan 1838
  - Created as: Formannskapsdistrikt
- Disestablished: 1 Jan 1988
  - Succeeded by: Larvik Municipality
- Administrative centre: Tjøllingvollen

Government
  - Mayor (1980–1987): Arild Lund (H)

Area (upon dissolution)
  - Total: 69.6 km^{2} (26.9 sq mi)
  - Rank: #413 in Norway
- Highest elevation (Kjerringberget): 117 m (384 ft)

Population (1987)
  - Total: 7,878
  - Rank: #129 in Norway
  - Density: 113.2/km^{2} (293/sq mi)
  - Change (10 years): ▲ +8.6%
- Demonym: Tjøllingsokning

Official language
  - Norwegian form: Bokmål
- Time zone: UTC+01:00 (CET)
  - Summer (DST): UTC+02:00 (CEST)
- ISO 3166 code: NO-0725

Tjølling (Norwegian pronunciation: [ˈçœlːɪŋ]; locally [ˈʃœlːɪŋ]) is a former municipality in Vestfold county, Norway. The 69.6-square-kilometre (26.9 sq mi) municipality existed from 1838 until its dissolution in 1988. The area is now part of Larvik Municipality. The administrative centre was the village of Tjøllingvollen. Other villages in Tjølling included Hem, Rekkevik, and Ula.

Prior to its dissolution in 1988, the 69.6-square-kilometre (26.9 sq mi) municipality was the 413th largest by area out of the 454 municipalities in Norway. Tjølling Municipality was the 129th most populous municipality in Norway with a population of about 7,878. The municipality's population density was 113.2 inhabitants per square kilometre (293/sq mi) and its population had increased by 8.6% over the previous 10-year period.

== General information ==
=== Administrative history ===
The formannskapsdistrikt law of 1837 created a system of local government in Norway by establishing each town (ladested or kjøpstad) and each Church of Norway prestegjeld as a civil municipality. On 1 January 1838, Tjølling prestegjeld was established as Tjølling Municipality. On 1 January 1891, an area of Tjølling Municipality (population: 11) was transferred to the neighboring Hedrum Municipality.

On 1 January 1988, Tjølling Municipality was dissolved and the following areas were merged to form an enlarged Larvik Municipality with a population of people:

- all of Tjølling Municipality (population: 7,878)
- all of Brunlanes Municipality (population: 8,138)
- all of Hedrum Municipality (population: 10,449)
- all of Larvik Municipality (population: 8,045)
- all of Stavern Municipality (population: 2,538)

=== Name ===
The municipality is named after the old Tjølling prestegjeld. The prestegjeld was named after an old name for the area (Old Norse: Þjóðarlyng) since the first Tjølling Church was built there. The first element is the genitive case of the word þjóð which means "crowd of people" or "assembly". This is likely because the site was apparently the location of a Thing for the district long before the introduction of Christianity. The last element is lyng which means "heather".

=== Coat of arms ===
The coat of arms was granted on 7 May 1971. The official blazon is "Azure, two longships argent in pale" (Norwegian: På blå bunn to sølv langskip). This means the arms have a blue field (background) and the charge is a set of two longships, one above the other. The pair of longships has a tincture of argent which means it is commonly colored white, but if it is made out of metal, then silver is used. The two Viking ships in the arms and refer to the long history of the area. The arms were designed by Hallvard Trætteberg. The municipal flag has the same design as the coat of arms.

=== Churches ===
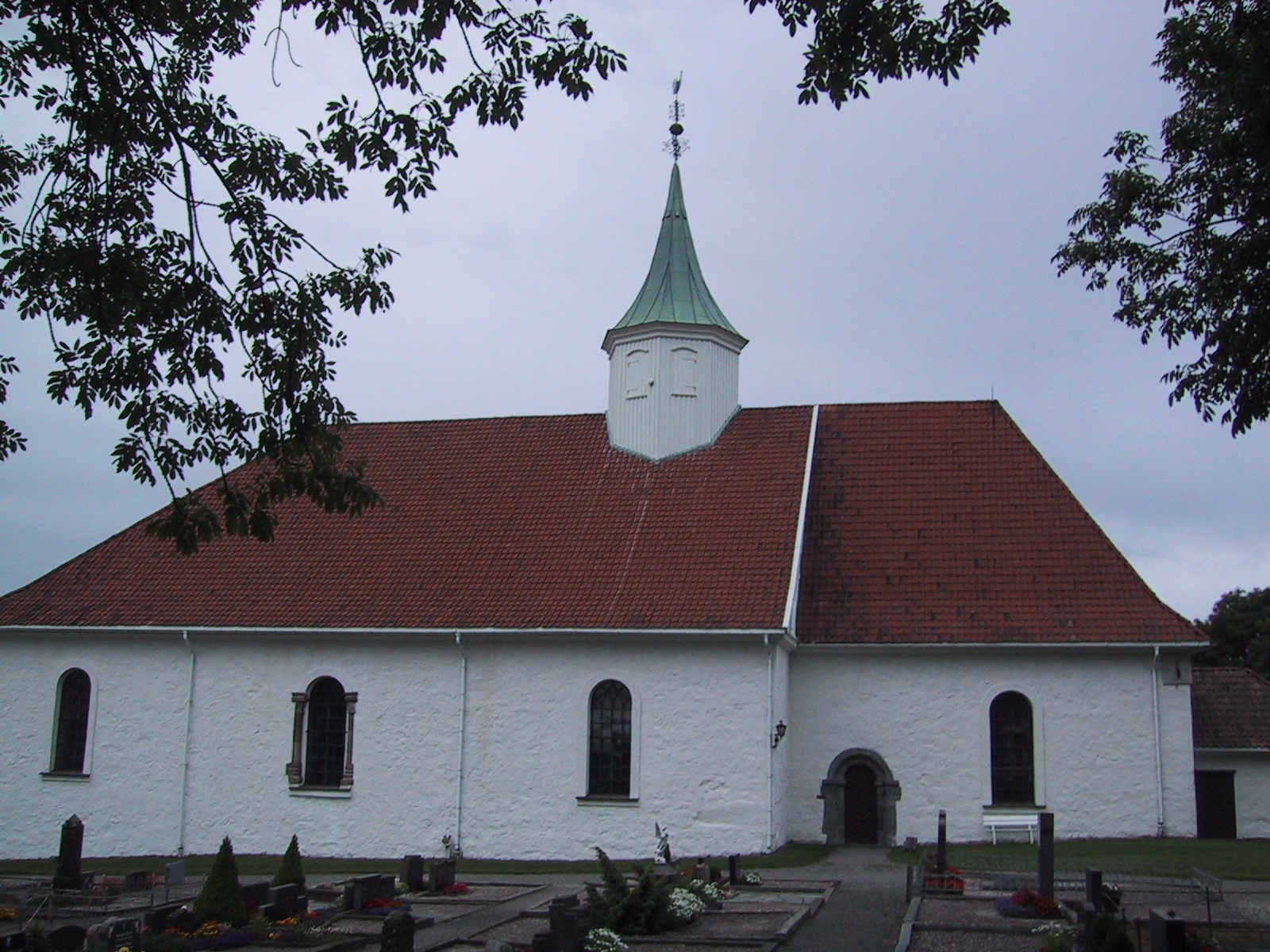
Tjølling Church

The Church of Norway had one parish (sokn) within Tjølling Municipality. At the time of the municipal dissolution, it was part of the Tjølling prestegjeld and the Larvik prosti (deanery) in the Diocese of Tunsberg.

Churches in Tjølling Municipality
Parish (sokn)	Church name	Location of the church	Year built
Tjølling	Tjølling Church	Tjøllingvollen	c. 1100

Tjølling Church (Tjølling kirke) was originally constructed as a medieval stone church in the 12th century. The church was hit by a fire in 1360 and was then rebuilt. An earthquake damaged the church in the 1750s. It has been speculated that it was the 1755 Lisbon earthquake, but it's more plausible that it was an earthquake in Kattegat in 1759 that caused the damages. It was rebuilt from 1762 to 1767 as a Romanesque church with interiors from different eras. The restoration in 1860 gave Tjølling church its present appearance.

== Geography ==
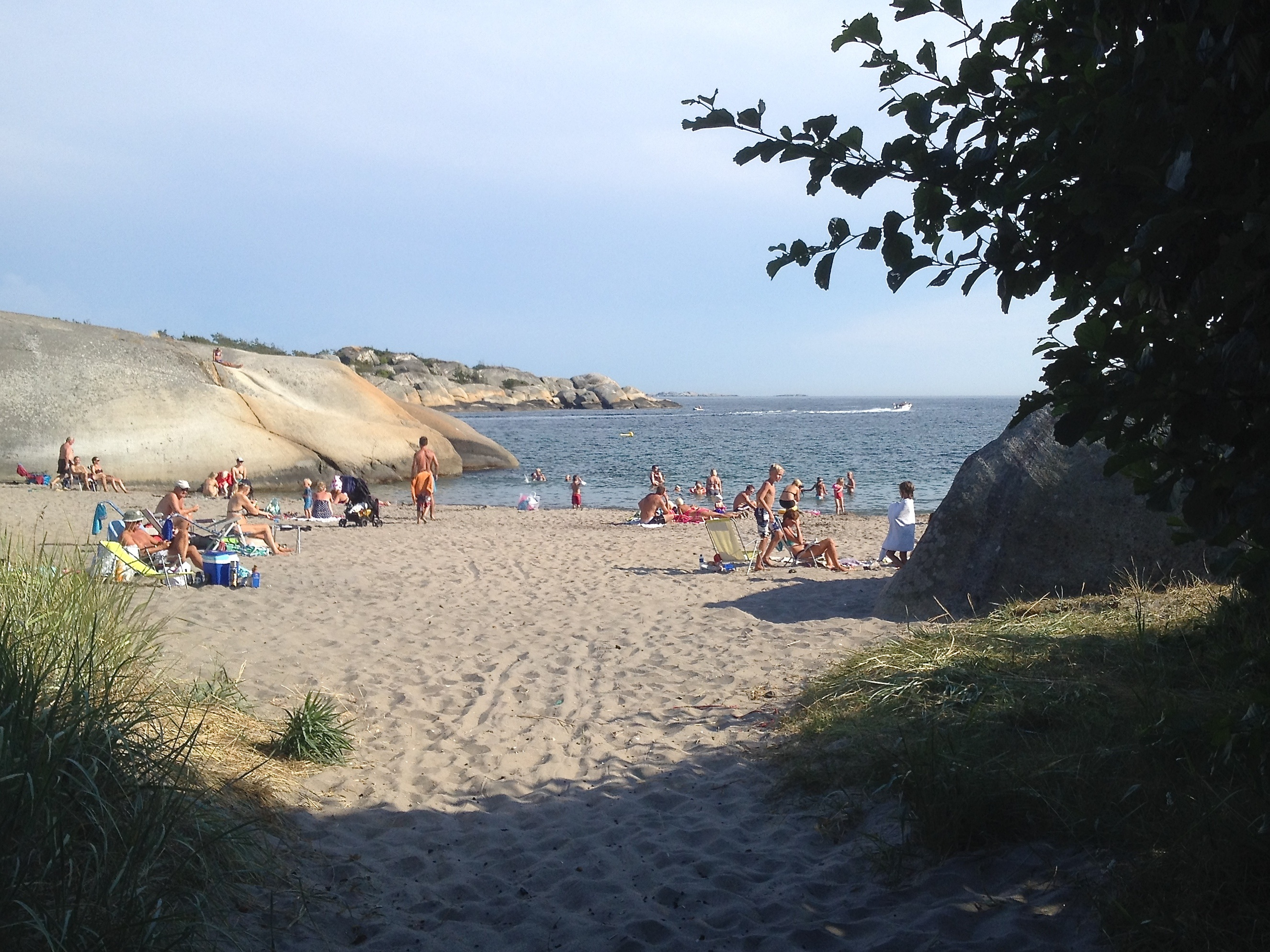
Beach at Ula

Tjølling Municipality included the 69.5 square kilometres (26.8 sq mi) area between the river Numedalslågen and Sandefjordsfjorden, south of the European route E18 highway. The area contained some agriculture and numerous quarries excavating larvikite. The biggest quarry was Klåstad, which extracted type of larvikite called Mørk Labrador (English: Dark Labrador).

Tjølling had a long coastline with many fine beaches and coves. It was also known as a popular holiday cottage area, as well as a popular holiday area. The most popular ports were Ula and Kjerringvik. Viksfjord was an idyllic sidefjord to Larviksfjorden. The highest point in the municipality was the 117-metre (384 ft) tall mountain Kjerringberget.

Sandefjord Municipality was located to the north and east, the Skagerrak was located to the south, Stavern Municipality was located to the southwest, Brunlanes Municipality and Larvik Municipality were located to the west, and Hedrum Municipality was located to the northwest.

== History ==
The area that was Tjølling Municipality was the site of one of the oldest Viking Age settlements within Scandinavia. Kaupang was a big trading centre for the Vikings. Kaupang is considered to be Norway's first city, being mentioned by Ohthere of Hålogaland when he visited Alfred the great around year 890. There have been several earlier archaeological surveys and excavations at Kaupang. In 1867, antiquarian Nicolay Nicolaysen mapped one of the grave-fields around the former town and excavated 79 grave mounds. He uncovered a cremation cemetery, largely dated to the 10th century. Charlotte Blindheim (1917-2005) started excavating in 1947 and completed her last publication in 1999. In 1997, Dagfinn Skre and his associates from the University of Oslo undertook a new program of work at Kaupang followed by a large excavation that ran over three years, from 2000 till 2002. Most recently it has been the site of post-excavation work conducted by the University of Oslo.

Tjøllingvollen (or simply Vollen) is located at the highest part of the outer raet. The village was the administrative centre of Tjølling Municipality. The village is a well developed rural area, with a grocery store, kindergarten, post office, primary and secondary school, health and elderly institutions, among others. During the 1960s and 1970s, the residential area of Vollen was expanded and this has continued into the 21st century.

=== Population ===
Historic numbers show that the municipal population grew from the early 19th century until the municipal merger in 1988.

Historical population
Year	1845	1855	1865	1875	1891	1900	1910	1920	1930	1946	1951	1960	1970	1980	1988
Pop.	2,290	2,509	3,012	3,343	3,620	3,639	3,532	4,035	4,307	4,575	4,911	5,673	6,772	7,412	7,878
±% p.a.	—	+0.92%	+1.84%	+1.05%	+0.50%	+0.06%	−0.30%	+1.34%	+0.65%	+0.38%	+1.43%	+1.62%	+1.79%	+0.91%	+0.77%
Note: On 1 January 1988, Tjølling Municipality became part of Larvik Municipality. Source: Statistics Norway and Norwegian Historical Data Centre

== Government ==
While it existed, Tjølling Municipality was responsible for primary education (through 10th grade), outpatient health services, senior citizen services, welfare and other social services, zoning, economic development, and municipal roads and utilities. The municipality was governed by a municipal council of directly elected representatives. The mayor was indirectly elected by a vote of the municipal council. The municipality was under the jurisdiction of the Larvik District Court and the Agder Court of Appeal.

=== Municipal council ===
The municipal council (Kommunestyre) of Tjølling Municipality was made up of representatives that were elected to four year terms. The tables below show the historical composition of the council by political party.

Tjølling kommunestyre 1983–1987
Party name (in Norwegian)	Number of representatives
Labour Party (Arbeiderpartiet)	12
Progress Party (Fremskrittspartiet)	1
Conservative Party (Høyre)	9
Christian Democratic Party (Kristelig Folkeparti)	2
Centre Party (Senterpartiet)	2
Socialist Left Party (Sosialistisk Venstreparti)	1
Liberal Party (Venstre)	2
Total number of members:	29
Note: On 1 January 1988, Tjølling Municipality became part of Larvik Municipality.

Tjølling kommunestyre 1979–1983
Party name (in Norwegian)	Number of representatives
Labour Party (Arbeiderpartiet)	11
Conservative Party (Høyre)	9
Christian Democratic Party (Kristelig Folkeparti)	2
Centre Party (Senterpartiet)	3
Socialist Left Party (Sosialistisk Venstreparti)	1
Liberal Party (Venstre)	3
Total number of members:	25

Tjølling kommunestyre 1975–1979
Party name (in Norwegian)	Number of representatives
Labour Party (Arbeiderpartiet)	13
Conservative Party (Høyre)	5
Christian Democratic Party (Kristelig Folkeparti)	3
Centre Party (Senterpartiet)	5
Socialist Left Party (Sosialistisk Venstreparti)	1
Liberal Party (Venstre)	2
Total number of members:	29

Tjølling kommunestyre 1971–1975
Party name (in Norwegian)	Number of representatives
Labour Party (Arbeiderpartiet)	14
Conservative Party (Høyre)	5
Christian Democratic Party (Kristelig Folkeparti)	2
Centre Party (Senterpartiet)	5
Liberal Party (Venstre)	3
Total number of members:	29

Tjølling kommunestyre 1967–1971
Party name (in Norwegian)	Number of representatives
Labour Party (Arbeiderpartiet)	14
Conservative Party (Høyre)	4
Christian Democratic Party (Kristelig Folkeparti)	1
Centre Party (Senterpartiet)	4
Socialist People's Party (Sosialistisk Folkeparti)	1
Liberal Party (Venstre)	5
Total number of members:	29

Tjølling kommunestyre 1963–1967
Party name (in Norwegian)	Number of representatives
Labour Party (Arbeiderpartiet)	16
Conservative Party (Høyre)	4
Christian Democratic Party (Kristelig Folkeparti)	1
Centre Party (Senterpartiet)	4
Liberal Party (Venstre)	4
Total number of members:	29

Tjølling herredsstyre 1959–1963
Party name (in Norwegian)	Number of representatives
Labour Party (Arbeiderpartiet)	14
Conservative Party (Høyre)	3
Communist Party (Kommunistiske Parti)	1
Christian Democratic Party (Kristelig Folkeparti)	1
Centre Party (Senterpartiet)	4
Liberal Party (Venstre)	6
Total number of members:	29

Tjølling herredsstyre 1955–1959
Party name (in Norwegian)	Number of representatives
Labour Party (Arbeiderpartiet)	14
Conservative Party (Høyre)	3
Communist Party (Kommunistiske Parti)	1
Christian Democratic Party (Kristelig Folkeparti)	2
Farmers' Party (Bondepartiet)	4
Liberal Party (Venstre)	5
Total number of members:	29

Tjølling herredsstyre 1951–1955
Party name (in Norwegian)	Number of representatives
Labour Party (Arbeiderpartiet)	14
Conservative Party (Høyre)	3
Communist Party (Kommunistiske Parti)	1
Christian Democratic Party (Kristelig Folkeparti)	2
Farmers' Party (Bondepartiet)	3
Liberal Party (Venstre)	5
Total number of members:	28

Tjølling herredsstyre 1947–1951
Party name (in Norwegian)	Number of representatives
Labour Party (Arbeiderpartiet)	11
Conservative Party (Høyre)	3
Communist Party (Kommunistiske Parti)	2
Christian Democratic Party (Kristelig Folkeparti)	1
Farmers' Party (Bondepartiet)	4
Joint list of the Liberal Party (Venstre) and the Radical People's Party (Radikale Folkepartiet)	7
Total number of members:	28

Tjølling herredsstyre 1945–1947
Party name (in Norwegian)	Number of representatives
Labour Party (Arbeiderpartiet)	11
Conservative Party (Høyre)	2
Communist Party (Kommunistiske Parti)	3
Christian Democratic Party (Kristelig Folkeparti)	2
Farmers' Party (Bondepartiet)	4
Joint list of the Liberal Party (Venstre) and the Radical People's Party (Radikale Folkepartiet)	6
Total number of members:	28

Tjølling herredsstyre 1937–1941*
Party name (in Norwegian)	Number of representatives
Labour Party (Arbeiderpartiet)	12
Farmers' Party (Bondepartiet)	3
Liberal Party (Venstre)	8
Joint list of the Conservative Party (Høyre) and the Free-minded People's Party (Frisinnede Folkeparti)	5
Total number of members:	28
Note: Due to the German occupation of Norway during World War II, no elections were held for new municipal councils until after the war ended in 1945.

=== Mayors ===
The mayor (Norwegian: ordfører) of Tjølling Municipality was the political leader of the municipality and the chairperson of the municipal council. The following people have held this position:

- 1838–1849: Johan Nilsen Bugge
- 1850–1871: Magnus Hesselberg
- 1872–1875: Hans Christian Jahnsen
- 1876–1881: Magnus Gotthilf Oppen
- 1882–1885: Olaus Hansen Vig
- 1886–1887: Martin Jansen Huseby
- 1888–1889: Magnus Gothilf Oppen
- 1890–1899: Hans Peter Martinsen
- 1899–1907: Hans Oluf Olsen Gjerstad (V)
- 1907–1910: Nils Magnus Nilsen Tvedten (V)
- 1911–1922: Ole L. Hem (LL)
- 1923–1928: Johannes Grønneberg (H)
- 1929–1931: Martin N. Østby (Ap)
- 1932–1937: Johannes Grønneberg (H)
- 1938–1938: Nils Magnus Nilsen Tvedten (V)
- 1938–1945: Johannes Grønneberg (H/NS)
- 1945–1945: Mathias Bredvei (Bp)
- 1945–1945: Johannes Bredvei (V)
- 1946–1947: Jørgen Jørgensen (Ap)
- 1948–1951: Olaf Lund (V)
- 1952–1955: Jørgen Jørgensen (Ap)
- 1956–1971: Hans Huseby Hem (Ap)
- 1972–1975: Borger Huseby (Sp)
- 1976–1979: Hans Tvedten (Sp)
- 1980–1987: Arild Lund (H)

== Education and sports ==
Tjodalyng school was a primary and secondary school for the municipality, with around 520 students and 60 employees. The school was built as a primary school in 1963, and was expanded as a secondary school in 1976.

Tjølling IF was founded in 1888 and was the main sports club for the municipality. It was located at Løveskogen Idrettspark and at Tjøllinghallen. The club also has artificial turf pitches, a grass pitch, two peach pitches, and a clubhouse. The club has 27 association football teams, where nine of those are women's teams, and 18 are men's teams. They also have 18 children's teams, six youth teams, three adult teams, and 23 coaches. The sports association has other activities as well, like "allis" for kids between 2–7 years old, and activities for former members. There's also Tjøllingmila and Vestfold Maraton, which they arrange.

== See also ==
- List of former municipalities of Norway
