= Tjølling Church =

Church in Vestfold, Norway

- Tjølling kirke
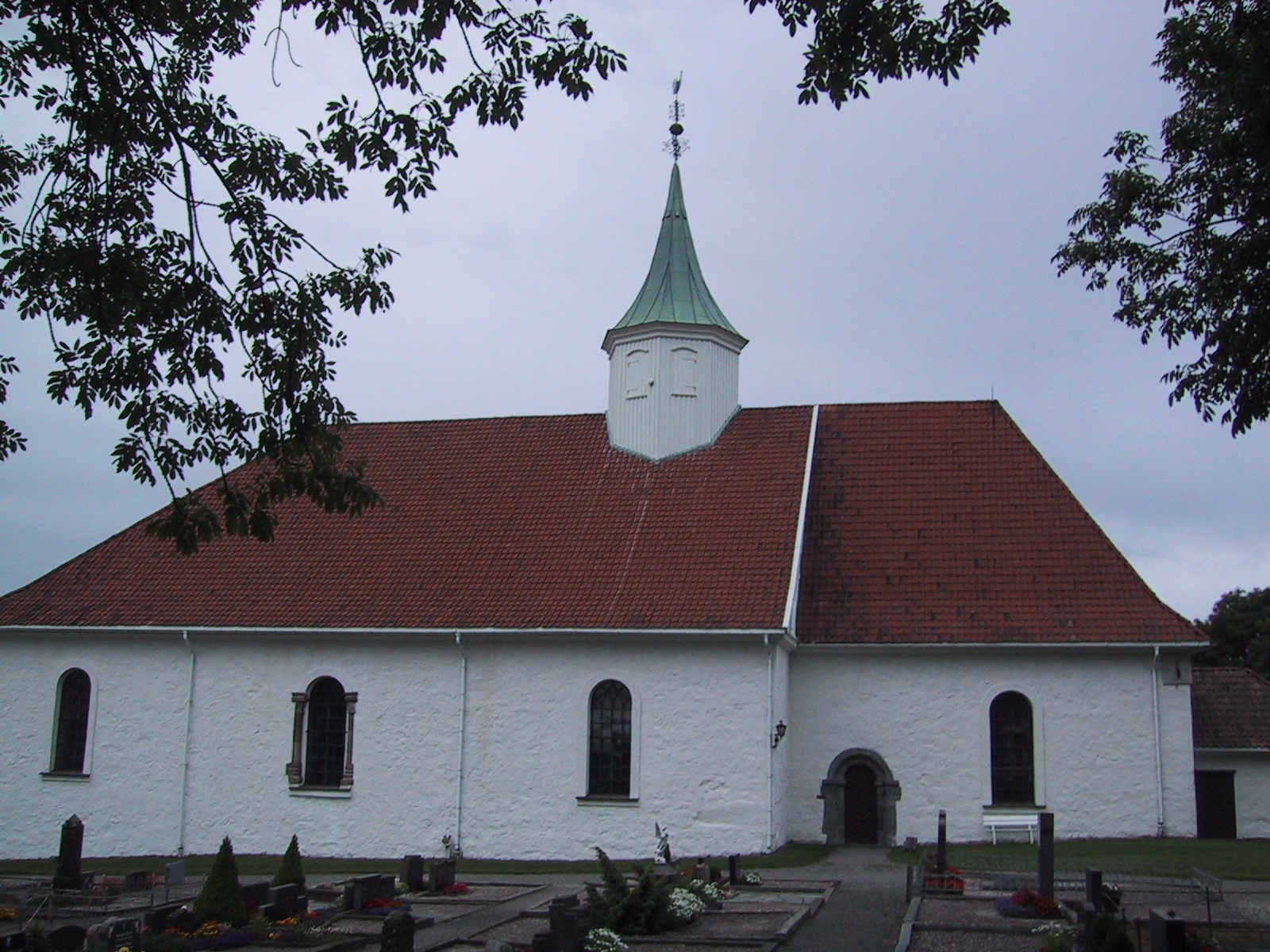
- View of the church
- Tjølling Church
- 59°03′24″N 10°07′32″E
- Location: Larvik Municipality, Vestfold
- Country: Norway
- Denomination: Church of Norway
- Previous denomination: Catholic Church
- Churchmanship: Evangelical Lutheran

History
- Status: Parish church
- Founded: c. 1150
- Consecrated: c. 1150

Architecture
- Functional status: Active
- Architectural type: Long church
- Completed: c. 1150 (876 years ago)

Specifications
- Capacity: 500
- Materials: Stone

Administration
- Diocese: Tunsberg
- Deanery: Larvik prosti
- Parish: Tjølling
- Norwegian Cultural Heritage Site
- Type: Church
- Status: Automatically protected
- ID: 85637

Tjølling Church (Norwegian: Tjølling kirke) is a parish church of the Church of Norway in Larvik Municipality in Vestfold county, Norway. It is located in the village of Tjøllingvollen. It is the church for the Tjølling parish which is part of the Larvik prosti (deanery) in the Diocese of Tunsberg. The white, stone church was built in a long church design around the year 1150 using plans drawn up by an unknown architect. The church seats about 500 people.

== History ==
The earliest existing historical records of the church date back to the year 1364 when the rectory burned down, but the church was not built that year. The church was likely built in the early 12th century under orders by King Sigurd Jorsalfare. The building originally had a Romanesque design. During the 13th-century, it was remodelled to more of a Gothic design. After the Black Death in Norway, the conditions of the church went downhill. During the 15th century, there was a significant fire that nearly destroyed the church. The church is said to have been in bad shape for a long time afterwards. In 1759, an earthquake damaged the building and then again in 1760-1761 it was damaged by storms. In 1762–1764, the church was thoroughly rebuilt by a couple of German builders. Many of the walls were demolished and rebuilt, so that the weight of the roof structure would be carried by the walls instead of by interior columns. The roof was also rebuilt with its current characteristic hipped roof. The old tower from 1698 was reinstalled on the new roof.

In 1814, this church served as an election church (Norwegian: valgkirke). Together with more than 300 other parish churches across Norway, it was a polling station for elections to the 1814 Norwegian Constituent Assembly which wrote the Constitution of Norway. This was Norway's first national elections. Each church parish was a constituency that elected people called "electors" who later met together in each county to elect the representatives for the assembly that was to meet at Eidsvoll Manor later that year.

Lightning had struck the old church tower in 1783, 1800, and again in 1833, causing fire damage each time. In 1842, a new tower and spire was built on the centre part of the roof to replace the old, damaged tower. In 1864, the south portal entrance was bricked up and a window was inserted instead.

== Media gallery ==
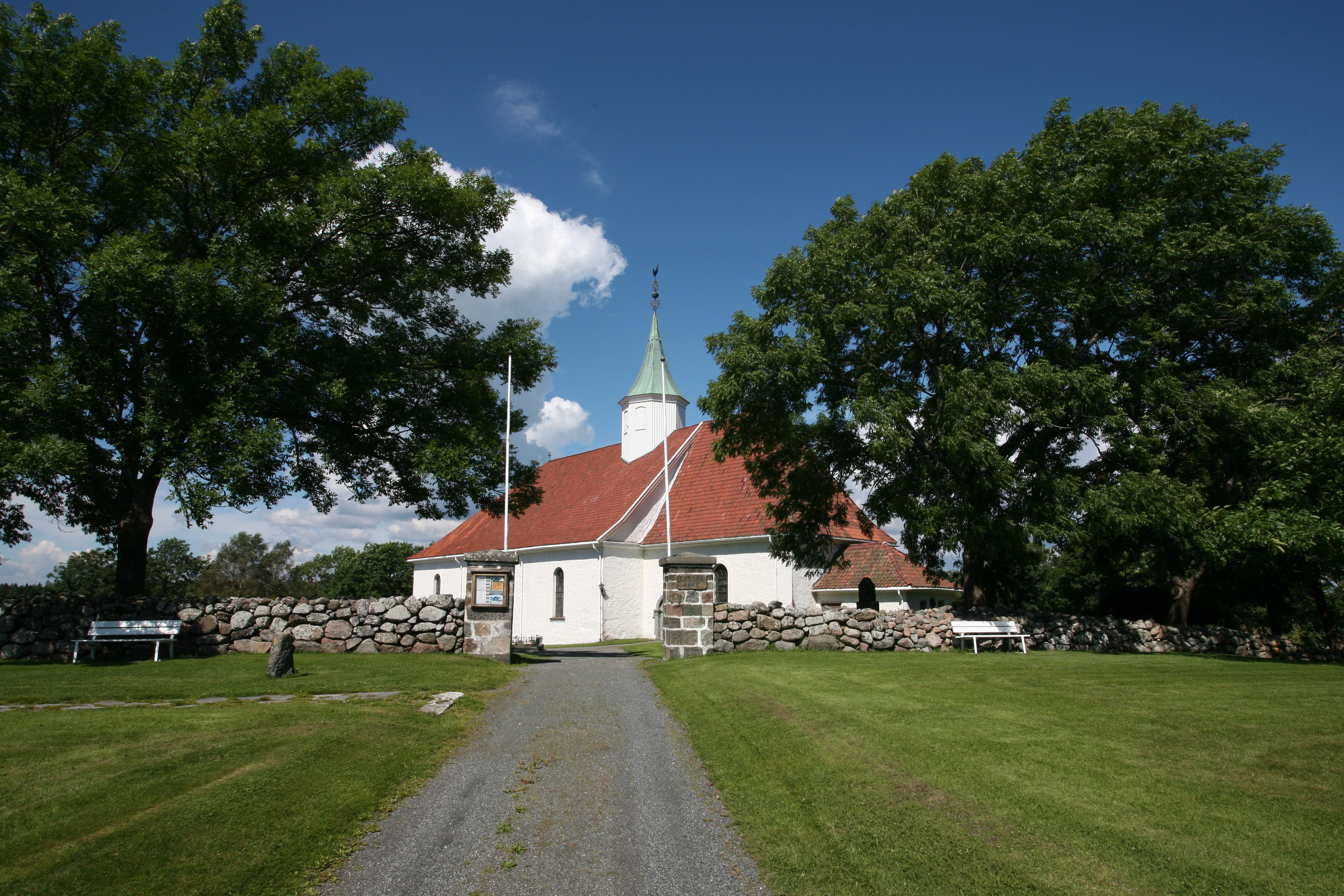

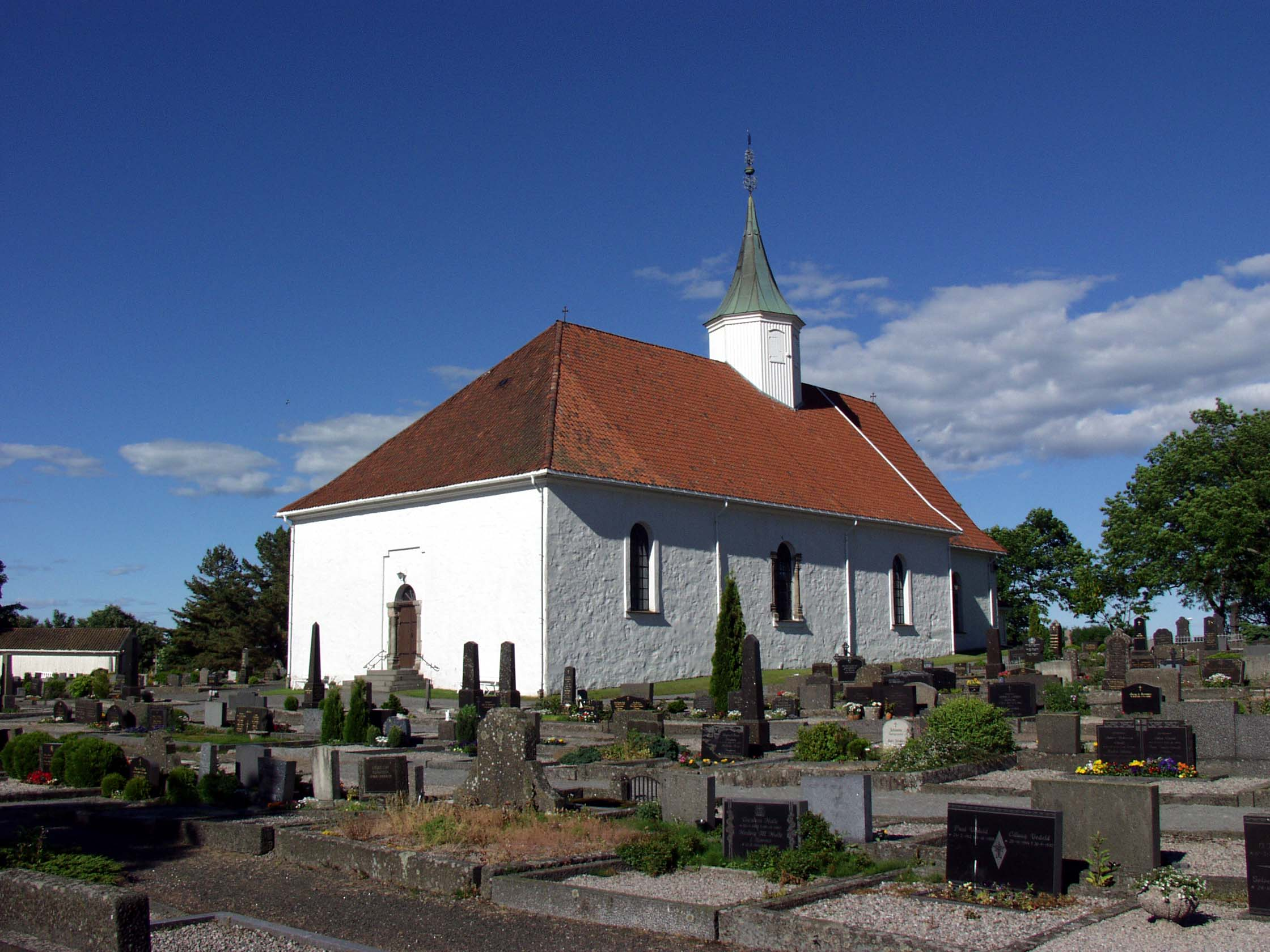

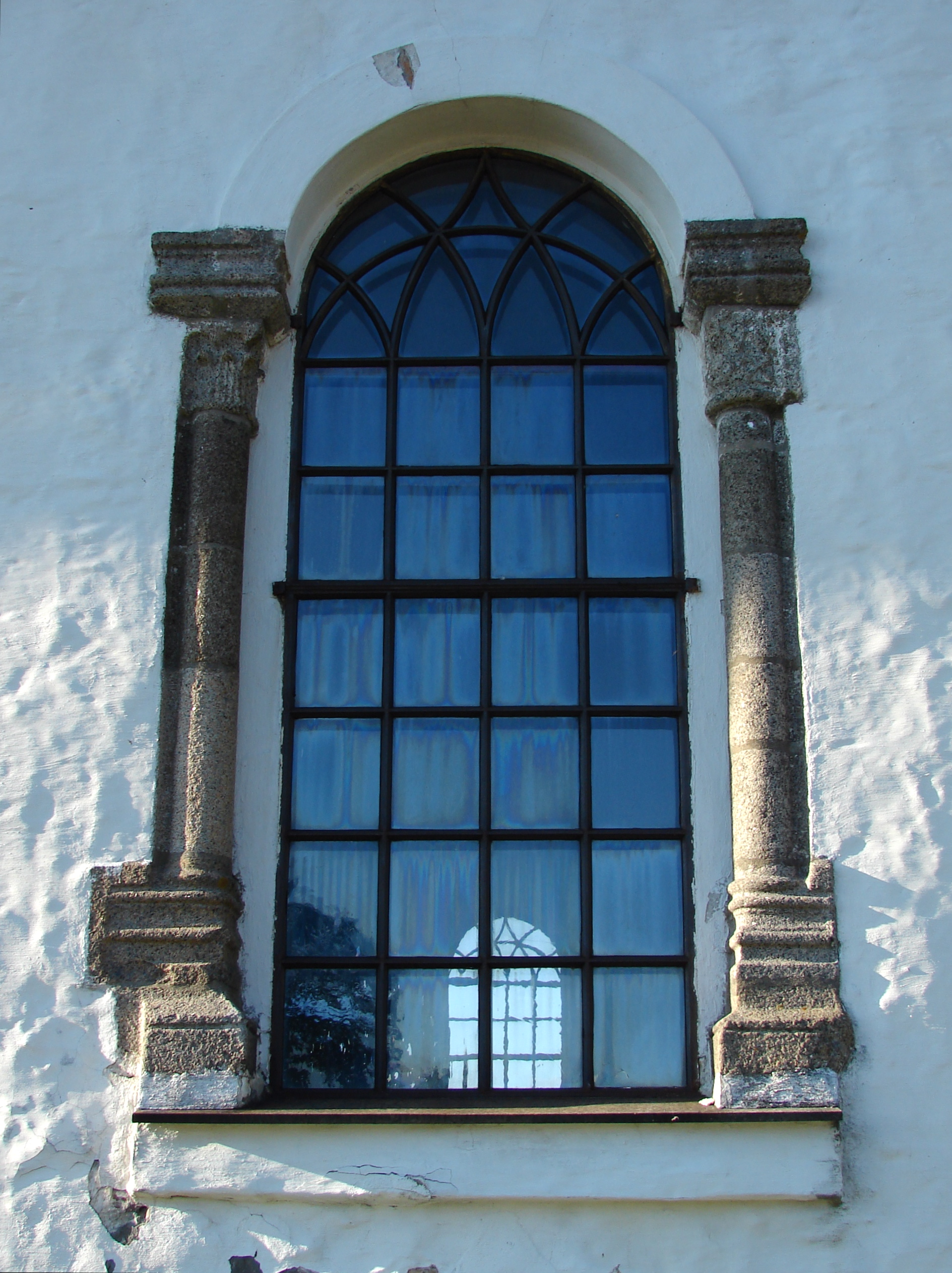

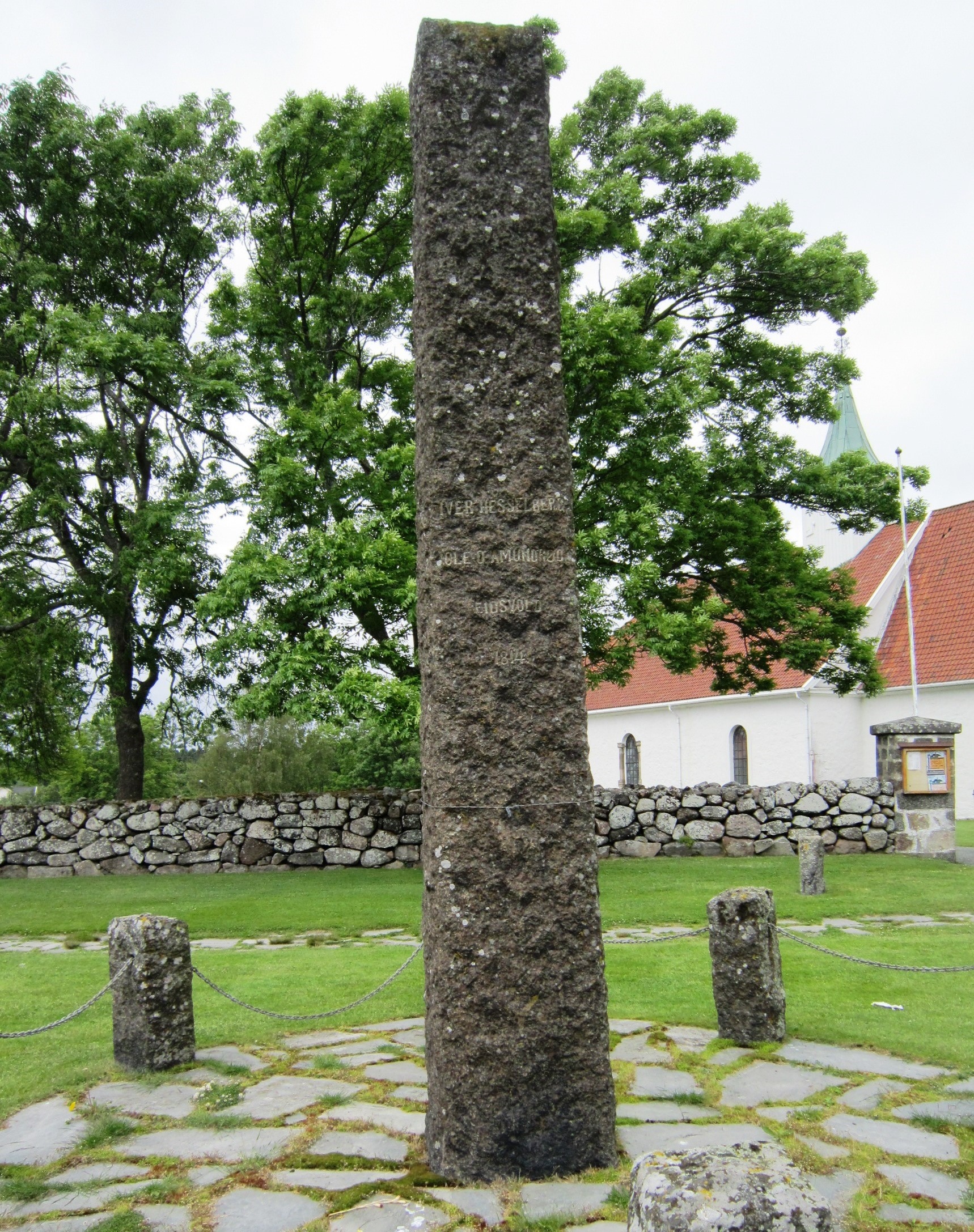

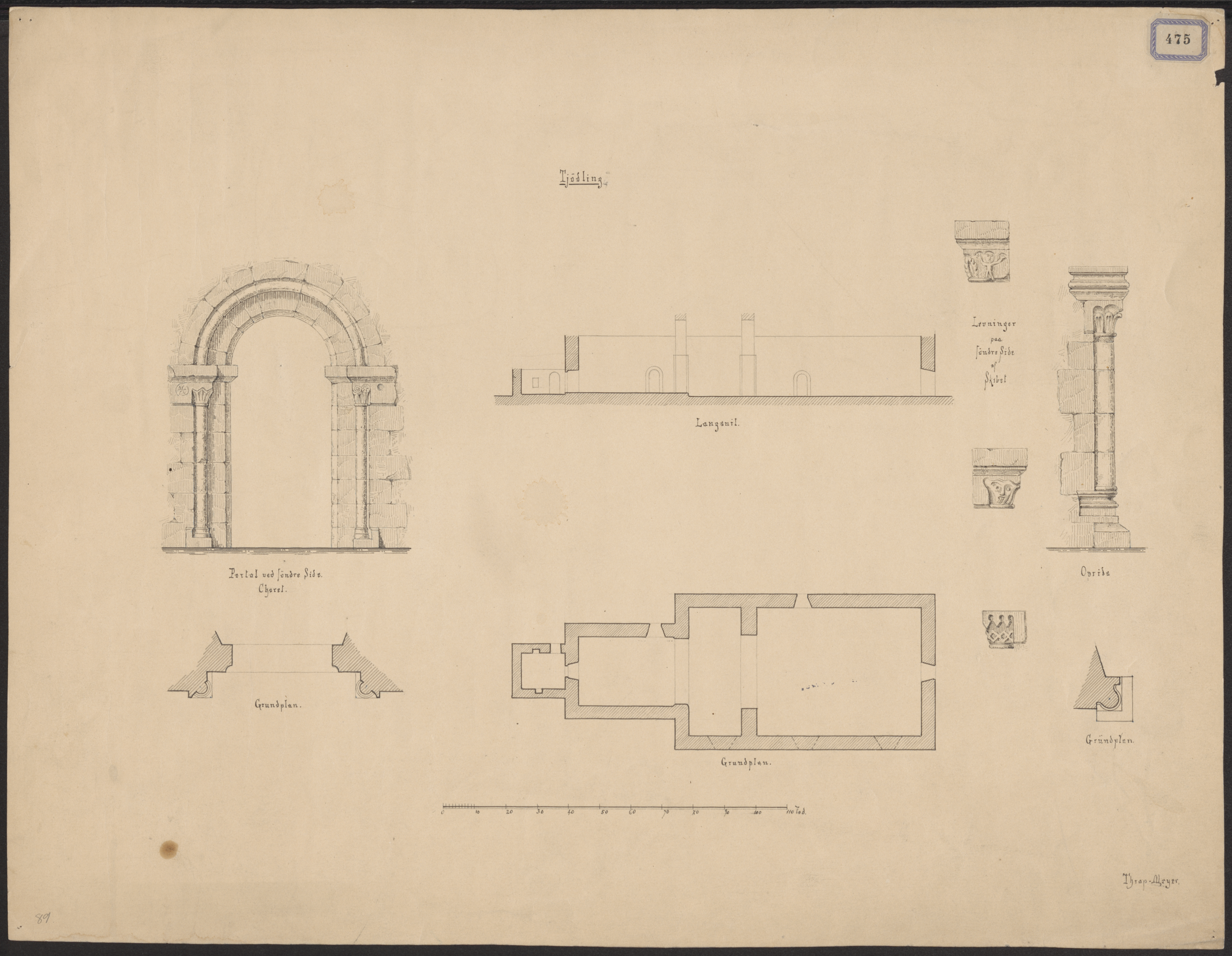

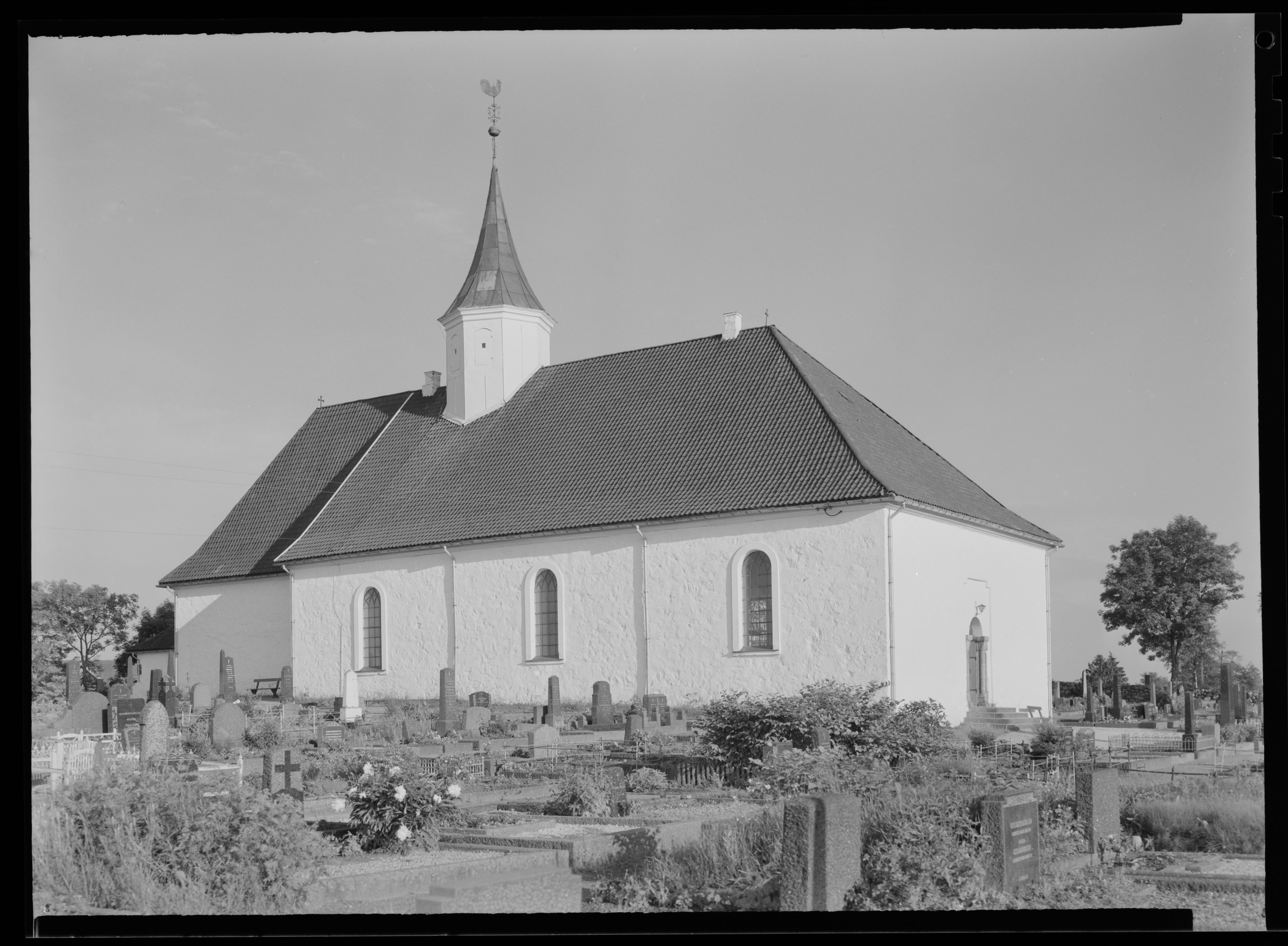

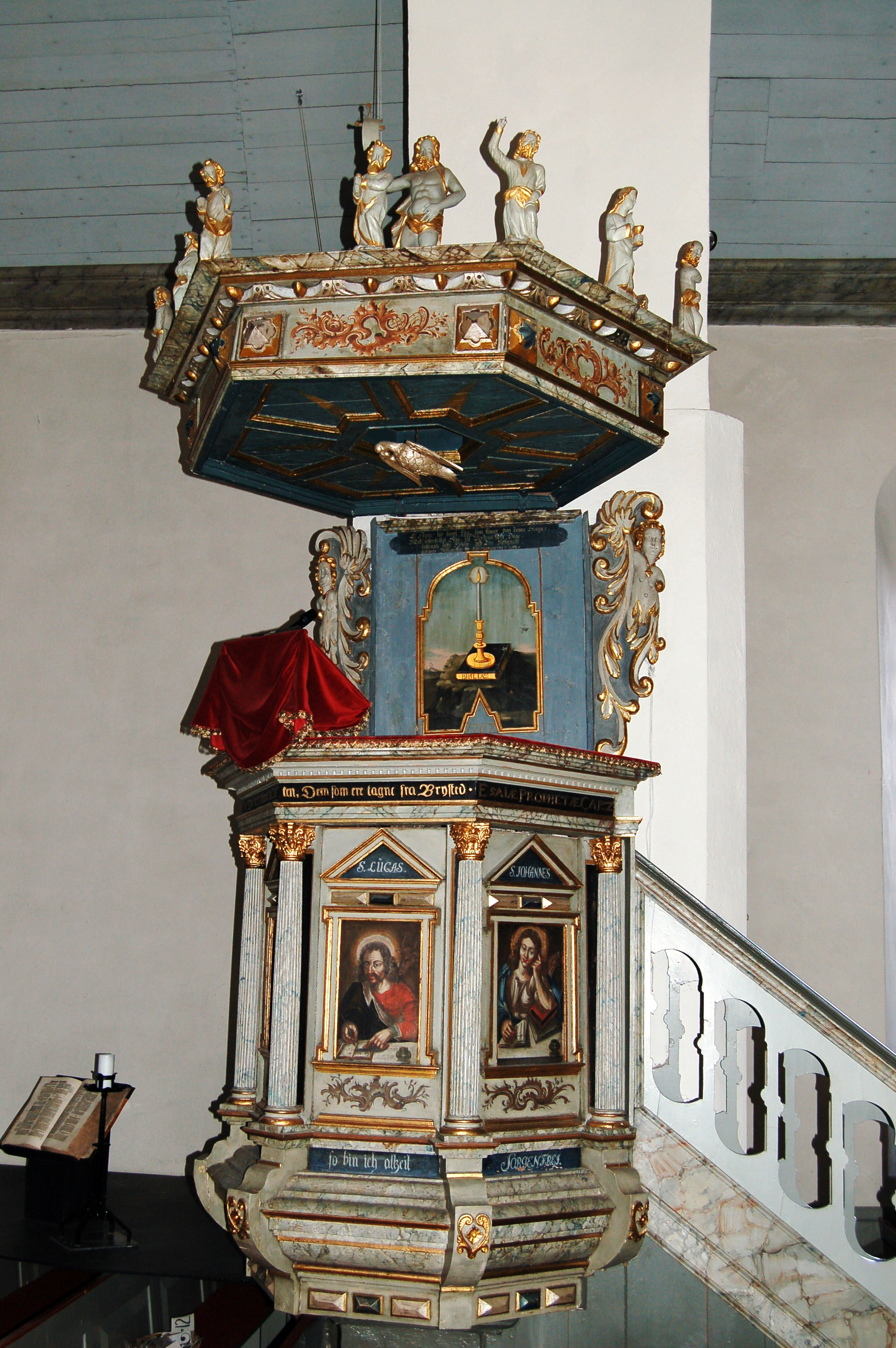

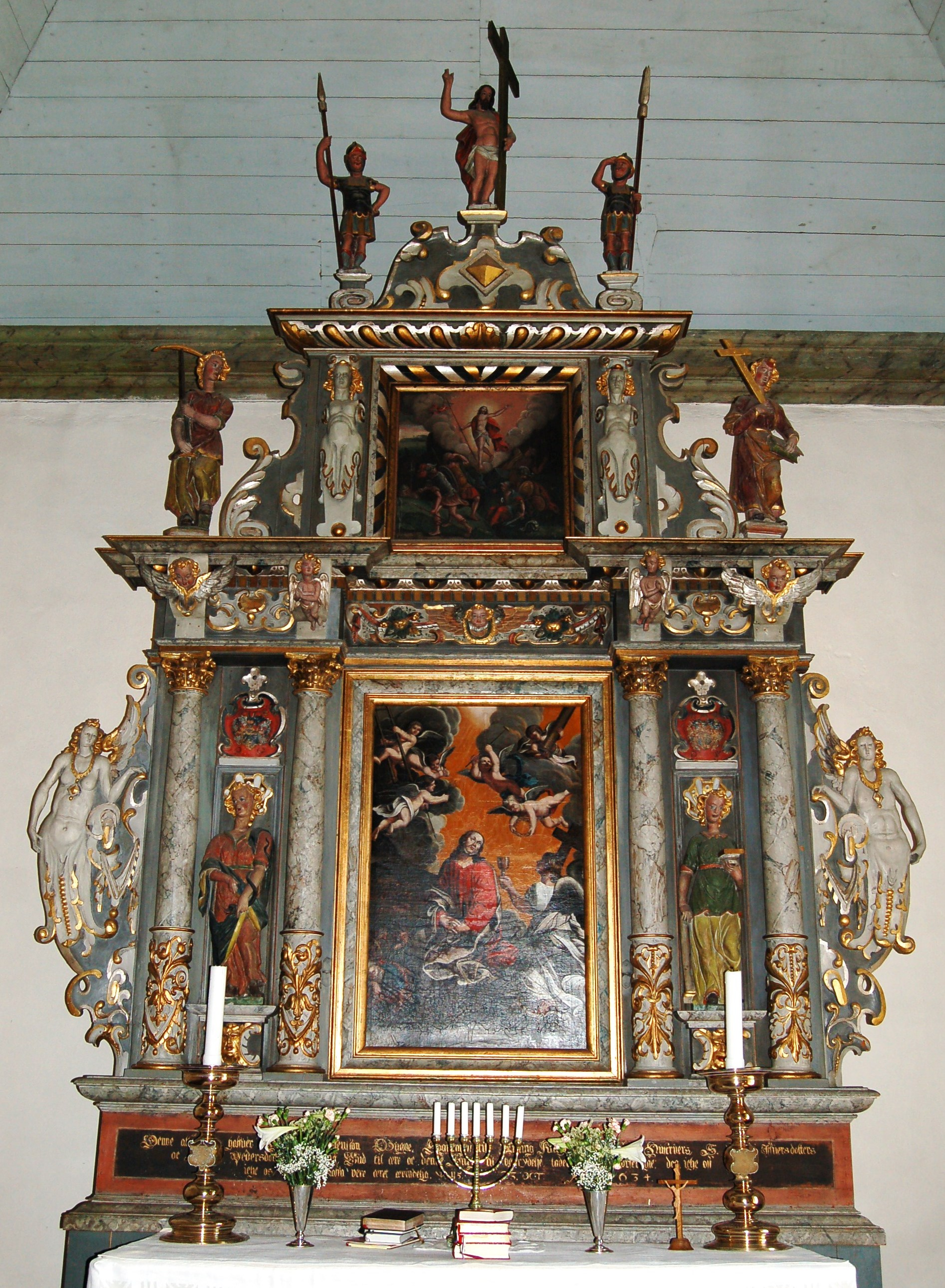

== See also ==
- List of churches in Tunsberg
