= Janet Bately =

British academic

- Occupation: Academic

Academic background
- Education: Somerville College, Oxford

Academic work
- Discipline: Old English literature, Middle English literature
- Institutions: King's College London

Janet Bately CBE FBA FRSA FKC is a British academic, the Sir Israel Gollancz Professor Emerita of English Language and Medieval Literature at King's College London since 1977. She has a bachelor's degree from Somerville College, Oxford and began her academic career as a lecturer at Birkbeck College. Her research interests include Old English and Middle English literatures, the court of King Alfred the Great, and early modern bilingual dictionaries.

== Recognition ==
Bately was elected Fellow of the British Academy in 1990, and a CBE in 2000. She is an Honorary Fellow of Somerville College, Oxford. In 1997, Bately was honoured with a Festschrift, Alfred the Wise, edited by Jane Roberts, Janet L. Nelson, and Malcolm Godden to celebrate her 65th birthday.

== Selected works ==
- Bately, Janet M. "Old English Prose before and during the Reign of Alfred." Anglo-Saxon England 17 (1988): 93-138.
- Bately, Janet. "Did King Alfred actually translate anything? The integrity of the Alfredian canon revisited." Medium Ævum 78.2 (2009): 189-215.
- Bately, Janet M. The Literary Prose of King Alfred's Reign: Translation or Transformation?. Routledge, 2019.
- Bately, Janet M. "The Old English Orosius." A Companion to Alfred the Great. Brill, 2015. 297-343.
- Bately, Janet. "BILINGUAL AND MULTILINGUAL DICTIONARIES OF THE RENAISSANCE AND EARLY SEVENTEENTH CENTURY1." The Oxford history of English lexicography 1 (2008): 41-64.
