= Tjøllingvollen =

Village in Larvik, Norway

Tjøllingvollen Viksfjord
- Village
- Interactive map of Tjøllingvollen
- Coordinates: 59.05576°N 10.12697°E
- Country: Norway
- Region: Eastern Norway
- County: Vestfold
- Municipality: Larvik Municipality
- Elevation: 40 m (130 ft)
- Time zone: UTC+01:00 (CET)
  - Summer (DST): UTC+02:00 (CEST)
- Post Code: 3280 Tjodalyng

Tjøllingvollen is a village in Larvik Municipality in Vestfold county, Norway. The village is located about 5 kilometres (3.1 mi) to the east of the town of Larvik. The village of Hem lies about 5 kilometres (3.1 mi) to the northeast, the village of Verningen lies about 5 kilometres (3.1 mi) to the north, and the coastal village of Ula lies about 5 kilometres (3.1 mi) to the southeast.

Tjølling Church is located in the north part of the village. The Vestfoldbanen railway line historically stopped at the Viksfjord Station on the south side of the village, but the station closed in 1978 (which is why the area is sometimes called Viksfjord).

== History ==
The village was the administrative centre of the old Tjølling Municipality which existed from 1838 until 1988 when it became part of Larvik Municipality.
