= Oscar Albert Johnsen =

Norwegian historian (1876–1954)

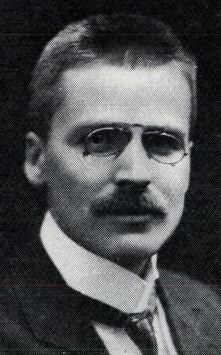
- Born: October 13, 1876; Tjøme, Norway
- Died: October 11, 1954 (aged 77); Oslo, Norway
- Occupation: Historian
- Children: Arne Odd Johnsen

Oscar Albert Johnsen (October 13, 1876 – October 11, 1954) was a Norwegian historian. He published a number of books on historical topics.

== Life ==
Johnsen became a student a 1896; he graduated with a master's degree in 1898, and in 1906 he received a PhD with his dissertation De norske stænder (The Norwegian Estates). In 1906 and 1907 he studied as a government scholar in Copenhagen, Paris, and Berlin. Later, he made a number of study trips abroad, including to England, Germany, and the Baltic countries. He was professor of history at the University of Oslo from 1913 to 1945.

Johnsen and Halvdan Koht influenced Norwegian historiography in the 1900s through their views that there was no constitutional equality between Denmark and Norway after the introduction of the absolute monarchy in AD 1660.

Together with the teachers Lorens Berg from Andebu Municipality and Jacob Aaland from Nordfjord, as well as Edvard Bull Sr., Johnsen was central to the new local historical movement that arose after the dissolution of the union. This led to the establishment of the National Society for Rural and Urban History (Landslaget for bygde- og byhistorie) in 1920, where Johnsen served as chairman from its beginning until 1945. Johnsen, Berg, and Aaland worked closely together and set the standard for the modern local history book (bygdebok). They orientated themselves beyond the discipline of history and studied life in a small community based on source-critical studies in local and national archives.

During the Second World War, the nationally conservative Johnsen was head of the newly created Institute for Medieval Texts (Institutt for middelaldertekster). The institute did not receive any special support from the Germans, but the Nasjonal Samling party was very interested in it. Johnsen was accused of cooperating too strongly with the Nazi ministry.

Johnsen was the editor of the journal Heimen from 1922 to 1945 and the editor of the local history yearbook Vestfoldminne from 1924 to 1932. He was a recipient of the Swedish Order of the Polar Star.

In 1901 Johnson married Anna Evie Tollefsen (1877–1944), the daughter of Even Tollefsen, the inventor of the tanker. They had four children, the youngest of whom was the historian Arne Odd Johnsen.

== Bibliography ==
=== Books ===
- Hurum herred – en historisk-topografisk beskrivelse (Hurum County: A Historical-Topographic Description, 1903)
- Bohuslens eiendomsforhold – indtil omkring freden i Roskilde (Bohuslän's Property Conditions: Until Around the Treaty of Roskilde, 1905)
- De norske stænder. Bidrag til oplysning om folkets deltagelse i statsanliggender fra reformationen til enevældet (1537–1661) (The Norwegian Estates. A Contribution to Information on Popular Participation in State Affairs from the Reformation to the Monarchy (1537–1661), 1906)
- Lærebok i Norges, Danmarks og Sveriges historie for gymnasiene (Textbook on the History of Norway, Denmark, and Sweden for High Schools, 1909)
- Hannibal Sehesteds statholderskab 1642-1651 – et tidsskifte i Norges historie (Hannibal Sehested's Governorship, 1642–1651: A Time of Change in the History of Norway, 1909)
- Soga um Norig, Sverike og Danmark (The Story of Norway, Sweden and Denmark, 1916)
- Norges bønder – utsyn over den norske bondestands historie (Farmers in Norway: Overview of the History of the Norwegian Peasantry, 1919)
- Larviks historie (History of Larvik, 1923–1963)
- Finmarkens politiske historie (Political History of Finnmark, 1923)
- Noregsveldets undergang (The Downfall of the Kingdom of Norway, c. 1924)
- Tønsbergs historie (History of Tønsberg, 1929–1954)
- Rapports de la Légation de France a Copenhague – Relatifs a la Norvége 1670–1791, Tome 1, 1670–1748 (Reports of the French Legation in Copenhagen: Relating to Norway 1670–1791, Volume 1, 1670–1748, 1934)
- Innføring i kildene til Norges historie inntil det 19. århundre (Introduction to Sources of Norway's History until the 19th Century, 1939)
- Norwegische Wirtschaftsgeschichte (Norwegian Economic History, 1939)
- Norges brannkasse 1767-1942 (The Norwegian Mutual Fire Insurance Company 1767–1942, 1942–1956)
- Sem og Slagen – en bygdebok (Sem and Slagen: A Local History, 1945–1948)
- Tønsbergs sparebank gjennem hundre år – 1847–1947 (One Hundred Years of the Tønsberg Savings Bank: 1847–1947, 1951)

=== Articles ===
- "Bidrag til Oplysning om Befolkningsforholdene og Almuens økonomiske Stilling i Bohuslen før Afstaaelsen (1528–1658)" (Information on Population Conditions and the Financial Situation of the Peasants in Bohuslän before the Territorial Cession, 1528–1658) Historisk tidsskrift 1905 18: 187–247
- "Et aktstykke fra stænderforhandlingerne i Kristiania 1645" (A Legal Document from the Estates Negotiations in Kristiania, 1645) Historisk tidsskrift 1907 19: 81–97
- "Raad mod Borgerskab. Kristiania-Interiør fra Midten af det 17de Aarhundre" (Advice against the Middle Class. Kristiania Decor from the Mid-Seventeenth Century) Historisk tidsskrift 1909 20: 532–559
- "Om det norske folks opfatning av tronfølgen før 1660" (The Norwegian People's Perception of Royal Succession before 1660) Historisk tidsskrift 1914 23: 190–221
- "Snorre Sturlasons opfatning av vor ældre historie" (Snorri Sturluson's View of Our Early History) Historisk tidsskrift 1916 24: 213–232
- "Fridgerdar-saga. En kildekritisk undersøkelse" (Friðgerðarsaga. A Source-Critical Study) Historisk tidsskrift 1916 24: 513–539
- "Sarpsborgs gamle kirker" (Sarpsborg's Old Churches) Historisk tidsskrift 1916 24: 540–545
- "Om haandskriftene til den store Olav den helliges saga" (The Manuscripts of the Separate Saga of St. Olaf) Historisk tidsskrift 1920 25: 382–401
- "Gjensidige nationale stemninger hos nordmænd og svensker, særlig i det 16. og 17. aarhundred" (Mutual National Feelings of the Norwegians and Swedes, Especially in the Sixteenth and Seventeenth Centuries) Historisk tidsskrift 1924 26: 233–261
- "Gildevæsenet i Norge i middelalderen. Oprindelse og utvikling" (The Nature of the Guild in Medieval Norway. Origin and Development) Historisk tidsskrift 1924 26: 73–101
- "Nordiske handelsforbindelser med Frankrike før 1814" (Nordic Trade Relations with France before 1814) Historisk tidsskrift 1927–29 28: 268–298
- "Kilder i utenlandske samlinger til norsk handels- og sjøfartshistorie i nyere tid (16.-18. århundre)" (Sources in Foreign Collections on Early Modern Norwegian Commercial and Maritime History: Sixteenth–Eighteenth Centuries) Historisk tidsskrift 1927–29 28: 491–505
- "Norges handel på Spania under Kristian IV" (Norway's Trade with Spain under Christian IV) Historisk tidsskrift 1930–33 29: 225–240
- "Nederland og Norge 1625-1650. Gjensvar til dr. Johan Schreiner" (The Netherlands and Norway 1625–1650. A Response to Dr. Johan Schreiner) Historisk tidsskrift 1934–36 30: 479–487
- "Ernst Sars. Opposisjonsinnlegg ved Trygve Ræders doktordisputas" (Ernst Sars. Statement at Trygve Ræder's Doctoral Dissertation Defense) Historisk tidsskrift 1937–40 31: 50–63
- "Norwegische Wirtschaftsgeschichte. Svar til professor S. Hasund" (Norwegian Economic History. A Reply to Professor S. Hasund) Historisk tidsskrift 1940–42 32: 279–283
