= Lorens =

Lorens is a Scandinavian given name. Notable people with the name include:

- Lorens Berg, Norwegian teacher and local historian
  - Lorens Berg Foundation
- Lorens Marmstedt (1908–1966), Swedish film producer
- Lorens Pasch the Elder, Swedish portrait painter
- Lorens Pasch the Younger, Swedish painter
- Lorens von der Linde, Swedish field marshal
- Nils Lorens Sjöberg, Swedish officer and poet

== See also ==
- Lorenz
- Loren (name)
- Edward Lorens, Polish football manager and player
- Iva Lorens, Serbian record producer and singer-songwriter
