= Sogn og Fjordane Art Museum =

- Sogn og Fjordane Kunstmuseum
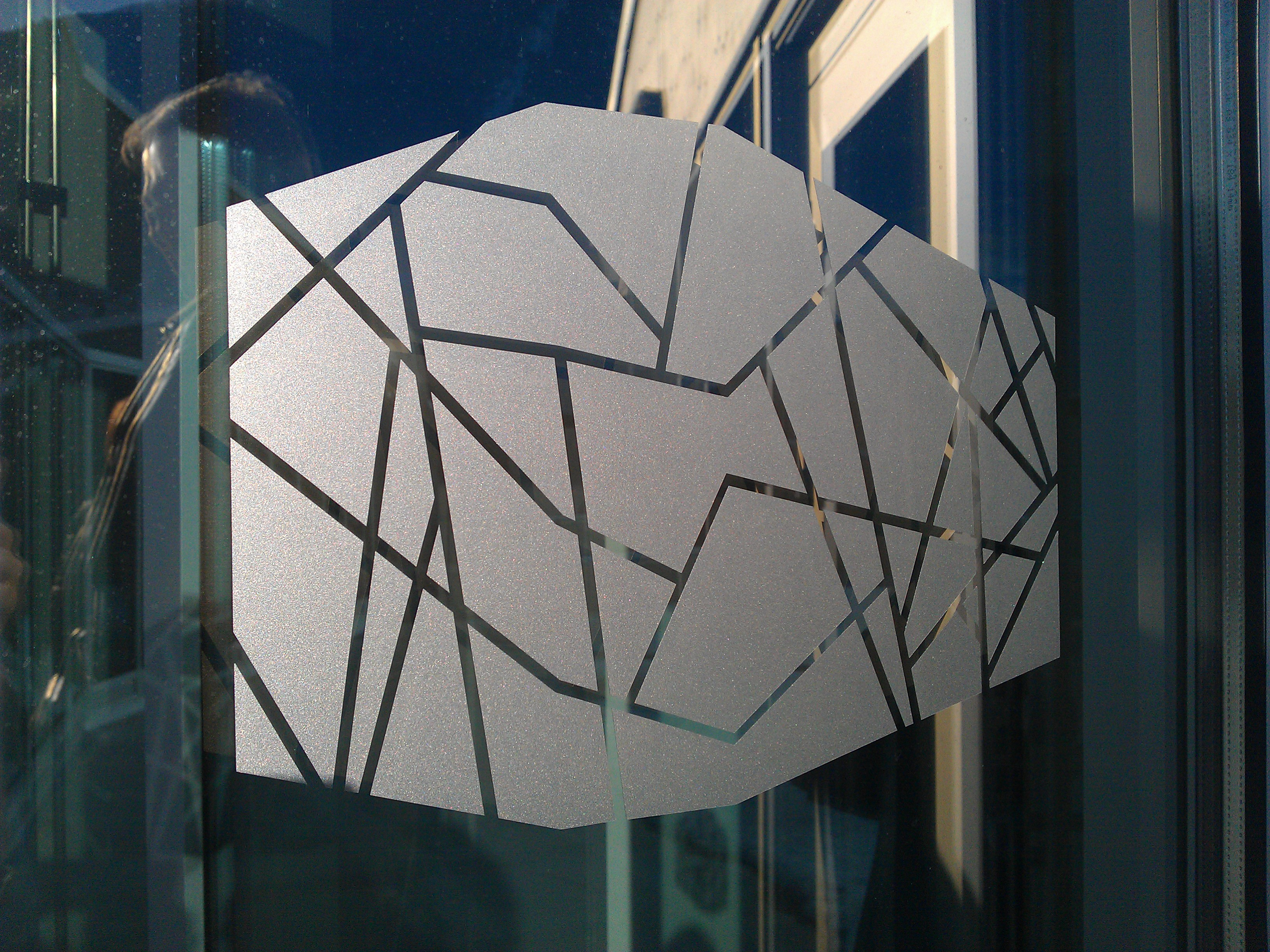
- Logo of the Sogn og Fjordane Art Museum on a glass door

- Location within Vestland
- Established: 1987
- Location: Førde, Norway
- Coordinates: 61°27′07″N 5°51′25″E
- Type: Art museum
- Website: https://www.sfk.museum.no/

The Sogn og Fjordane Art Museum (Norwegian: Sogn og Fjordane Kunstmuseum) is an art museum located in Førde, Norway. The museum was established in 1987. The museum was initially called the Sogn og Fjordane County Gallery (Norwegian: Fylkesgalleriet i Sogn og Fjordane), and it adopted its current name in 2000.

In 2004, the museum was transformed into a foundation responsible for operating the Anders Svor Museum in Hornindal Municipality, the Astrup Farm and Eikaas Gallery in Jølster Municipality, the Gjesme Gallery (now the Sogn Art Center) in Lærdal Municipality, and the Sogn og Fjordane Art Museum and Sogn og Fjordane Artists' Center in Førde. In 2009, the museum was consolidated into the consortium Museums of Sogn og Fjordane together with the Coastal Museum in Sogn og Fjordane, Nordfjord Folk Museum, the Sunnfjord Museum, and the Heiberg Collections—Sogn Folk Museum.

In 2011, a new building for the Sogn Art Center was opened in Lærdal, in 2012 a new building was opened for the Sogn og Fjordane Art Museum in Førde, and in 2014 the interior of the Anders Svor Museum was renovated in connection with the 150th anniversary of Anders Svor's birth.

The Sogn og Fjordane Art Museum holds about 4,000 works of art.
