= Seducia =

Studio album by Silentium
- Released: 2006
- Recorded: 2004–2006
- Genre: Gothic metal
- Length: 48:45
- Label: Dynamic Arts Records

Seducia is the fourth studio album by the Finnish gothic metal band Silentium. The album was released in Finland on January 25, worldwide on January 27 and on April 23 in Germany, Austria, and Switzerland. It is their first album featuring an appearance by female singer Riina Rinkinen. The album spawned two singles: "Frostnight" and "Dead Silent".

== Critical reception ==
Professional ratings
Review scores
Source	Rating
Metal Hammer Germany	6/7
RockHard	7.0/10

The reviewer for the Canadian Exclaim! magazine wrote that the album presented both "bombasticism" and sensuality, but noted an occasional drag in the songs. The German edition of metal hammer Metal Hammer marked the production and musical quality of the album, and compared singer Rinkinen to Helen Vogt of Flowing Tears. Also the RockHard magazine lauded Riina Rinkinen's addition to the Personnel and noted that the band had now reduced the kitsch of previous releases.

== Track listing ==
Seducia features the following tracks:

No.	Title	Length
1.	"Hangman's Lullaby"	6:27
2.	"Serpentized"	7:00
3.	"Dead Silent"	4:42
4.	"Unbroken"	5:12
5.	"Frostnight"	4:16
6.	"Children Of Chaos"	4:37
7.	"Empress Of The Dark"	6:12
8.	"Seducia"	10:19
Total length:		48:45

== Personnel ==
- Matti Aikio – vocals, bass
- Sami Boman – keyboard, backing vocals
- Elias Kahila – cello
- Toni Lahtinen – guitar
- Juha Lehtioksa – guitar
- Jari Ojala – drums
- Riina Rinkinen – vocals
