= Hans Holmen =

Norwegian painter and sculptor (1878–1958)

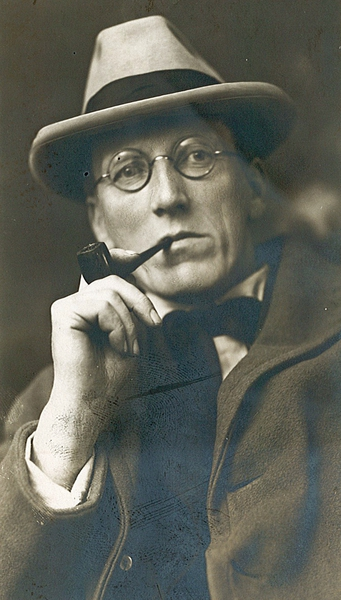
- Born: January 8, 1878; Hedrum, Norway
- Died: August 16, 1958 (aged 80); Sandefjord, Norway
- Occupations: Painter, sculptor

Hans Holmen (January 8, 1878 – August 16, 1958) was a Norwegian painter and sculptor.

Hans Holmen was born at the Holmen farm in Hedrum Municipality, Norway, the son of the farmer Iver Holmen (1839–1915) and Anne Marie Svartsrød (1835–1916). He studied under Knud Bergslien in 1900, at Harriet Backer's painting school in Kristiania (now Oslo) from 1899 to 1900, and at Kristian Zahrtmann's painting school in Copenhagen the following two years. He debuted at the National Art Exhibition in 1902 with a painting of log driving. He found his motifs largely in his hometown's forestry and agriculture, and he eventually acquired a good reputation as a portrait painter.

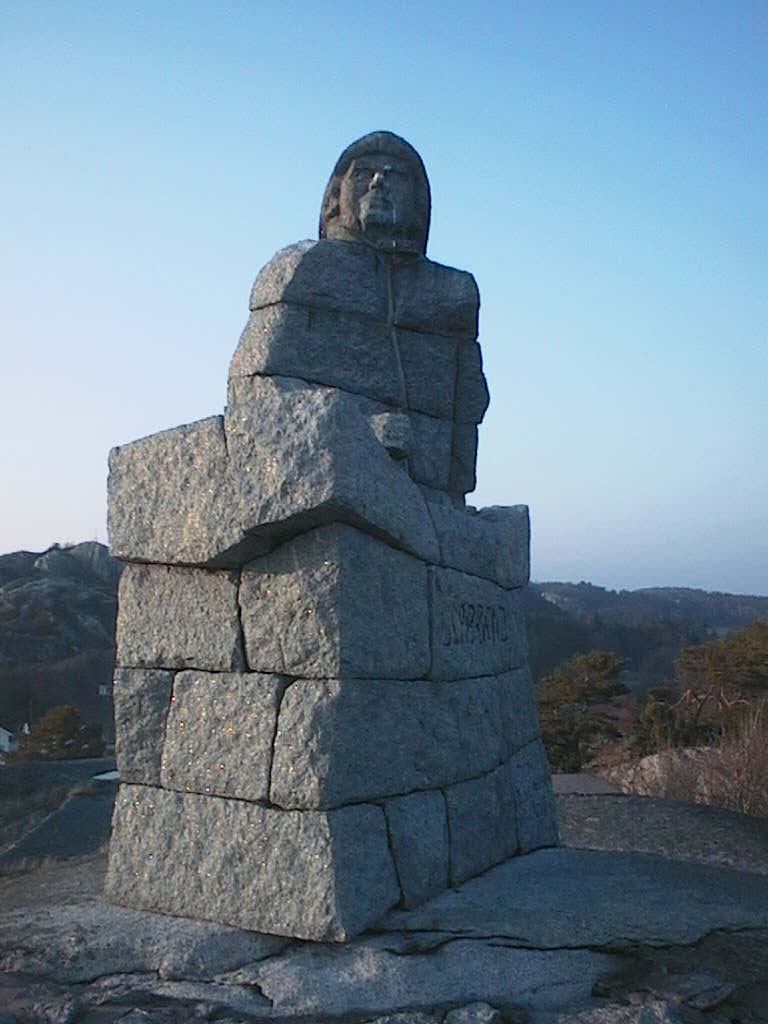
Hans Holmen's 1932 monument to "Ulabrand" (Anders Jacob Johansen, 1815–1881) in Ula facing the Skagerrak

A portrait assignment took him to England and France, where he studied sculpture at the museums. He moved increasingly toward this form of expression while continuing to paint. After the First World War, he settled in Sandefjord, where his sculpture of the priest and hymn writer Magnus Brostrup Landstad was installed in 1928. This was the first time a public statue had been carved from Norwegian hardstein (a blue-gray schist). Together with Myllarguten (1940) at the Nordagutu train station, the Ulabrand monument in Ula (1933), and the bust of Harald Sohlberg in Røros, it is considered his main work. He also created memorials for those that fell in the Second World War at Bommestad in Hedrum Municipality and in Stokke.

Distinctive works by Holmen include many of the tombstones, grave markers, and reliefs, close to 60 altogether, which decorate cemeteries in many places in Norway. Most of these are carved from stone, and a few are bronze reliefs. There are also a few wrought-iron works based on Holmen's sketches. Holmen's early works includes a number of illustrations in some of Lorens Berg's local history books (bygdebøker). Holmen provided decoration for Kodal Church, but his works were removed during later restoration of the church. Holmen also created a statue of Lorens Berg at Prestbyen in Kodal.
