= Altum =

Studio album by Silentium
- Released: 2001
- Recorded: 2000–2001
- Genre: Gothic metal
- Length: 52:48
- Label: Spikefarm Records

Silentium chronology
SI.VM E.T A.V.VM (2001)	Altum (2001)	Sufferion - Hamartia Of Prudence (2003)

Altum is the second studio album recorded by the Finnish Gothic metal band Silentium. The EP album SI.VM E.T A.V.VM was released as Altum's "little sister album", being this one released before Altum. The album was released in 2001 by the Finnish label Spikefarm.

Pedro Azevedo of Chronicles of Chaos rated it a 7 out of 10.

== Track listing ==
1. Revangelis (6:02)
2. Blasphemer (5:50)
3. To My Beloved (5:30)
4. Painless (5:25)
5. ...Repent... (4:27)
6. Into the Arms of the Night... (5:30)
7. The Lusticon (6:54)
8. The Sinful (6:14)
9. The Propheter of the Unenthroned (6:56)

== Personnel ==
- Matti Aikio - vocals, Bass
- Sami Boman - Keyboard, backing vocals
- Jani Laaksonen - Violin
- Toni Lahtinen - Guitar
- Juha Lehtioksa - Guitar
- Tiina Lehvonen - vocals
- Janne Ojala - drums
