= Jacob Aaland =

Norwegian writer (1865–1950)

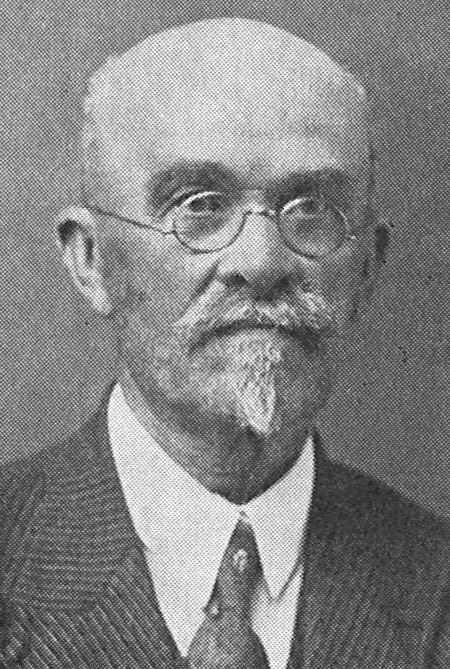
- Born: April 27, 1865; Randabygda, Norway
- Died: October 18, 1950 (aged 85); Gloppen, Norway
- Occupation: Historian

Jacob Aaland (April 27, 1865 – October 18, 1950) was a Norwegian teacher, local historian, and government scholar.

Aaland was a crofter's son. He attended Apalset County School in Gloppen Municipality in the winter of 1881–1882, and then graduated from Stord Normal School in 1884. After that he taught for 48 years, first in Eastern Norway, and then from 1892 to 1932 in Bergen.

While in Bergen, he had several breaks from teaching work for other assignments. He wrote a large number of local history books, and from 1917 to 1919 he was the editor of the newspaper Fjordenes Blad in Nordfjordeid. Aaland was a founding member of the Nordfjord Historical Society (Norwegian: Nordfjord historielag) in 1907. He was appointed a government scholar in 1911 and he received the King's Medal of Merit in gold.

Jacob Aaland died at his home in Sandane at age 86 and is buried in Fredly cemetery there. A bust of Aaland was erected at Rand School in 1976 in his memory. Another bust is located at the Nordfjord Folk Museum in Sandane.
