= Government scholar =

Government scholar (Norwegian: statsstipendiat) is a position awarded by the Parliament of Norway upon the recommendation of the Ministry of Culture and the Ministry of Education and Research and funded directly over the state budget of Norway. The position can be "for life" (until the normal age of retirement, 67 years) or for a limited period of time, although modern appointments usually are "for life." The scholarships are awarded to a select number of persons whose work is deemed important for the society, and who may engage in research, culture or other societal areas. The number of government scholars has gone down in recent years from 48 in 2009, to 15 in 2021.

== List of government scholars ==
The following is a comprehensive list of all government scholars, with the year of appointment. All appointees were included in the Norwegian State Calendar until it ceased publication in 2012.

=== Appointed 2010-present ===
- Evy Johanne Håland, historian (2019)
- Bjarte Bruland, historian (2019)
- Javid Afsari Rad, musician (2017)
- Hans Kolstad, philosopher (2017)
- Mette Tronvoll, artist (2016)
- Bodil Nordjore, cook book author (2016)
- Geir Uthaug, author, lyricist (2015)
- Anne Helgesen, theatre leader (2015)
- Erling Borgen, journalist, director, producer (2014)
- Karoline Frogner, photographer, director, author (2014)
- Mari Boine, artist (2013)
- Morten Jostad, dramatist (2013)
- Peter Normann Waage, author (2013)
- Edvard Hoem, novelist (2012)
- Annemor Sundbø, textile artist (2012)
- Kirsten Bråten Berg, folk musician (2011)
- Per Haave, historian (2011)
- Elias Akselsen, singer (2010)
- Lars Borgersrud, historian (2010)

=== Appointed 2000-2009 ===
- Tore Berg, botanist (2009)
- Helgard Mahrdt, literature scholar and philosopher (2009)
- Tor Bomann-Larsen, author (2009)
- Petter Ringen Johannessen, historian (2008)
- Wenche Blomberg, criminologist (2008)
- Hans Kristian Bukholm, film and cultural conservation worker (2008)
- Jan Knutzen, documentary filmmaker and film historian (2008)
- Walid al-Kubaisi, author, translator and writer (2007)
- Morten Wessel Krogstad, cultural conservation worker (2007)
- Britt Karin Larsen, author (2006)
- Guttorm Rogdaberg, cultural conservation worker (2006)
- Eugene Schoulgin, author, PEN activist (2006)
- Bjørn Stendahl, jazz historian (2006)
- Ragnar Andersen, theologian (2005)
- Aage Hauken, Catholic priest and author (2005)
- Åge Haavik, hymn book editor (leave from the scheme) (2005)
- Amy Lightfoot, cultural conservationist (2005)
- Arild Stubhaug, author and biographer (2005)
- Øystein Rottem, author and literature critic (2004)
- Per Arne Dahl, priest and author (2004)
- Tormod Haugen, children's book author (2004)
- Marianne Heske, visual artist (2004)
- Nina Karin Monsen, philosopher and author (2004)
- Thorvald Steen, author (2004)
- Eystein Eggen, author (2003)
- Egil Kapstad, jazz musician (2003)
- Else Rønnevig, building protection enthusiast (2003)
- Solveig Bøhle, journalist (2002)
- Torunn Ystaas, author (2002)
- Sverre Ødegaard, museum worker from Røros (2002)
- Jon Fosse, author and playwright (2001)
- Else-Britt Nilsen, theologian and prior in the Dominican Order (2001)

=== Appointed 1990-1999 ===
- Sigmund Kvaløy Setreng, eco philosopher and farmer (1999)
- Sondre Bratland, folk singer and pedagogue (1997)
- Lars Roar Langslet, historian of ideas, writer (1997)
- Johannes Bergh, jazzhistorian (1996)
- Valerij Berkov, Russian philologist (1996)
- Sverre Dahl, translator (1996)
- Wera Sæther, author (1996)
- Turid Farbregd, university lecturer, translator and philologist (1995)
- Jiri Hlinka, pianist (1995)
- Axel Jensen, author (1995)
- Jørund Gåsemyr, mathematician and athlete (paralympics) (1994)
- Egil Sinding-Larsen, architectural historian (1994)
- Nils-Aksel Mjøs, theologian (1994)
- Arvid Hanssen, author (1993)
- Sidsel Mørck, author (1993)
- Mikal Urheim, promoter of the Lule Sami language (1993)
- Hans Kristian Eriksen, author (1992)
- Helge Irgens Høeg, pollenanalytiker, bl.a. innen arkeologi (1992)
- Dag Skogheim, author and culture historian (1992)
- Judith Vogt, Danish-Norwegian Professor of history of ideas (1992)
- Jan Erik Vold, author and critic (1992)
- Elisabeth Aasen, author, historian (1992)
- Hallvard T. Bjørgum, folk musician (1991)
- Frank Bjerkholt, foreign correspondent (1990)
- Dagne Groven Myhren, Professor of literature, folk singer (1990)
- Kjell Risvik, translator (1990)
- Frode J. Strømnes, Professor of psychology (1990)

=== Appointed 1980-1989 ===
- Knut Buen, folk musician, folk art communicator (1989)
- Olav Albert Christophersen, biologist, epidemiologist (1989)
- Ivar Eskeland, writer and columnist (1989)
- Brynjulf Fosse, paper and papyrus conservator (1989)
- Karen-Christine Friele, author and gay rights activist (1989)
- Sven Nyhus, folk musician, professor (1989)
- Finn Sollie, Security Policy Researcher (1989)
- Kåre Svebak, theologian, north Norwegian church historian (1989)
- Knut Ødegård, author (1989)
- Erik Dammann, author and environmental activist (1988)
- Iver Jåks, visual artist (1988)
- Aleksander Kan, philologist (1988)
- Kjell Bækkelund, musician (1987)
- Odd Eidem, author (1987)
- Pål Hougen, art historian (1987)
- Hans Lindkjølen, Sami historian (1987)
- Martin Nag, writer, literature historian (1987)
- Ørnulf Hodne, folklore researcher (1986)
- Georg Johannesen, author, professor (1986)
- Lillemor Johnsen, respiratory therapist (1986)
- Øistein Parmann, author and publisher (1986)
- Bjørn Stabell, psychologist (1986)
- Ulf Stabell, psychologist (1986)
- Gidske Anderson, journalist, writer (1985)
- Fredrik Barth, social anthropologist (1985)
- Nils Ellingsgard, cultural conservationist and facilitator in Norwegian rose painting (1985)
- Helge Hognestad, theologian (1985)
- Liv Dommersnes, actor (1984)
- Thor Heyerdahl, traveler, amateur archaeologist and ethnographer (1984)
- Åge Rønning, author (1984)
- Olav Aspelund, civil engineer (1983)
- Mentz Schulerud, author, theatre director and columnist (1983)
- Kjell Aartun, linguist (1983)
- John Brandrud, philologist, university librarian (1982)
- Kari Elisabeth Børresen, historian of ideas, historian of women's theology (1982)
- Odd Solumsmoen, literary critic (1982)
- Ada Polak, art historian (1981)
- Odd Bakkerud, folk musician (1980)
- Odd Brochmann, architect, professor (1980)
- Ivar Orgland, lyricist and translator (1980)
- Arnulv Sudmann, editor of the Norsk Allkunnebok and language bureaucrat (1980)

=== Appointed 1970-1979 ===
- Otto Blehr, folklorist (1978)
- Halvard Grude Forfang, teacher (1978)
- Peter Wessel Zapffe, philosopher (1978)
- Nils Hallan, historian (1977)
- Philip Houm, literature historian (1977)
- Anne Stine Ingstad, archaeologist (1977)
- Per Bjørnstad, mathematician (1976)
- Svein Ellingsen, hymn writer (1976)
- Tønnes Sirevåg, school leader (1976)
- Arne Dørumsgaard, lyricist and translator (1975)
- Olav Flo, bibliographer (1975)
- Hartvig W. Dannevig, Maritime Historian (1974)
- Edvard Ruud, author and folklorist (1974)
- Hans J. Henriksen, Sami consultant (1973)
- Gabriel Øidne, geographer (1973)
- Henning Gran, art historian (1972)
- Else Christie Kielland, painter (1972)
- Ragnar Ulstein, historian (1972)
- Finn Carling, author (1971)
- Milada Blekastad, literature historian (1970)
- Helge Ingstad, author and adventurer (1970)

=== Appointed 1950-1969 ===
- Sverre Hartmann, historian (1968)
- Otto Christian Dahl, missionary historian (1967)
- Leif Jarmann Wilhelmsen, bureaucrat (1967)
- H.O. Christophersen, historian (1965)
- Nic. Stang, art historian (1964)
- Jeremi M.F. Wasiutynski, astronomer (1964)
- Ingvar Hauge, author (1963)
- Trygve Mathisen, security policy researcher (1963)
- Olav Dalgard, art and literature historian (1961)
- Asgaut Steinnes, national archivist (1961)
- Per Fokstad, educator, Sami language proponent (1960)
- Arne Odd Johnsen, historian (1958)
- Nils A. Ytreberg, historian (1958)
- Hans Henrik Holm, lyricist (1957)
- Lars Reinton, ethnologist (1957)
- Kristian Kildal, painter (1956)
- Axel Otto Normann, newspaperman, theatre chief (1955)
- Sigmund Torsteinson, conservationist of Troldhaugen (1955)
- Knut Hermundstad, folk high school teacher, folklorist (1954)
- Inge Krokann, author (1954)
- Sverre Steen, historian (1954)
- Herman Leopoldus Løvenskiold, heraldic artist (1952)
- Magnus B. Olsen, name researcher (1952)
- Ingebrigt Christopher Grøndahl, literature historian (1950)
- Erling Johansen, self-taught archaeologist (1950)
- Reidar Øksnevad, journalist, bibliographer (1950)

=== Appointed 1920-1949 ===
- Vilhelm Bjerknes, meteorologist (1949)
- Arne Bjørndal, folk music collector (1949)
- Rolv Thesen, literature historian (1949)
- Rolv Laache, historian and Wergeland biographer (1947)
- Bjarne Aagaard, historian (1941)
- Bernhard Færøyvik, coastal historian (1938)
- Ingjald Nissen, philosopher and psychologist (1938)
- Olav Sannes, local historian (1934)
- Idar Handagard, physician, botanist, teetotaler (1932)
- Carsten E. Borchgrevink, polar explorer and historian (1929)
- Ivar Mortensson-Egnund, theologian, author (1929)
- Frederik Macody Lund, historian (1929)
- Otto Sverdrup, polar explorer (1926)
- Alexander Seippel, bible translator (1923)
- Axel Drolsum, librarian (1922)
- Albert Kjær, place-name researcher (1922)
- Matti Aikio, author (1921)
- Albert Joleik, local historian, redaktør (1921)
- Halfdan Arneberg, folkart historian (1921)
- Gerhard Gran, literature historian (1920)
- Just Qvigstad, preserver of Sami language and culture (1920)

=== Appointed 1876-1919 ===
- Anton Aure, bibliographer (1919)
- Oluf Kolsrud, church historian (1919)
- Thomas Parr, psychology (1919)
- Hans Reynolds, journalist, writer (1919)
- Tov Flatin, local historian and folklorist (1918)
- Thomas Georg Münster, entomologist (1918)
- G.O. Sars, ocean researcher (1918)
- Olai Skulerud, dialect researcher (1918)
- Richard Eriksen, philosopher (1917)
- Jon Laberg, local historian (1917)
- Edvard Langset, folklorist (1917)
- Anders Nummedal, archaeologist (1917)
- Olaf Olafsen, theologian, culture historian (1917)
- Jørgen Reitan, teacher, dialect researcher (1917)
- Ole Knutsen Ødegaard, mayor, local historian (1917)
- Torstein Høverstad, historian (1916)
- Alexander Bugge, historian (1914)
- Adolf Fonahn, historian of medicine, orientalist (1914)
- Torleiv Hannaas, philologist, professor (1914)
- Eugen Jørgensen, botanist (1914)
- Torkell Mauland, folklorist (1914)
- Erik Vullum, journalist, public speaker (1914)
- Roald Amundsen, polar explorer (1913)
- Kristian Birch-Reichenwald Aars, philosopher (1913)
- Kristian Østberg, jurist and folklorist (1912)
- Lorens Berg, folklorist (1911)
- Jacob Aaland, local historian (1911)
- Ivar Kleiven, folklorist, local historian (1909)
- Johan Meyer, folkart historian (1909)
- Steinar Schjøtt, dictionary editor (1909)
- Sigurd Einbu, astronomer (1908)
- Thorbjørn Frølich, theologian, society economist (1908)
- Andreas Hansen, geologist and ethnographer (1908)
- Georg Reiss, composer, music historian (1908)
- Søren Anton Sørensen, historian (1908)
- Amund B. Larsen, dialect researcher (1901)
- Catharinus Elling, folk music collector (1899)
- Olav Sande, folk music collector (1899)
- Ole Andreas Øverland, historian (1898)
- Johannes Skar, folklorist (1897)
- Andreas Aubert, art historian (1895)
- Jørgen Alexander Knudtzon, assyriologist (1894)
- Wilhelmine Brandt, genealogist (1893)
- Johannes Belsheim, theologian (1880)
- Hans Ross, lexicographer (1877)
- Johannes M. Norman, forester, botanist (1876)
