= Stev =

Norwegian folk music

Stev is a form of Norwegian folk song consisting of four line lyric stanzas. The English version of the word is stave, meaning the stressed syllable in a metric verse.

== Various types ==
There are various types of stev:

=== Gamlestev ===
- gamlestev (old stave) is the oldest type. It is likely that gamlestev were originally danced. Stanzas in gamlestev meter, were already established around the end of the 13th century.

Of the gamlestev that have been preserved, most of them are from Setesdal and øvre Telemark . This poetic form is equivalent to the metre of the medieval ballad, and is used over most of Northern Europe:

Oh who will shoe my bonny foot
and who will glove my hand
and who will lace my middle waist
with a long, long linen band.

The metre in most old staves is free, and the rhyming is always on the second and fourth line.

Some gamlestev might be remnants of folk songs that have been split up, and thereby losing completeness.

=== Nystev ===
- Nystev (new stave) have probably been around since about the year 1700. "It is the Norwegian counterpart to blues from America", wrote Geirr Lystrup (in 1980).

In Telemark, nystev have been replaced by rural folksongs, to a great extent. By contrast, nystev in Setesdal have held much of their ground. Many folksongs are based on the form, which rhymes in pairs:

Den dag kjem aldri at eg deg gløymer
for når eg søver, eg om deg drøymer.
og natt og dag er du like nær,
men best eg ser deg når myrkt det er.

=== Omkved ===
- omkved (refrain in ballads), includes innstev, etterstev, mellomsleng and ettersleng.

=== Slåttestev ===
- slåttestev (tune-staves) are instrumental dancetune songs. This is dancetunes with a short text. Sometimes the staves grows to longer songs. In Ireland, an equivalent would be The Rocky Road to Dublin, a tune which is both a dance-tune and a song.

=== Hermestev ===
- hermestev (imitating staves) are often referred to as parody-quote stev. These contain Wellerisms.

== Origin ==
Some researchers have presented theories about stev "relating to language and poetry rather than to slowed-down dance": Ivar Mortensson-Egnund (in 1914), Idar Handagard (in 1942), O.M. Sandvik, Eivind Groven (1971), Jon Storm-Mathisen (2002 and 2007) and Jacqueline Pattison Ekgren (1975 and 2007). ("Handagard points out that much Norwegian folk poetry, including stev, has strong elements of alliterative rhyme and rhythm which he claims shows an unbroken tradition from Old Norse folk poetry. Storm-Mathisen demonstrates in his writing and audio recordings of stanzas from Old Norse eddic Havamal sung-recited to gamlestev and ballad melodies that there are good arguments for the theory of an unbroken tradition and non-dance origin of stev.")

"Theories in the last century connecting nystev with dance" have been presented by Erik Eggen (in 1928 and 1939), Hallvard Lie (1967), Otto Holzapfel (1993), Ånon Egeland (1998) and Reimund Kvideland (2002). These theories were started by Richard Steffen's claim in 1898 that "nystev were originally dance songs, even though he had never seen them danced."

== Performers ==
A person who can perform a stev, is known as a kveder (or "kvedar"), in Norwegian.

Previously "A good kvedar [really had to know] knew how to stevja", wrote Geirr Lystrup (in 1980). ("To stevjast is a social form of songkamp ["song" + "battle"], where the object is to know many stev so one will not be at loss (or become perplexed)."

A kveder from Setesdal, when performing stev, generally sings more slowly, than a kveder from Telemark. One reason for this, may be that Setesdal stev are often more meditative ( or elegiac ), in regard to the stev text.

== Notable performances ==
In 1945, Aslak Brekke's performance at "liberation of Norway" concert that was held 1945, in the ceremonial hall (the "Aula") at the University of Oslo. In 1983, a member of Norway's national team of football, Åge Hareide, was honored with a stev (performed by another member of the team, Svein Mathisen) related to Hareides receipt of the Norwegian Football Association Gold Watch (Norwegian: Gullklokka — signifying 25 matches played for Norway's national team). The stev was performed at the banquet in Yugoslavia following a football match of two national teams, and the performer held the head of the lamb that had been eaten at the banquet, while he performed from a tabletop. (The watch was received before the match.)
