= Anders Jacob Johansen =

Maritime pilot in Norway

- Born: 1815; Eftang, Tjølling, Norway
- Died: November 28, 1881 (aged 65–66); Off the coast of Tjøme, Norway
- Other name: Ulabrand
- Occupation: Maritime pilot

Anders Jacob Johansen (1815 – November 28, 1881, surname also Johanessen or Johannessøn), known as Ulabrand, was a maritime pilot who lived in Ula in Vestfold, Norway. He served as pilot in Ula from about 1850 until he perished in a fall storm in 1881, when his pilot boat was lost in the open sea south of Tjøme for unknown reasons.

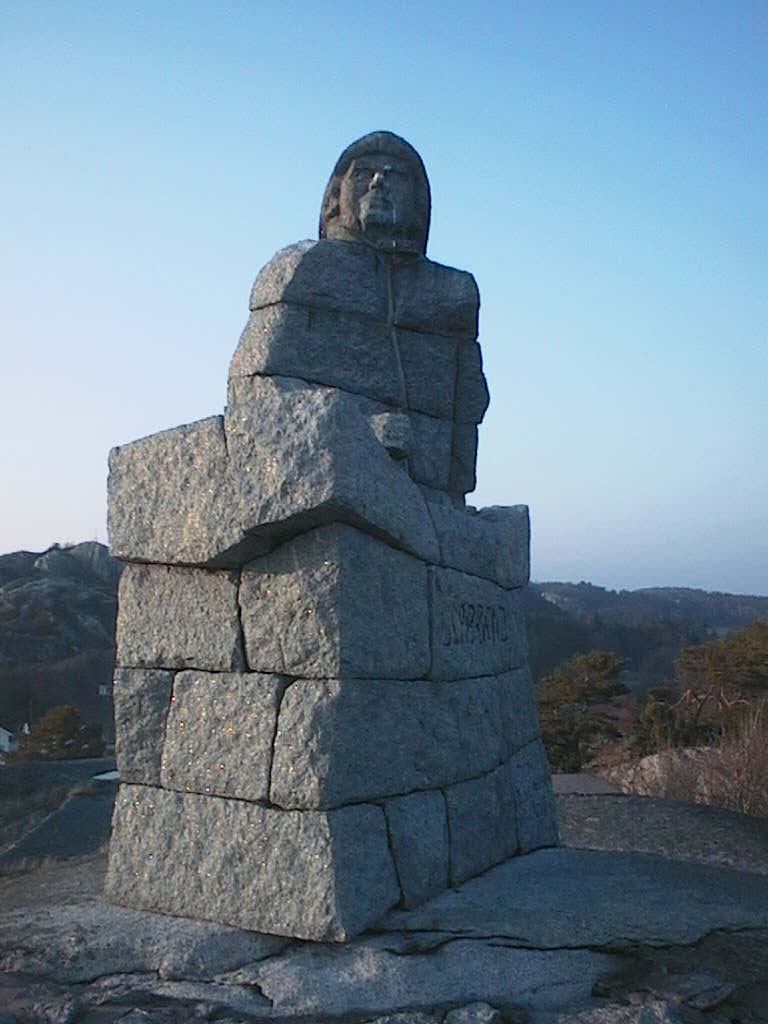
Hans Holmen's 1932 monument to "Ulabrand" (Anders Jacob Johansen) in Ula facing the Skagerrak

At the end of the 19th century, the pilots themselves had to hail ships needed piloting. The pilot's fee was paid to the one that arrived first and brought the ship safely into port. The pilots therefore used lookout points with a good vantage to be able to detect boats early on their way into the Oslo Fjord. There was ruthless competition between them, often at risk of life, to reach the ships. The pilots helped bring many boats into safety in port during storms in the Skagerrak. Ulabrand is seen as a symbol of good seamanship and the important service that pilots performed for safety at sea.

There are many stories about Ulabrand and his bravado, most of them probably exaggerated. He is described as a sailor of the right cast, daring when necessary, brave, and resourceful, but also enjoying drinking and being exceptionally kind-hearted and good-natured.

== Ulabrand monument ==
A monument to Johansen was created by the sculptor Hans Holmen in 1932 and was installed at the site where the pilots of Ula had their lookout point.

== Legacy ==
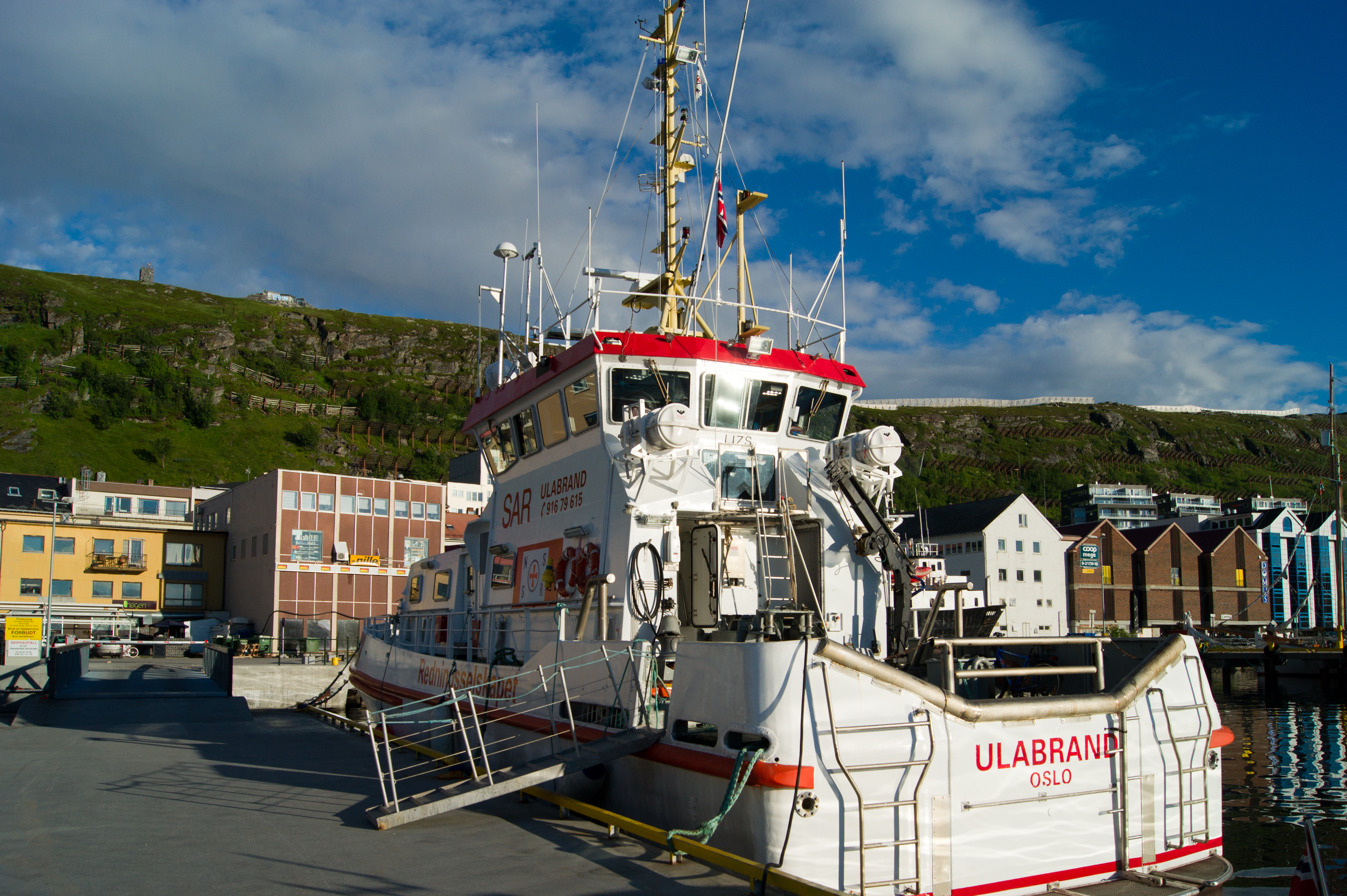
The Ulabrand III

The song "Ulabrand" (melody by Kristian Wendelborg, 1863–1938, and lyrics by Peter Rosenkrantz Johnsen, 1857–1929) was popular at Norwegian-American events in the early 20th century. The violinist Paul Fjellboe also named one of his compositions "Ulabrand." The Ulabrand Singing Society was established in LaCrosse, Wisconsin in 1910. The Sons of Norway in San Pedro, Los Angeles named its Lodge Ulabrand after Johansen in 1926. The Norwegian Society for Sea Rescue has a rescue boat named Ulabrand III after Johansen; the vessel was built in 1998.
