= Eugene Schoulgin =

Norwegian writer and government scholar (born 1941)

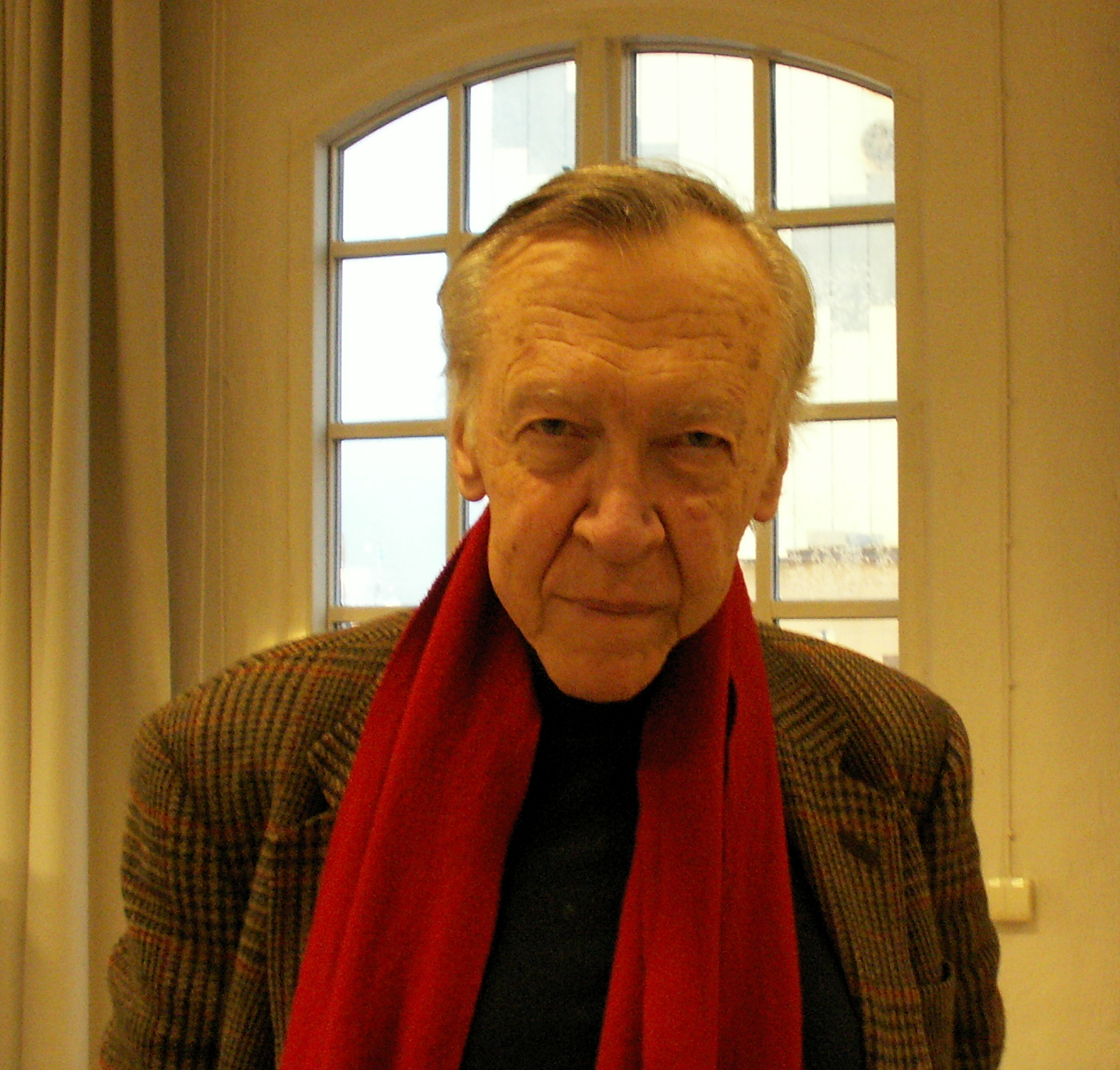
Eugene Schoulgin

Eugene Schoulgin (born April 19, 1941, in Oslo) is a Norwegian writer and government scholar.

He is the son of the painter Alexander Schultz, and grew up in Norway, Italy and France. He attended high school in Oslo (1960). He has studied Classical Archaeology and Art History at the universities of Uppsala and Stockholm. He was married in Stockholm in 1964 and has three children.

He lives in Oslo, Norway.

== Life & accomplishments ==
Schoulgin relates that he has spent much of his life travelling, especially in South Europe, but also in Eastern Europe, Turkey, Iran, Afghanistan and Pakistan.

"I visited Afghanistan in 1972 (10 months) 1976 (2 months) and were then returned twice in 2003 and in 2004 and 2005. I have traveled almost all over Afghanistan."

In 2004, with Elisabeth Eide, he edited the anthology "Bitter Almonds", which contains translations of texts by authors with ties to Kabul.

He has long worked actively for the organization PEN International, a writers' organization that among other issues, works for release of imprisoned writers all over the world. He became a member of the Swedish PEN in 1992 and become president of its WiPC (Writers in Prison Committee) in 1994. In 2000 he was elected president of International PEN WiPC, a post he held until 2004. From 2004 he sat on the board of PEN International. As president of WiPC, he has traveled in many parts of the world in order to release authors, publishers and journalists in prison. He made several visits to countries like Peru, Mexico, South Korea and Afghanistan.

His books have been translated into Turkish, German, Russian and Slovak.

In 1985 he was nominated for the Nordic Council Literature Prize for his novel Minner om Mirella ("Memories of Mirella”). In 2006 he was appointed Norwegian government scholarship for his work with International PEN. Schoulgin lives in Oslo.

In 2014, he was awarded the Norwegian Authors' Union's Honorary Prize.
