= Anton Aure =

Norwegian teacher (1884 - 1924)

Anton Magnus Aure
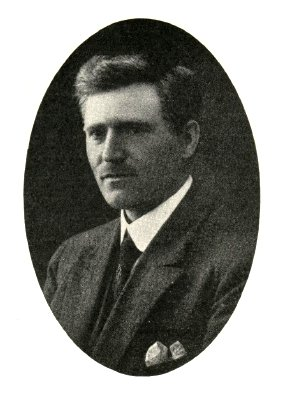
- Born: 15 January 1884; Fræna Municipality, Norway
- Died: 18 July 1924 (aged 40); Asker Municipality, Norway
- Occupations: Schoolteacher; Bibliographer

Anton Magnus Aure (15 January 1884 – 18 July 1924) was a Norwegian schoolteacher, bibliographer and book collector.

== Personal life ==
Aure was born in Fræna Municipality to farmer Jakob Sivertson Aure and Beret Pedersdatter Orten. In 1911 he married Hallgerd Malmfrid Røsok (died 1913), and in 1918 he married Marta Johanne Aadna.

== Career ==
Aure graduated as schoolteacher in 1911. Aside of his teaching job, he started to collect books written in Nynorsk. His extensive collection was basis for a bibliography of literature published in Nynorsk, and Aure was appointed government scholar in 1919. He started and edited the monthly magazine Ung-Norig in 1918. His publications include the poetry collection Lauv og lyng (1908), Kvinnor i den nynorske bokheimen (1916), Nynorsk boklista. Skrifter i bokform på norsk (two volumes, 1916 and 1921), Ungdom og bøker (1923), Norskt Bladmannalag gjenom 10 aar (1923, jointly with Hans Aarnes), and Prestar som talar nynorsk (1924). His collection of about 6,000 volumes was acquired by the publishing house Det Norske Samlaget after his death, and eventually administered by the National Library of Norway.

He died in Asker Municipality in 1924.
