= Ole Andreas Øverland =

Norwegian historian (1855–1911)

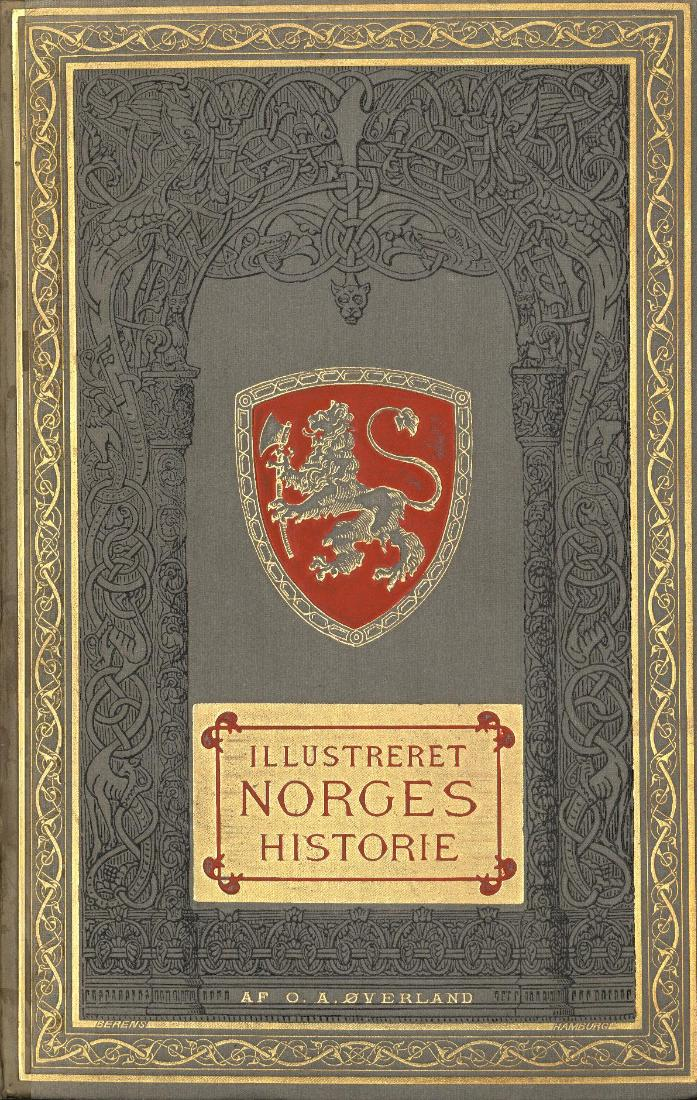
Illustreret Norges historie

Ole Andreas Øverland (17 March 1855 – 20 June 1911) was a Norwegian historian, writer and illustrator. He was characterized by Terje Bratberg as "one of the most prolific historians Norway has produced". He is best known for writing and illustrating two editions of a history of Norway; Illustreret Norges Historie (published by Folkebladet, Kristiania)

== Biography ==
Øverland was born in Trondhjem (now Trondheim), Norway. He was the son of Ole Andreas Øverland (1819-1871) and his wife Gjertine Birgitte Moe (1818-1881). He graduated from Trondheim Cathedral School in 1873. Two years later he was awarded his philosophicum. He worked for a few years as a teacher before moving to Christiania (now Oslo) in 1878. He worked at the National Archives of Norway (Riksarkivet) until 1885. In 1880 he was awarded a Peter Andreas Munch scholarship (P. A. Munchs legat).

He then began writing what would become the first edition of his Illustreret Norges Historie, which was published in five volumes from 1885 to 1895. He was at the same time developing a 12-volume edition of the work, finishing in 1898. In between working on this major work which received funding from Stortinget, he also wrote a number of other, smaller studies, biographies, and reviews. He produced a variety of historical works and published several textbooks. He was made a Government scholar (statsstipendiat) in 1898.

== Selected works ==
- Huset Bernadotte, 1882
- Professor Dr. Ludvig Daae. En biografisk Skisse, 1884
- Lærebog i Norges nyeste historie, 1886
- Fra en svunden tid. Sagn og optegnelser, 1888
- Vikingtog og Vinlandsfærder, 1896
- Af Sagnet og Historien, 1897
- Borgerne paa Fredrikshald. Skildringer fra krigen aar 1716, 1897
- Korstogenes Historie, 1900
- Oberst Hans Helgesen, 1903
- Thraniterbevægelsen, 1903
- Da vort kongepar kom. Mindeblad fra Norges nyeste historie, 1906
- Det gamle Norge i billeder og tekst, 1910

== Gallery of illustration ==
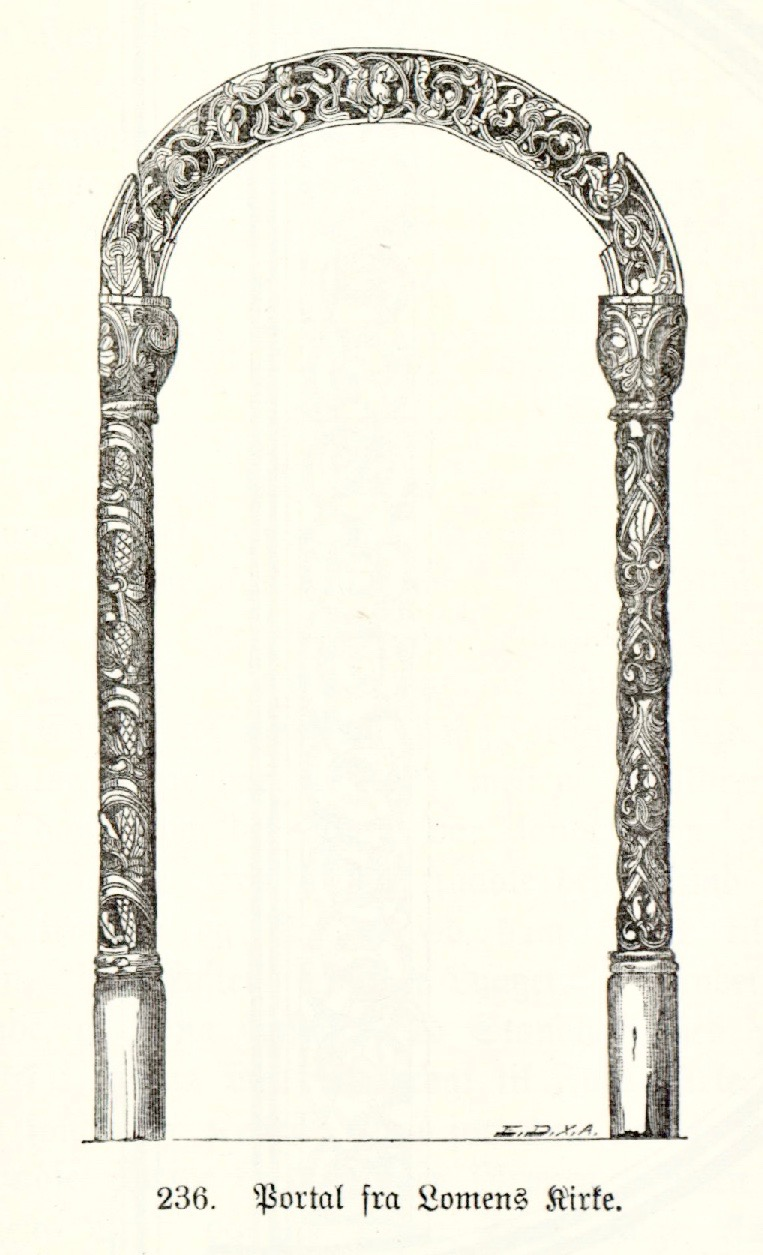

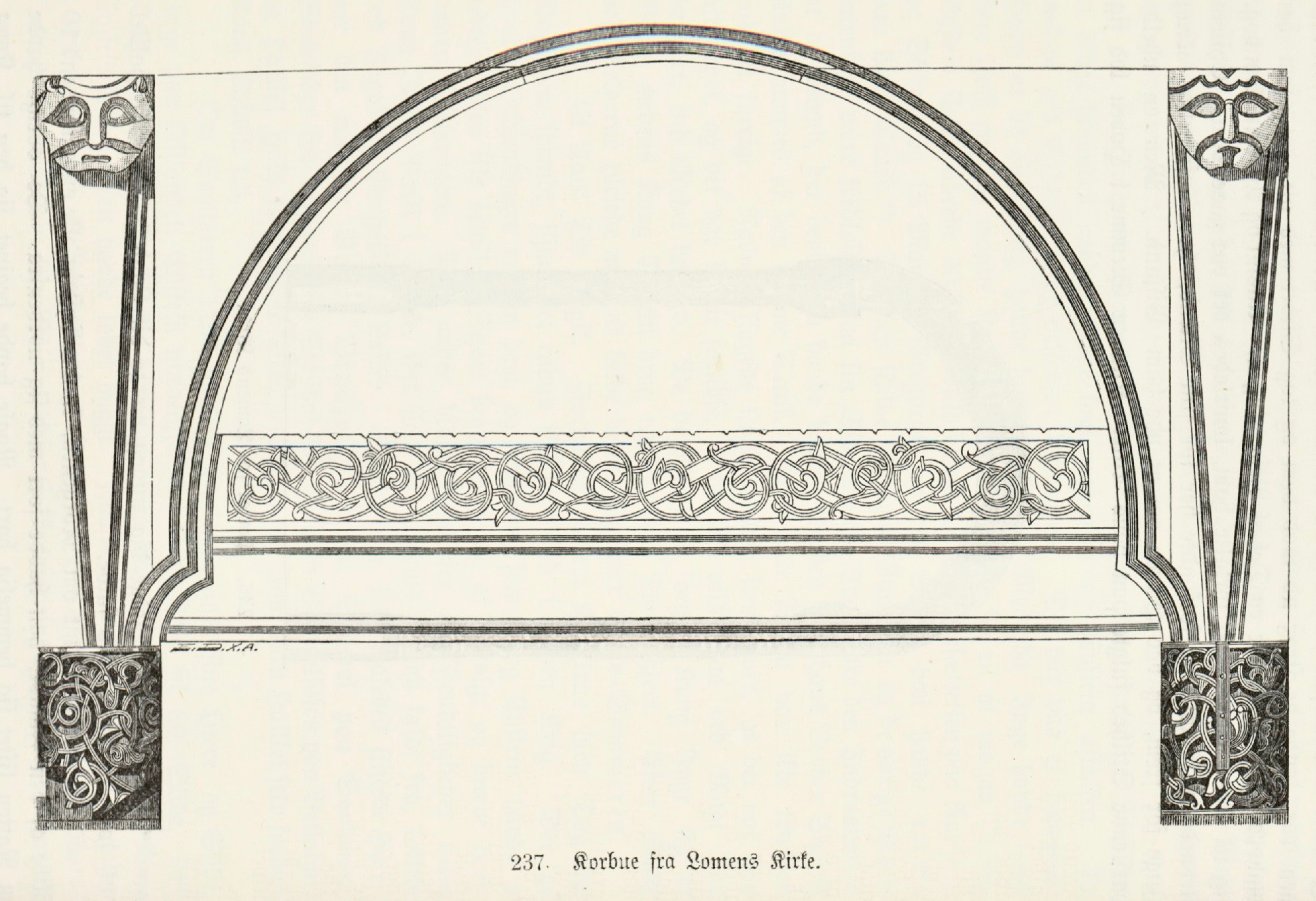

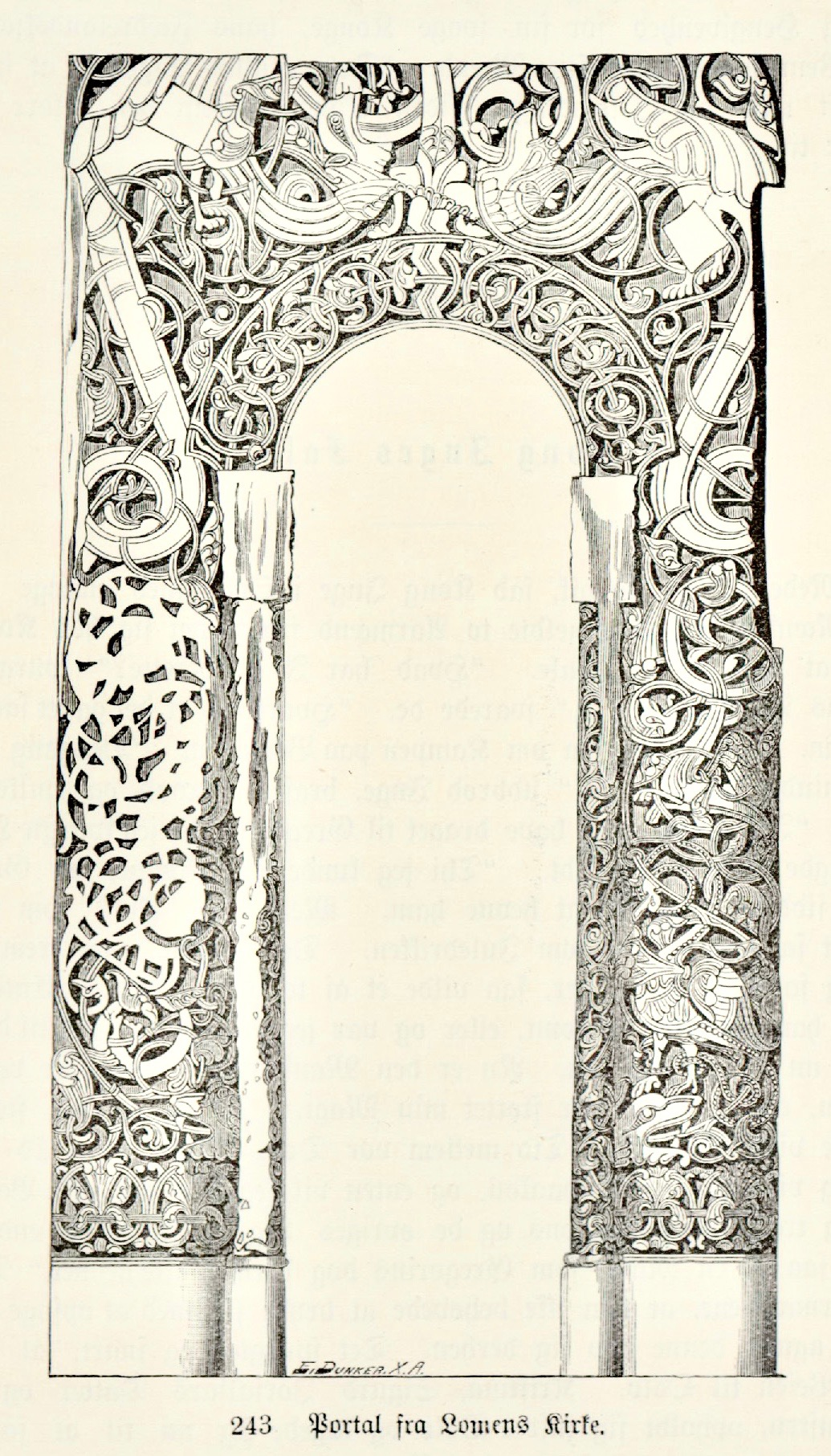

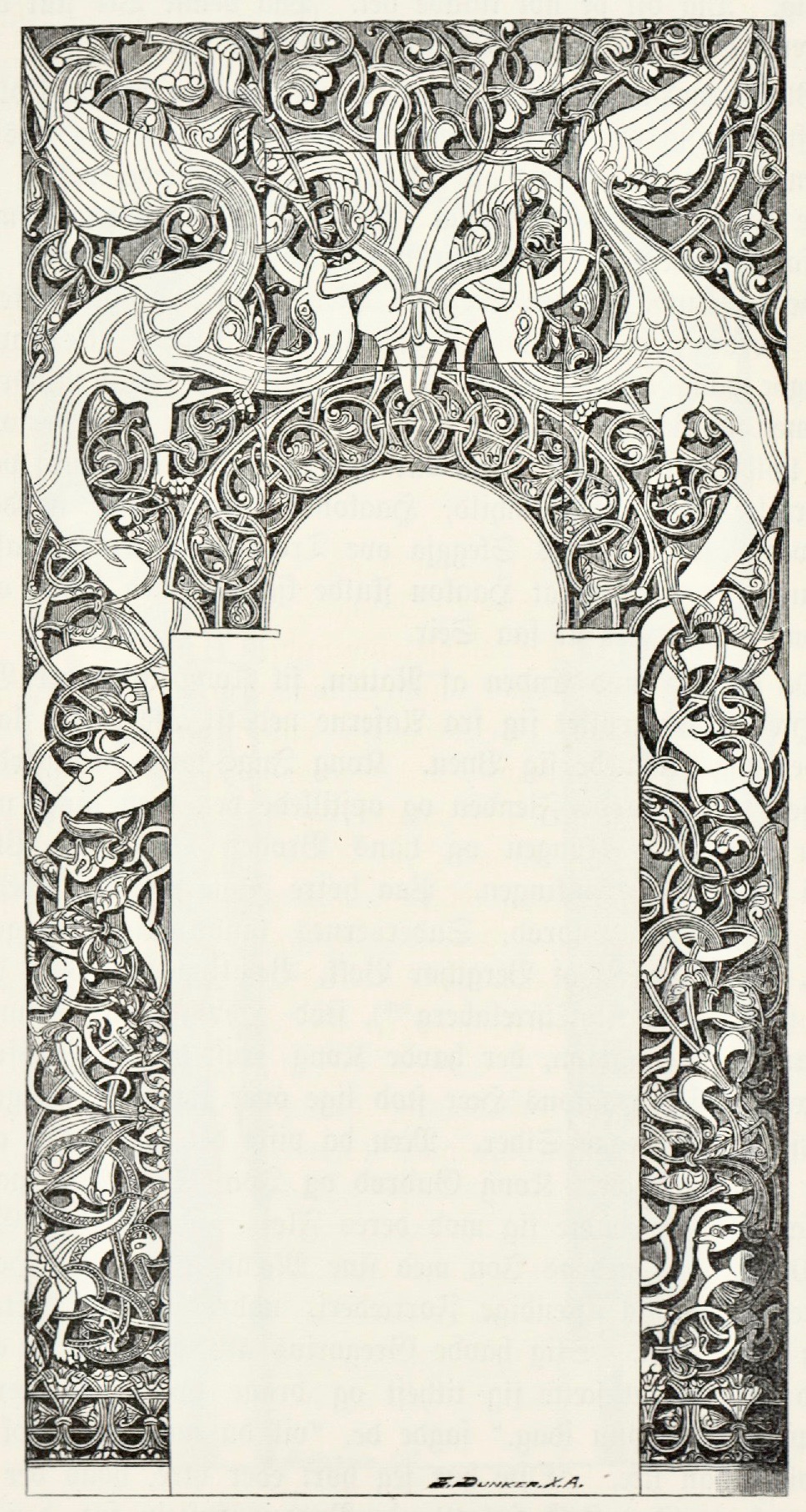
