= Museums of Sogn og Fjordane =

- Musea i Sogn og Fjordane
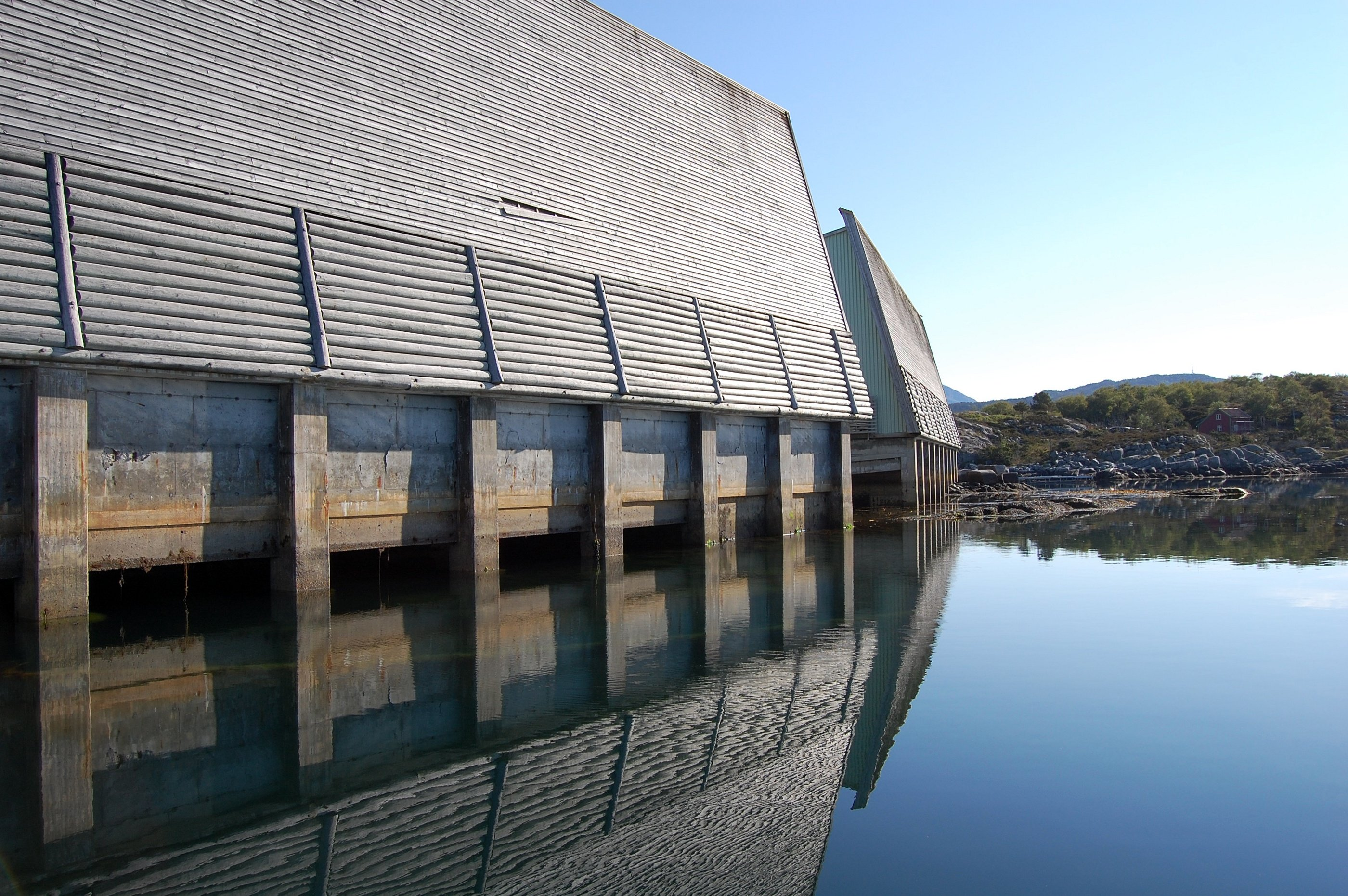
- The Coastal Museum in Sogn og Fjordane

- Location within Vestland
- Established: 2009
- Location: Sandane, Norway
- Coordinates: 61°46′22″N 6°13′16″E
- Type: Folk museum
- Website: https://misf.no/

Museums of Sogn og Fjordane (Norwegian: Musea i Sogn og Fjordane) is a Norwegian museum consortium. It was established on January 14, 2009. It is a consolidation of the Coastal Museum in Sogn og Fjordane, the Sogn og Fjordane Art Museum, the Sunnfjord Museum, the Nordfjord Folk Museum, the Heiberg Collections—Sogn Folk Museum, the Norwegian Museum of Travel and Tourism, and the Millstone Park. The former owners of the individual museums have transferred professional, administrative, and financial responsibility to the new museum. The joint administration is located in Sandane. The director of the museum is Kjartan Aa Berge, and the chairman of the board is Ivar Kvalen.
