= The Norwegian Museum of Travel and Tourism =

Historic house museums in Norway

- Norsk Reiselivsmuseum
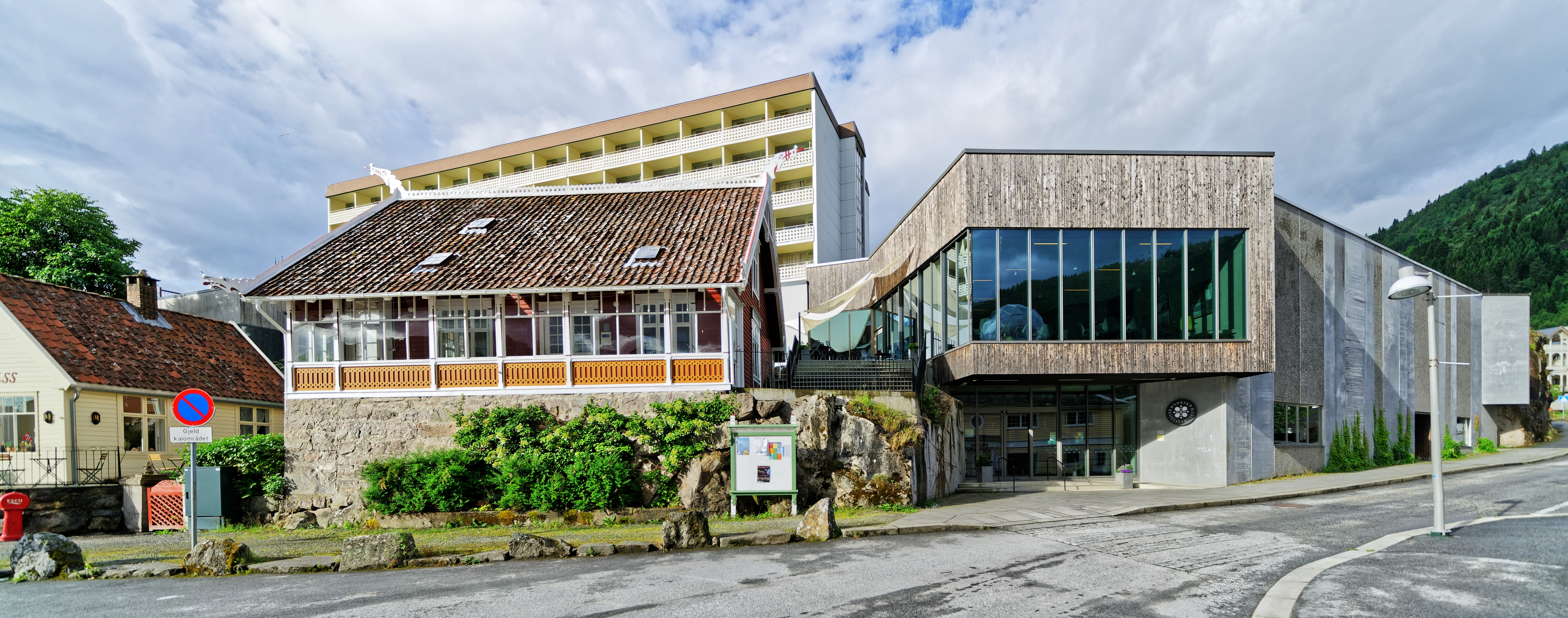
- Former name: The West Norwegian Tourist Museum
- Established: 1986/2001/2016
- Location: Balestrand, Sogndal Municipality, Vestland, Norway
- Coordinates: 61.21033°N 6.53642°E
- Website: reiselivsmuseum.no

The Norwegian Museum of Travel and Tourism is a museum located in the village of Balestrand which is located in Sogndal Municipality, Vestland county, Norway. The main aim of the museum is to exhibit the history of tourism in Norway from the beginning of the boom in the 19th century, and until today. It is a unit of Museums of Sogn og Fjordane.

== Current exhibitions (2016) ==
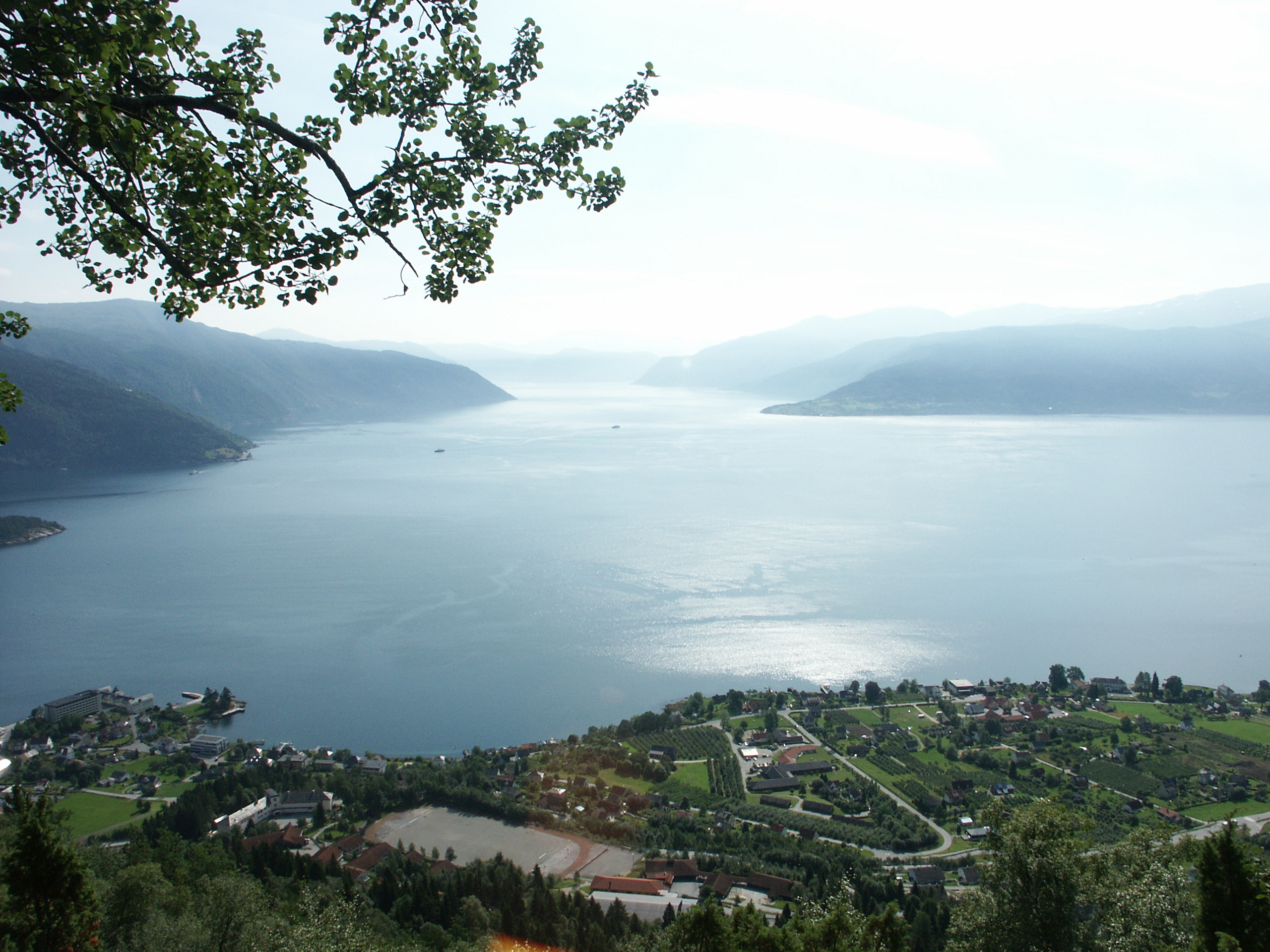
Balestrand as seen from the mountain

=== Tourism and Travel in Norway ===
A historical exhibition of the phenomenon of tourism in Norway since the 19th century. The exhibition makes frequent use of multi-media platforms to engage the spectator.

=== The Art colony in Balestrand ===
A historical exhibition about the Norwegian and international artists who came to Balestrand for inspiration, and thus contributed to the location's appeal as a tourist destination.

=== The Norwegian National Tourist Routes ===
This exhibition displays the National Tourist Routes with maps, pictures, movies, and sculptures.

A tour through the museum

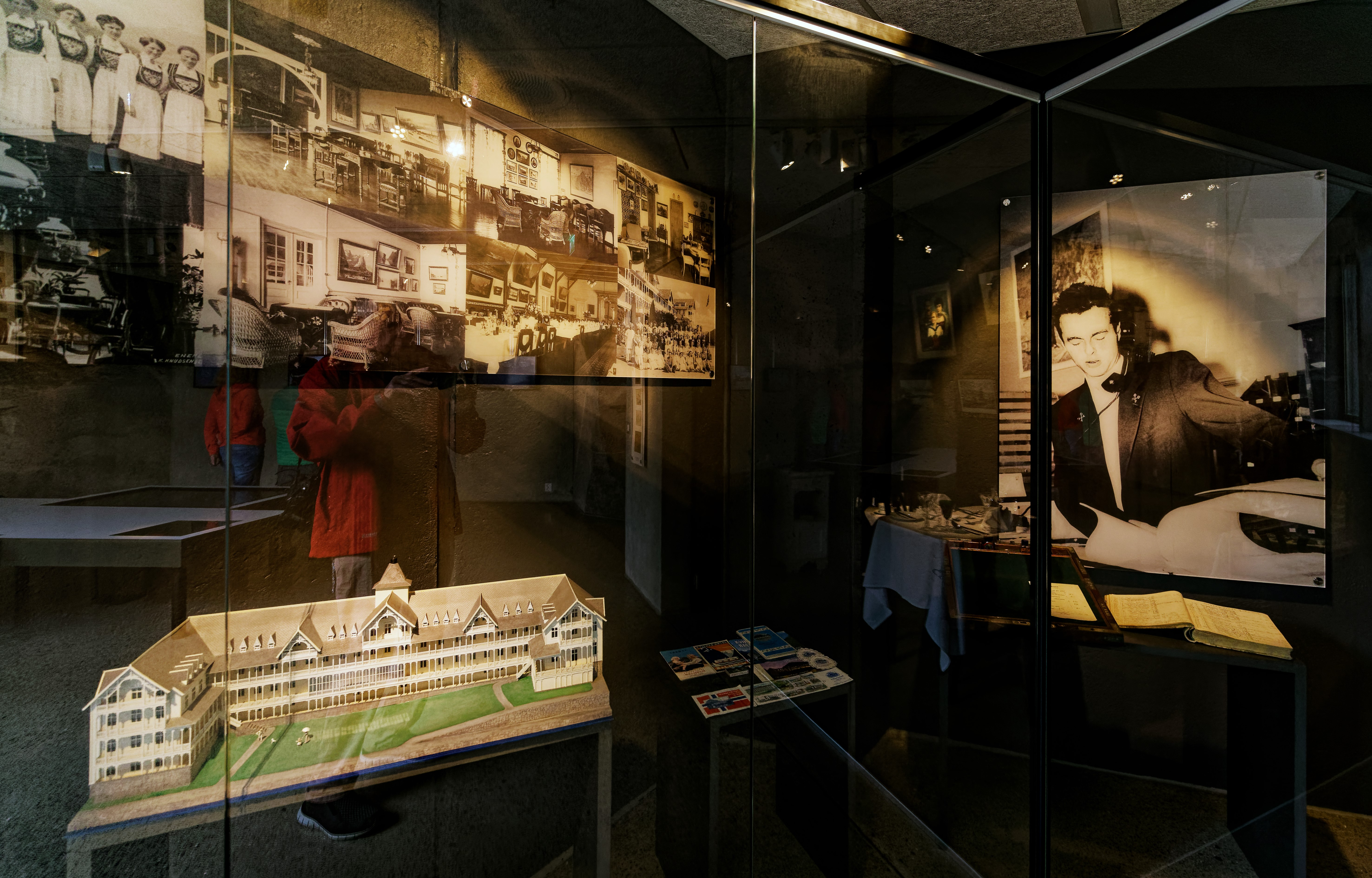

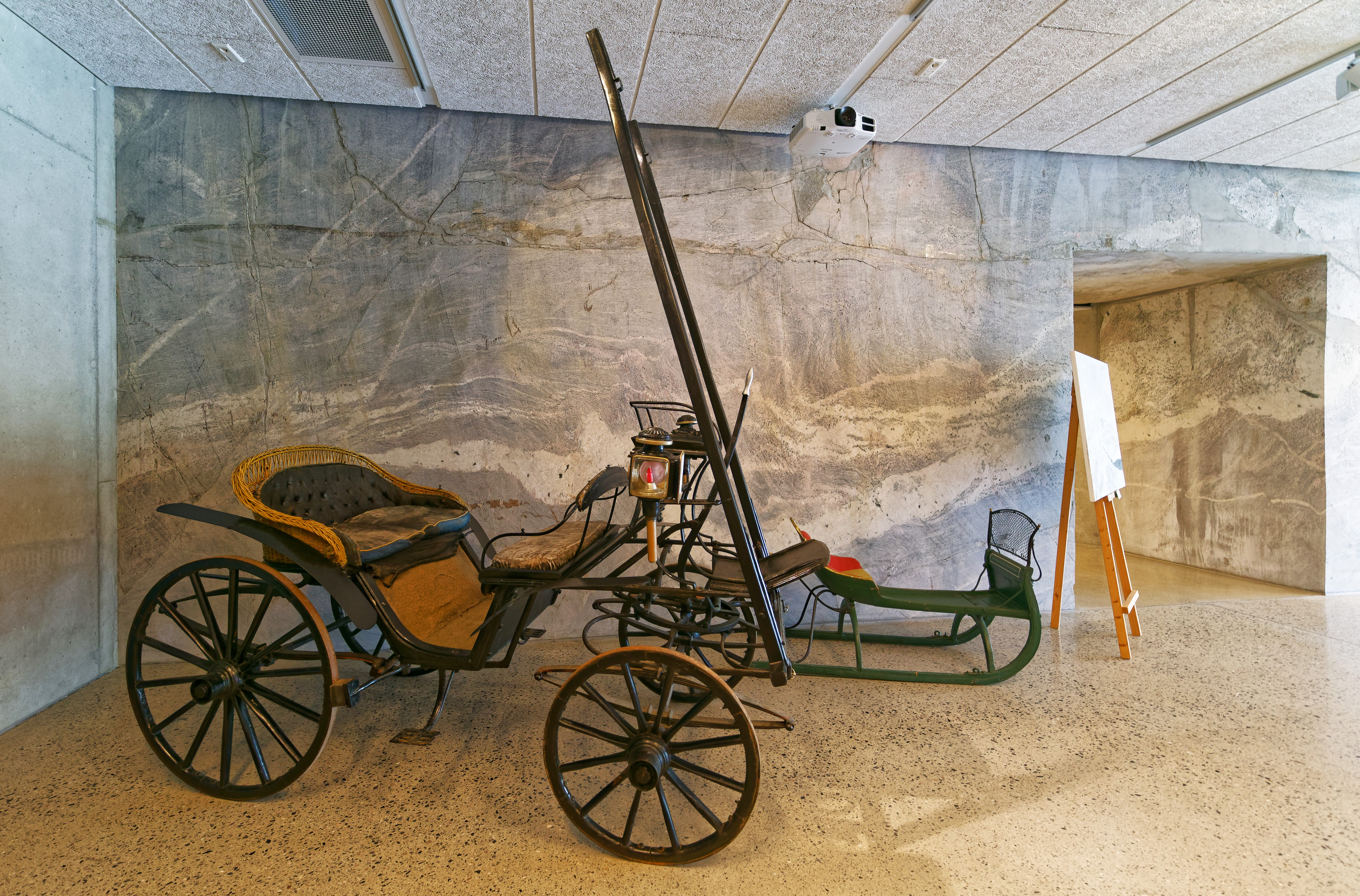

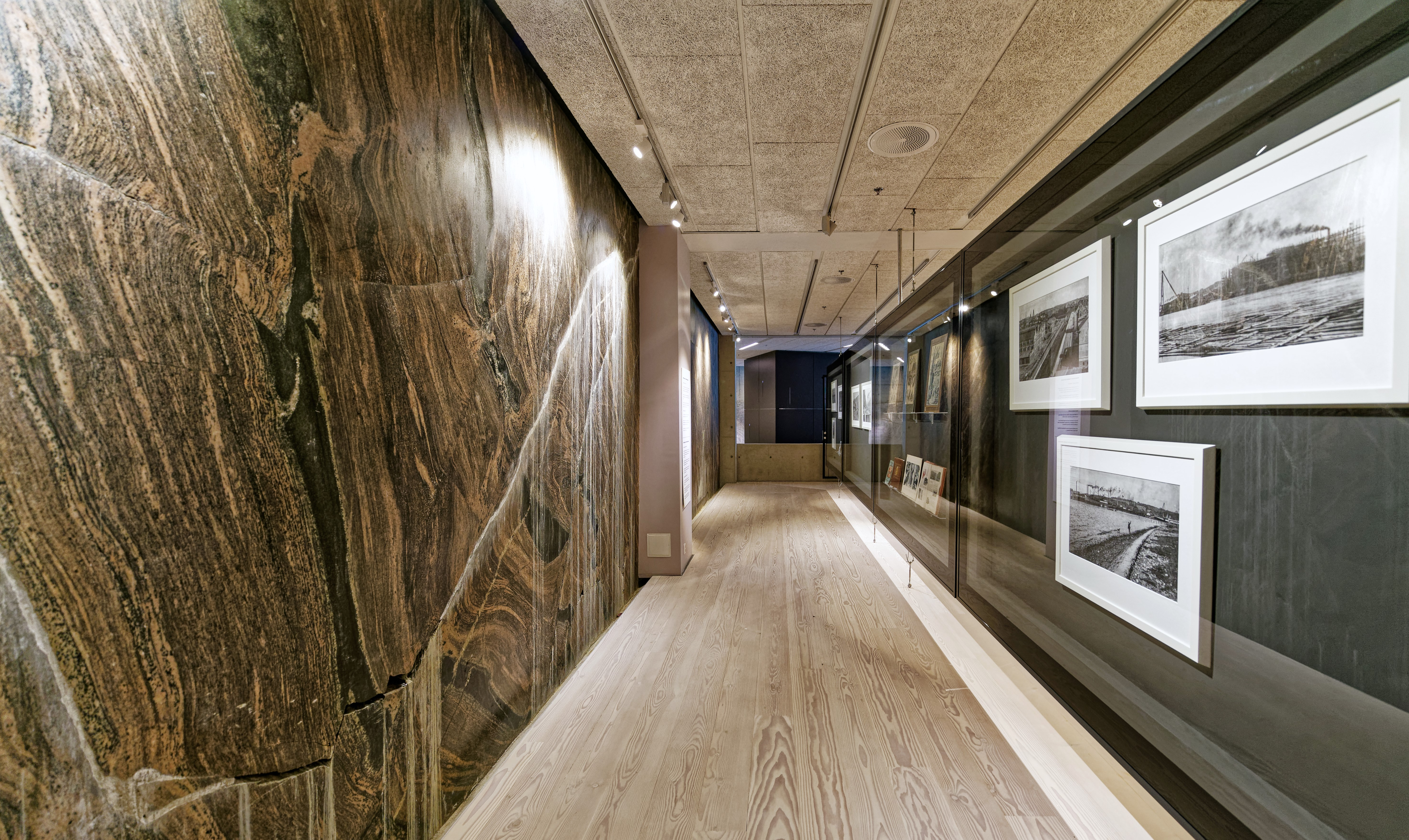

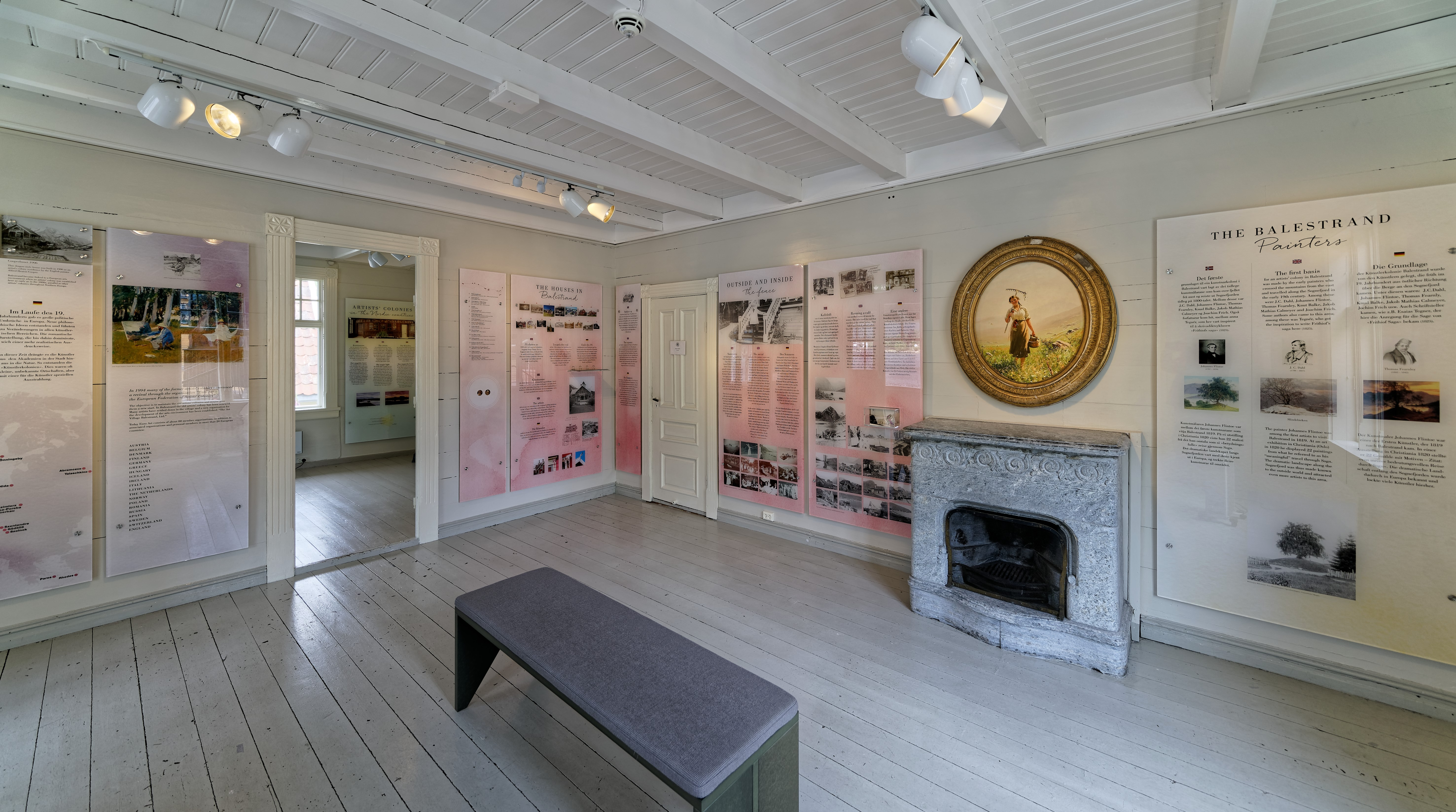

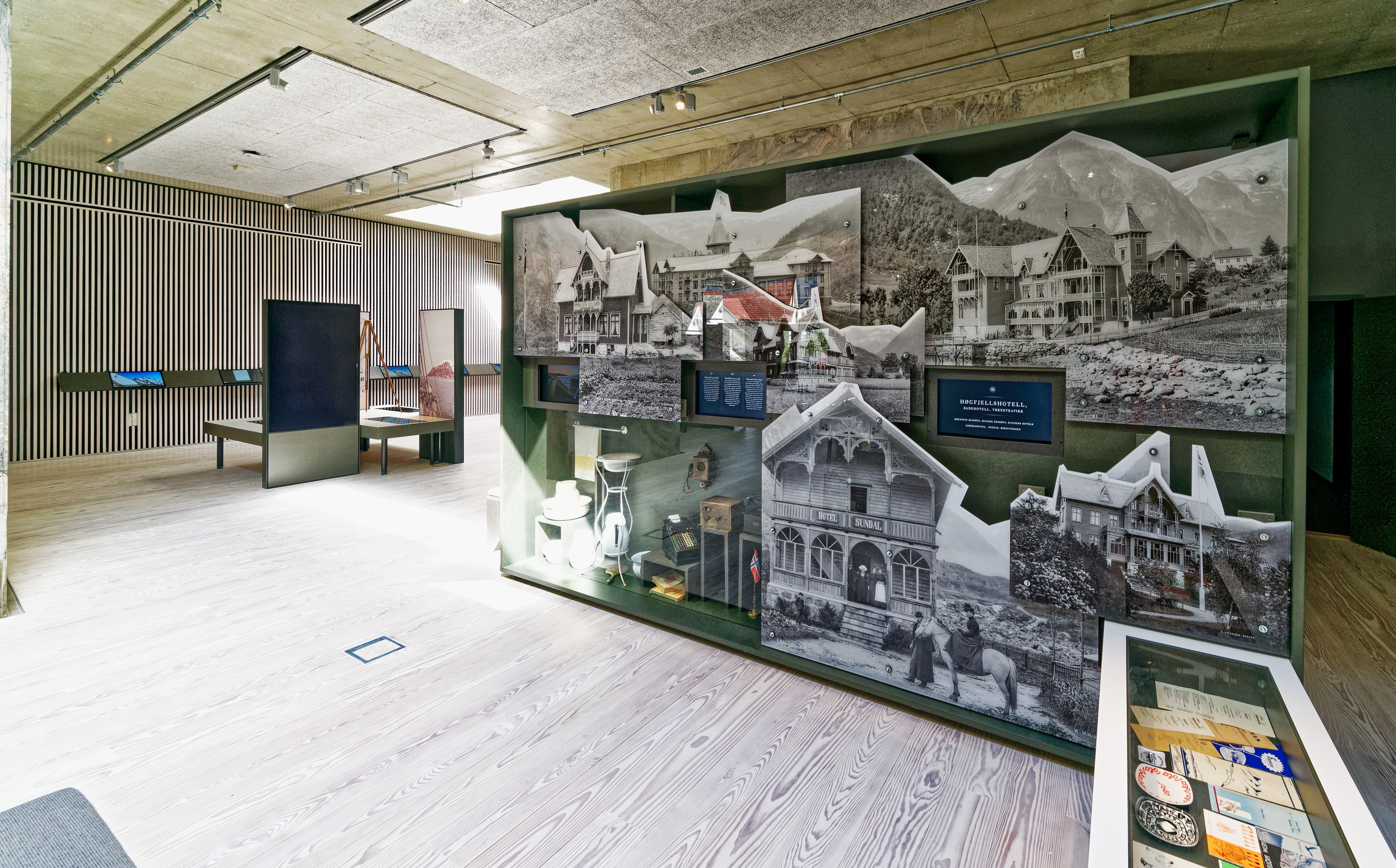

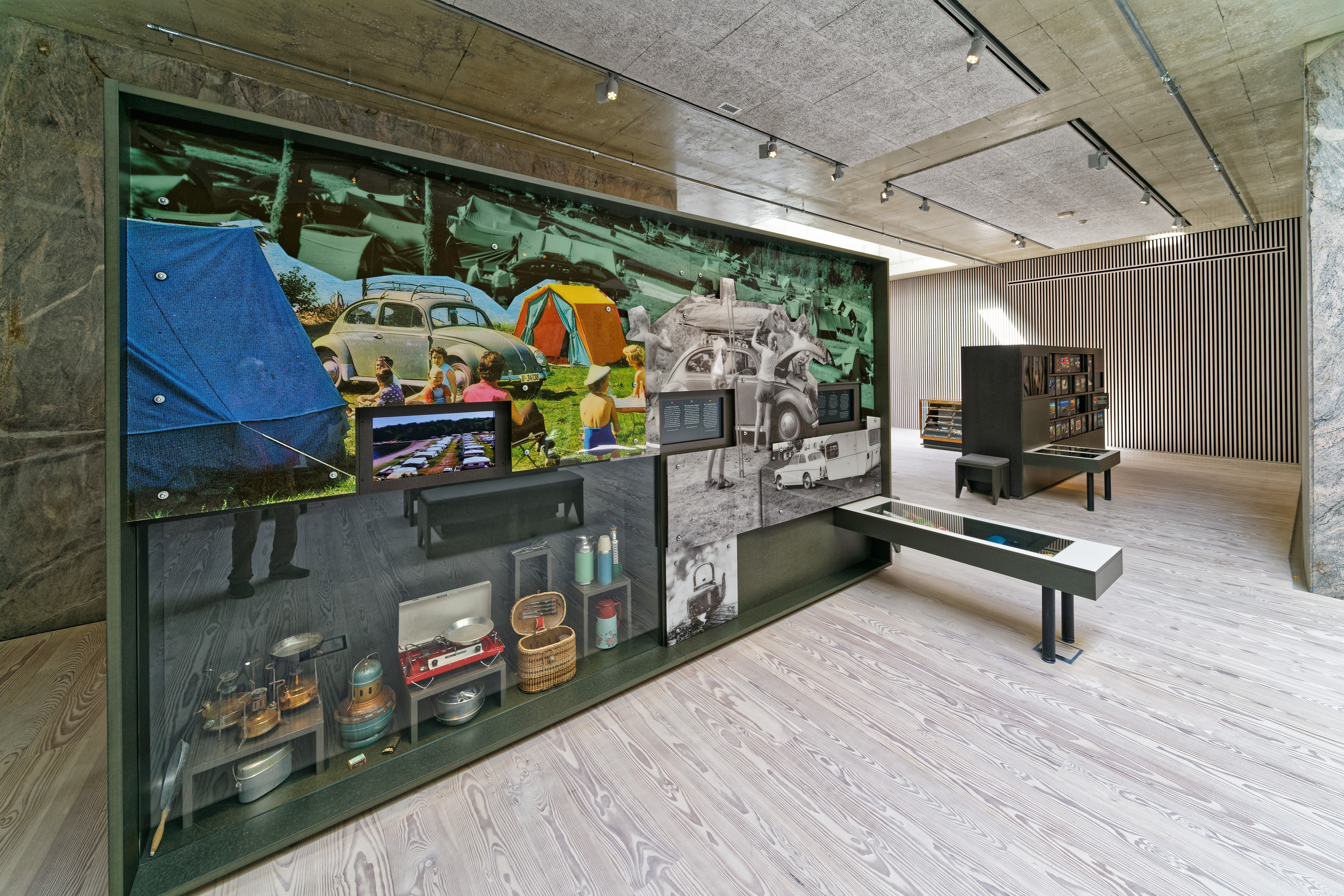

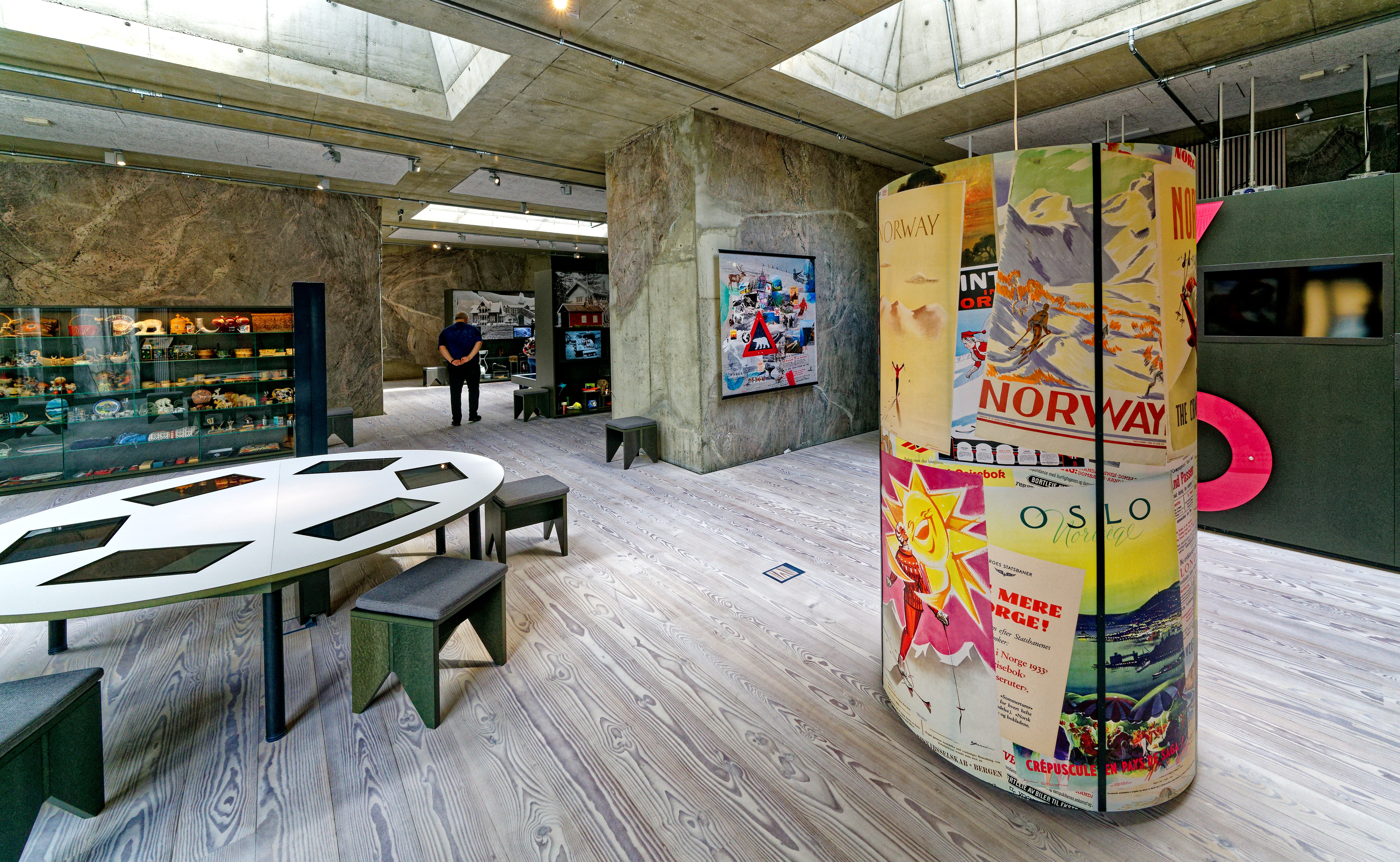

== History of the museum ==
Founded in 1986 as the Western Norwegian Museum of Travel and Tourism, the museum has consisted of several historic buildings on Balestrand pier since 1993. These have been the exhibition locales awaiting the opening of a dedicated museum building. Since 29 April 2016, the new building has been open to the public.
