= Frank Bjerkholt =

Frank Bjerkholt (17 November 1927 – 22 December 2013) was a Norwegian theologian, journalist and political non-fiction writer.

He was born in Sarpsborg as a son of Hans Bjerkholt, then a communist leader, and a mother who was active in the inner mission. Bjerkholt himself studied theology, graduating with the cand.theol. degree in 1954. Studies in the United States followed, with Bjerkholt writing a master's thesis on Reinhold Niebuhr. Both Bjerkholt and his father became active in Moral Re-Armament, a milieu where he also met his French wife. The couple resided in France for several years.

In 1966 he was hired as foreign affairs editor in Morgenbladet, resigning in 1988 over disagreements with the new owner Hroar Hansen. During this period he was also a correspondent for Le Monde from 1970 to 1980. In 1992 he was granted a lifelong government scholarship. He wrote extensively on Asian affairs, especially Vietnam; and European affairs, being active in the European Movement. Bjerkholt supported the South Vietnamese cause, facing widespread opposition in the public debate.

Bjerkholt was decorated with the French National Order of Merit and the Portuguese Order of Prince Henry. He died in December 2013.
