= Otto Christian Dahl =

Norwegian Christian missionary, linguist, and scholar (1903–1995)

Otto Christian Dahl (July 15, 1903 – November 11, 1995) was a Norwegian missionary in Madagascar, linguist, and government scholar.

Dahl was born in Namsos. He enrolled in theology studies in 1924, graduated in 1927, and was ordained the same year. He worked as a librarian for one year at the Stavanger Mission School before traveling to Madagascar in 1929 as a missionary for the Norwegian Missionary Society (NMS). He worked in Madagascar, with some interruptions, until 1957. He was the mission director for western Madagascar from 1952 to 1957, and president of the Malagasy Lutheran Church from 1955 to 1957. He was a teacher at Mission School from 1948 to 1949, and worked as a mission secretary for the NMS from 1958 to 1966.

Dahl studied linguistics in Oslo (1935–1937, 1947–1948, and 1950–1952), Hamburg (1937), and Leiden (1950). He received his doctorate from the University of Oslo in 1952 with the dissertation Malgache et maanjan: Une comparaison linguistique (Malagasy and Ma'anyan: A Linguistic Comparison). He was characterized as "probably the world's foremost expert on the Malagasy language." Dahl's work with the language and his comparison between Malagasy and Ma'anyan led him and others to advance the theory that Madagascar had been settled in approximately AD 400 by Ma'anyan-speaking people from the Tamianglayang area in southwestern Kalimantan (Borneo).

Dahl was given a government scholarship in 1967. He was named a "knight" of the National Order of Madagascar in 1979, an "officer" in 1984, a "commander" in 1989, and a "grand officer" in 1995. Dahl was also awarded the Norwegian King's Medal of Merit in gold. He was made a member of the Malagasy Academy 1941, and of the Norwegian Academy of Science and Letters in 1957.

Dahl had five children, one of whom is Øyvind Dahl, a missionary and professor at the Stavanger Mission School. Otto Christian Dahl died in Stavanger.

== Selected works by Dahl ==
- "Bibelen på Madagaskar" (The Bible in Madagascar, 1950)
- "De Zending op Madagaskar" (The Mission in Madagascar, 1950)
- Malgache et maanjan: Une comparaison linguistique (Malagasy and Ma'anyan: A Linguistic Comparison, dissertation, 1951)
- Les débuts de l'orthographe malgache (The Beginnings of Malagasy Spelling, 1966)
- Contes malgaches en dialecte sakalava (Malagasy Tales in the Sakalava Dialect, 1968)
- Misjonsarbeidet og folkets kulturelle tradisjoner: Et foredrag for misjonærer (Missionary Work and Cultural Traditions: A Lecture for Missionaries, 1969)
- Gassisk (Malagasy, 1970)
- Proto-Austronesian (1973, 1977)
- Atopazy ny masonao (Lift up Your Eyes, 1974)
- Early Phonetic and Phonemic Changes in Austronesian (1981)
- "Sorabe: revelant l'evolution du dialecte Antemoro" (Sorabe: Revealing the Evolution of the Antemoro Dialect, 1983)
- "Norske misjonærers innsats i vitenskapelig arbeid" (Norwegian Missionaries' Research Efforts, 1984)
- "Mahomet dans le panthéon Malgache" (Muhammad in the Malagasy Pantheon, 1984)
- "Focus in Malagasy and Proto-Austronesian" (1986)
- En dør mellom tanker: misjon og språk (A Door between Thoughts: Mission and Language, 1987)
- "Bantu Substratum in Malagasy" (1988)
- Norsklærer for folk med annet morsmål (Norwegian for Speakers of Other Languages, 1990)
- "Migration from Kalimantan to Madagascar" (1991)
- Kulturminner: døde levninger eller levende minner? (Cultural Heritage: Dead Remnants or Living Memories?, 2001)
