= Lorens Berg Foundation =

Norwegian history foundation

The Lorens Berg Foundation (Norwegian: Lorens Berg-stiftelsen) is a local history foundation in the former Andebu Municipality in Vestfold county, Norway.

The foundation's purpose is to stimulate local historical work in Andebu and Vestfold. In addition, the foundation is responsible for publishing a new local history book for Andebu, operating a local history center, and running a web portal for local historical work in Andebu.

The foundation was established by the Andebu Historical Association (Norwegian: Andebu fortidslag), the municipality of Andebu, Andebu Sparebank, and the Andebu fire insurance company.

The foundation is named after the local historian and the local history book author Lorens Berg. The foundation was established in 2008.
