= Hans Bjerkholt =

Norwegian trade unionist and activist

Hans Bjerkholt (23 November 1892 – 15 March 1983) was a Norwegian trade unionist and activist in the Communist Party, later Moral Re-Armament.

As a labourer in Skjeberg, he was among the founders of the Communist Party of Norway. He fielded for parliamentary election several times in the constituency Østfold; as second ballot candidate in 1924, first candidate in 1930, first candidate in 1933, second candidate in 1945, and first candidate again in 1949. He worked as secretary of Østfold faglige samorg.

In the summer of 1950 he visited Caux, the headquarters of Moral Re-Armament. Some time after that, Bjerkholt started adhering to MRA's ideas. According to many in the Communist Party, this was incompatible with Marxism. Bjerkholt publicly parted ways with the Communist Party, the news reaching national media.

His wife was active in the inner mission, and his son Frank Bjerkholt followed in their footsteps, graduating in theology, but also working as foreign affairs editor in Morgenbladet. Hans Bjerkholt died in 1983.
