= Hans Kristian Eriksen =

- Born: 2 April 1933; Kiberg, Norway
- Died: 8 June 2014 (aged 81)
- Occupation(s): non-fiction writer, magazine editor, novelist and short story writer
- Awards: King's Medal of Merit in gold (1996)

Hans Kristian Eriksen (2 April 1933 – 8 June 2014) was a Norwegian non-fiction writer, magazine editor, novelist and short story writer.

== Personal life ==
Eriksen was born in Kiberg to fisherman Reidar Kristoffer Eriksen and Elida Helene Malin. He married Erna Stangnes in 1954.

== Career ==
Eriksen worked as schoolteacher and principal on the island of Senja from 1954 to 1978, when he became a full-time writer and editor, from 1992 as a government scholar. Among his early books are Der laks leker – og fugl flyr from 1970, Sangsvanedalen from 1971, Gamle Tranøy from 1972, and Vandrere i grenseland from 1973. He wrote several historical books on the Second World War, including Partisaner i Finnmark from 1969, Partisanenes død from 1972, and Barnet og krigen from 1983. He edited the annual Årbok for Senja from 1972 to 1992, and the magazine Nordnorsk Magasin from 1978 to 1999. He edited the three-volume series Nordnorsk dikting (1984–1989). He was elected to the County council of Troms for the periods 1975–1979 and 1992–1995. He received the cultural prize from the county municipality of Troms in 1979, and the cultural prize from the city of Tromsø in 1980. In 1996 he was awarded the King's Medal of Merit in gold.
