= Silentium =

Finnish gothic metal band

- Origin: Jämsänkoski, Finland
- Genres: Gothic metal
- Years active: 1995–present
- Labels: Spikefarm; Dynamic Arts Records; Out of Line music
- Members: Juha Lehtioksa; Matti Aikio; Sami Boman; Riina Rinkinen; Janne Ojala; Aapeli Kivimäki

Silentium is a Finnish gothic metal band. The band was formed in 1995 and it originates from Jämsänkoski, Finland. Keyboardist Sami Boman and original vocalist Matti Aikio created Silentium by adding violin player Jani Laaksonen, guitar players Toni Lahtinen and Juha Lehtioksa, and drummer Jari Ojala into the line-up of their previous band Funeral.

== History ==
Silentium consists of former members of Finnish death/gothic metal band Funeral, which disbanded in December 1995. The new band was founded by keyboardist Sami Boman and vocalist Matti Aikio, inviting violin player Jani Laaksonen, guitar players Toni Lahtinen and Juha Lehtioksa, as well as drummer Jari Ojala. Silentium's first recording was the four-song EP "Illacrimó" which was released at the end of 1996. "Caméne Misera" became their second EP released in 1998 featuring vocals by Tiina Lehvonen who then joined the band permanently. "Caméne Misera" come to attention of Thy Serpent guitarist, Sami Tenetz, who at the time has been setting up his record label Spikefarm, and invited Silentium signed a deal with Spikefarm. In 1999 they released "Infinita Plango Vulnera", recorded with the new drummer Janne Ojala and becoming Spikefarm's first CD.

Their third full-length album "Sufferion - Hamartia of Prudence" was recorded in Walltone studios of Savonlinna, Finland in January 2003, and produced by Tuomas Holopainen. During the production, vocalist Tiina Lehvonen "took a time-out from Silentium for personal reasons", substituted by Tanya (AKA "ms Whisper Lilith") and Maija Turunen. "Sufferion" was mixed in February 2003 by Walltone's staff engineers Tuomo Valtonen and Tuomas Holopainen. Mika Jussila then put the finishing touches at Finnvox studios.

The addition of singer Riina Rinkinen to the band in 2006 was welcomed by Canadian and German reviewers. Both Seducia (2006) Amortean (2009) were released on Dynamic Arts Records.

== Style ==
Silentium described themselves as a melodic metal band.

== Members ==
=== Current members ===
- Juha Lehtioksa - guitars (1995–present)
- Sami Boman - keyboards, add. brass samples, backing vocals (1995–present)
- Riina Rinkinen - female vocals (2004–present)
- Janne Ojala - drums (1999–2004, 2014–present)
- Aapeli Kivimäki - guitars (2014–present)
- Ville Koskinen - bass (2019–present)

=== Former Members ===
- Matti Aikio - bass, male vocals (1995–2018; died 2022)
- Jari Ojala - drums (1995–1999, 2004–2014)
- Toni Lahtinen - guitars (1995–2014)
- Jani Laaksonen - violin (1995–2004)
- Tiina Lehvonen - female vocals (1998–2004)
- Elias Kahila - cello (2005-2007)

Timeline

== Discography ==
=== Albums and EPs ===
- Illacrimó (EP, 1996)
- Caméne Misera (EP, 1998)
- Infinita Plango Vulnera (1999)
- SI.VM E.T A.V.VM (2001)
- Altum (2001)
- Sufferion - Hamartia of Prudence (2003)
- Seducia (2006)
- Amortean (2008)
- Motiva (2020)

=== Singles ===
- "Frostnight" (2005)
- "Dead Silent" (2007)
