= Paul Fjellboe =

Norwegian-American painter

- Born: Paulmar Thorsten Jansen; August 11, 1873; Odal, Norway
- Died: June 9, 1948 (aged 74); Salt Lake City, Utah, U.S.
- Resting place: Salt Lake City Cemetery
- Occupations: Painter, violinist

Paul Fjellboe (August 11, 1873 – June 9, 1948) was a Norwegian-born American painter and violinist.

== Life ==
Fjellboe was born as Paulmar Thorsten Jansen on August 11, 1873, in Odal, Norway. He emigrated to the United States in 1905, at age 32.

Fjellboe became an oil painter in Salt Lake City, where he had a studio on Main Street. His work was exhibited in New York City and Washington, D.C. He was also a violinist with the Norwegian choir in Salt Lake City.

Fjellboe was a member of the Church of Jesus Christ of Latter-day Saints. He died on June 9, 1948, in Salt Lake City, and he was buried in the Salt Lake City Cemetery. His work can be seen at the Springville Museum of Art.
