= Idar Handagard =

Norwegian physician and botanist (1874–1959)

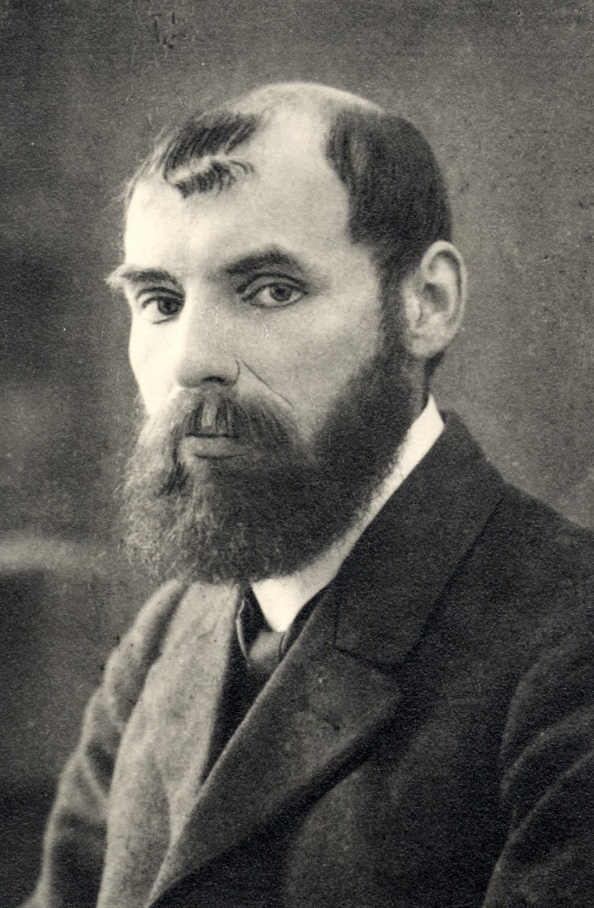
- Born: August 9, 1874; Kristiansund, Norway
- Died: December 11, 1959 (aged 85)
- Occupations: Physician, botanist, author, and government scholar

Idar Handagard (August 9, 1874 – December 11, 1959) was a Norwegian physician, botanist, Nynorsk campaigner, temperance activist, and government scholar.

Handagard was born in Kristiansund and grew up there and in Bergen. He received a medical degree (cand.med.) in 1905, and in 1907 he received the King's Medal of Merit in gold for a thesis on Norwegian plant names. In the same year, he also received a prize for the first Nynorsk textbook on health education, Mannalikamen og helsa. The book was later republished in many editions.

Handagard's writing and engagement included the Norwegian Landsmål movement (Norwegian: målrørsla), the temperance movement, and a left-wing stance on several social issues. When the Norwegian Writers' Association was founded in 1910, he was elected the association's first chairman. He both admired and wrote about Oscar Nissen, who was leader of both the Norwegian Total Abstinence Society (Norwegian: Det norske Totalavholdsselskap) and the Labor Party.

He never practiced as a physician, but was an active and persistent writer, and he wrote more than 50 books and pamphlets, including Doktorboki (1913) and Vanlege dykdouk (1925), became involved in the Greenland case, and wrote several short biographies of poets in the series Småskrifter for bokvenner about Ivar Aasen, Kristofer Janson, Johan Herman Wessel, and Henrik Wergeland. He also wrote many collections of poems, and several of his poems were set to music. Handagard was long and actively involved in the temperance movement, including through the Student Temperance Association (Norwegian: Studentavholdslaget) in Oslo. His motivation was based on Christian ethics, as well as public and medical grounds. He wrote several articles on the history and pioneers of the temperance movement. Handagard became a government scholar in 1932.

== Works ==
- Det gamle og det nye aar: nytaarsfantasi i en akt, 1897
- Under blaat flag: sange og tendens-digte, 1900
- "Fosna-maale: eit norskt bymaal," in: Syn og Segn, 1901
- Sange sub rosa og andre digte, 1902
- Mannalikamen og helsa, 1907
- Saftbogen: en veiledning for husmødre, 1912
- Doktarboki: ei rettleiding fyr folket, 1913
- Det nye samfund, 1914
- En samfunds-idé og dens digtere, 1915; vol. 1: Wergeland og Welhaven og deres stilling til ædruelighetsarbeide, vol 2: Fem folkedigtere: John Dahl, Ole Sneve, Waldemar Ager, Augusta Abrahamsen, Mauritz Sterner
- Turrmanns visor og andre vers, 1921
- Folkesuveræniteten og Grønlandsspørgsmaalet, 1922
- Vanlege sjukdomar, 1925
- Norsk verslæra, 1932
- Danmarks urett og Noregs rett til Grønland, 1932
- Victor Hugo. Dei bannstøytte (Les Misérables), translated by Idar Handagard, 1933
- Nye songar og nye salmor, 1938
- Rytme og rim: Stutt verslæra: Med ei rytmetavla, 1944
