= Arne Odd Johnsen =

Norwegian medieval and economic historian

Arne Odd Johnsen (3 December 1909 – 9 July 1985) was a Norwegian medieval and economic historian.

== Early career ==
He was born in Asker as the son of historian Oscar Albert Johnsen (1876–1954) and Anna Evie Tollefsen (1877–1944). He finished his secondary education in 1928, enrolled in philology at the University of Oslo and graduated in 1936 with the mag.art. degree. Between 1937 and 1939 he studied medieval history at École des Chartes, Sorbonne and Collège de France. He was then a research fellow at the University of Oslo for five years. In 1945 he published his thesis Studier vedrørende kardinal Nicolaus Brekespears legasjon til Norden, about Cardinal Nicolas Breakspear, later known as Pope Adrian IV. The thesis earned him the dr.philos. degree in 1946.

== Later career ==
After taking his doctorate he held scholarships and fellowships at several institutions in Norway and abroad. He was a member of the Norwegian Academy of Science and Letters from 1949 and the Royal Norwegian Society of Sciences and Letters from 1953. In 1958 he received a permanent scholarship from the Norwegian state. Johnsen became known for his endeavor to publish source documents from medieval and early modern times. His largest single work was Finnmarksfangstens historie 1864–1905, published in 1959 as volume one of Den moderne hvalfangst historie, the history of modern whaling. He was the editor of Kristiansunds historie, a work on the history of Kristiansund, published in five volumes between 1945 and 1962, and in 1971 he released Tønsberg gjennom tidene on the history of Tønsberg.

Johnsen also issued one collection of poetry, in 1930 under the pseudonym Tore Tallbo. He married interior decorator Birgitte Christine Paus (1915–1992) in 1952. He died in July 1985 in Oslo.
