= Coastal Museum in Sogn og Fjordane =

- Kystmuseet i Sogn og Fjordane
- Location within Vestland
- Established: 1980
- Location: Florø, Norway
- Coordinates: 61°35′21″N 5°2′33″E
- Type: Folk museum
- Website: https://www.kyst.museum.no/

The Coastal Museum in Sogn og Fjordane (Norwegian: Kystmuseet i Sogn og Fjordane) is a cultural history museum located in Florø, Norway.

The museum was established in 1980 and is a division of Museums of Sogn og Fjordane. The museum presents the natural and cultural conditions along the coast in the past and present. Its main buildings are located in a 7.4-hectare (18-acre) museum and recreation area, and consist of a typical fisherman's home, an exhibition on the development of the village of Florø, and a large boat collection, which includes the Bakkejekta, a traditional mid-18th century sloop known as a jekt that was used as a coastal freighter. There are plans to develop an area presenting the settlements from the outer islands and along the fjord. The museum also has a large exhibition called Snorre-ankeret that presents the oil business in the North Sea, focusing on the newly created Snorre oil field. The museum also has smaller facilities in Gulen and Selje.
