= Lorens Berg =

Norwegian teacher and historian (1862–1924)

- Born: January 18, 1862; Kodal, Norway
- Died: September 14, 1924 (aged 62); Kristiania, Norway
- Occupations: Teacher, historian

Lorens Berg (January 18, 1862 – September 14, 1924) was a Norwegian teacher and local historian.

== Life ==
Berg was born in Kodal, the son of Amund Andersen (1827–1868) and Anne Kristine Sørensdatter (1822–1870). He worked as a shepherd and farmhand as a child, and then as a sailor before becoming a teacher in 1881. He taught at Prestbyen in Kodal from 1891 to 1899.

In 1905 Berg published the book Andebu. En Vestfold-bygds historie i 1600-aarene (Andebu: History of a Vestfold Village in the 1600s). He thereby started a practice of local history writing that became a pioneer in Norway, based on archival studies and a solid methodical presentation. In less than 20 years he published local history books (bygdebøker) about Brunlanes, Hedrum, Tjølling, Sandar, Tjøme, Nøtterøy, and Stokke.

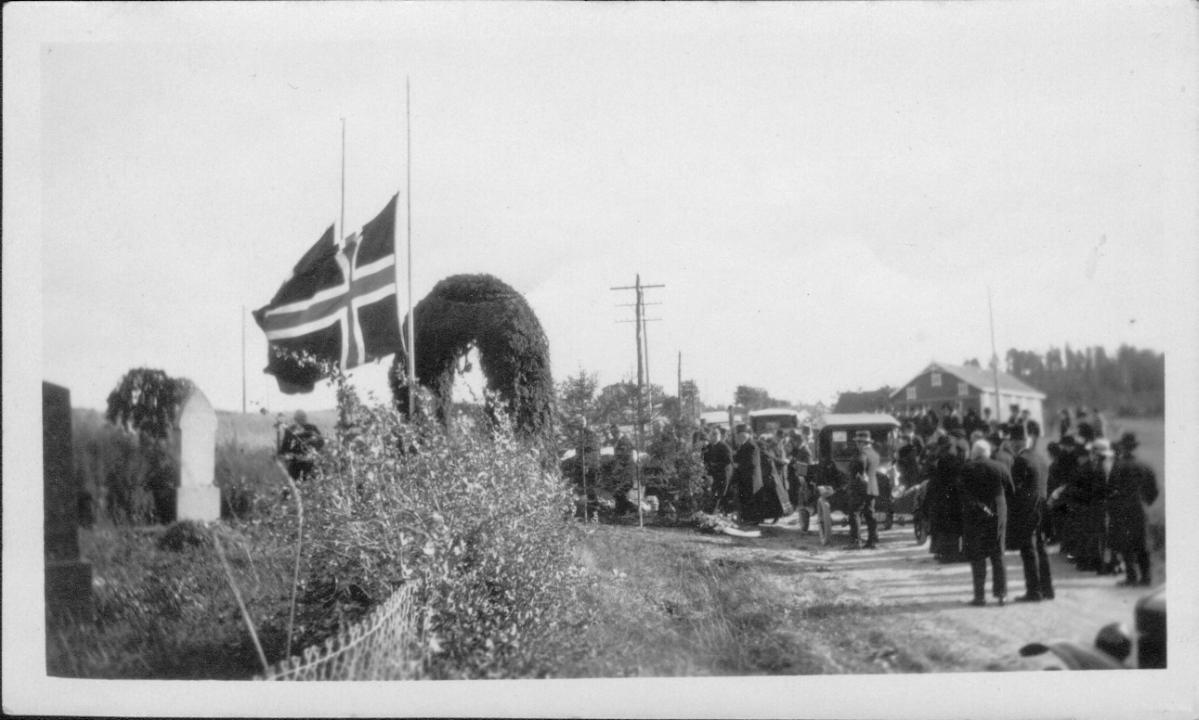
Lorens Berg's funeral on September 19, 1924, at Kodal Church

Berg was appointed a government scholar in 1911. He died in Kristiania (now Oslo) on September 14, 1924. He was buried in the Kodal cemetery on September 19, 1924, where there is a memorial next to his grave. In 1952, a granite statue of Berg by Hans Holmen was unveiled at Prestbyen in Kodal. In 2008, a local historical society, the Lorens Berg Foundation, was established in Andebu.

== Publications ==
- 1905: Andebu. En Vestfold-bygds historie i 1600-aarene (Andebu: History of a Vestfold Village in the 1600s). Kristiania: Det Mallingske Bogtrykkeri.
- 1909: "Gaarden Aker i Sem. En Gaardshistorie" (The Aker Farm in Sem. A Rural History). Historisk tidsskrift 20: 232–251.
- 1909: "Om Jordegodsets Fordeling i Tønsberg Len (det senere Jarlsberg Grevskab) i 1650 og 1701" (Estate Division in Tønsberg County, Later Jarlsberg County, in 1650 and 1701). Historisk tidsskrift 20: 33–66.
- 1912: "Om bygdehistorie" (Village History). Historisk tidsskrift 22: 86–92.
