= Nordfjord Folk Museum =

- Nordfjord Folkemuseum
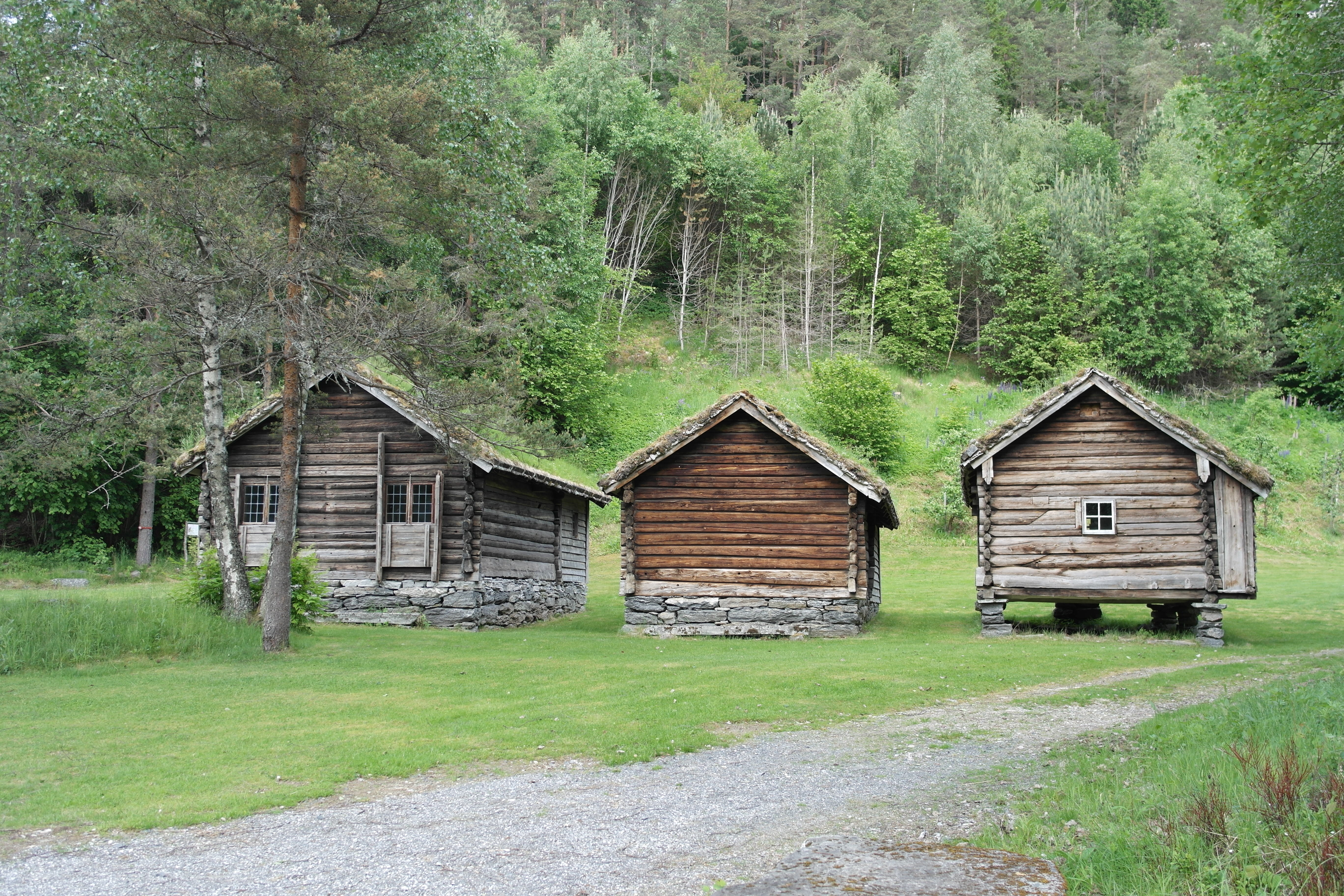

- Location within Vestland
- Established: 1920
- Location: Sandane, Norway
- Coordinates: 61°46′22″N 6°13′16″E
- Type: Folk museum
- Website: https://www.nordfjord.museum.no/

The Nordfjord Folk Museum (Norwegian: Nordfjord folkemuseum) is a regional museum for Nordfjord, Norway and is a division of Museums of Sogn og Fjordane. The museum is located in the Jølet area of Sandane in Gloppen Municipality.

== Holdings ==
The museum's collection includes 45 old buildings from the 17th, 18th, and 19th centuries. These include cottages and storehouses, an outdoor kitchen, barns and stables, a stall and milking building, a doghouse, a chicken coop, a school room, and a dye-house. The museum has approximately 25,000 items from the outer coastal settlements to the innermost agricultural settlements in Nordfjord. The museum covers hydropower in Sogn and Fjordane, and functioning rotary mills, stamping mills, sawmills, and water wheel houses are located along a river connected to ponds and streams. In the administration and exhibition building there are permanent and changing exhibitions, a museum shop, and a café.

== Events ==
The rock festival Glopperock has regularly been held at the open-air museum.

== History ==
The Nordfjord Folk Museum was founded by the Nordfjord Historical Society (Nordfjord Sogelag) in 1920. It was first located in Åsen just outside of Sandane before the museum was relocated to Jølet in 1960. In 1995, a new fireproof building was opened at a cost of approximately NOK 20 million and a total area of approximately 1,800 square meters (19,000 sq ft). This building houses the museum's administration and indoor exhibition premises. In 2009, the Nordfjord Folk Museum became part of the Museums of Sogn and Fjordane Foundation (Stiftinga Musea i Sogn og Fjordane, MISF), which is the consolidated museum for Sogn and Fjordane. The former owners of the museums have transferred professional, administrative, and financial responsibility to the new museum.

== Directors ==
The Nordfjord Folk Museum has been headed by:

- Aslaug Nesje Bjørlo (from 1995 to 2016)
- Anne Kristin Moe (since 2016)
