= Matti Aikio =

Norwegian poet and writer

Matti Aikio (Northern Sami: Luhkkár Máhte Máhtte born Mathis Isaksen; 18 June 1872 in Karasjok – 25 July 1929 in Oslo) was a Norwegian Sami writer. He was one of the first Sami writers in Norway. Due to his excellent performance at the county school in Vadsø he got one of the two seats that were reserved for Sami people at the teacher seminary in Tromsø in 1890. This was his first encounter with the Norwegian language.

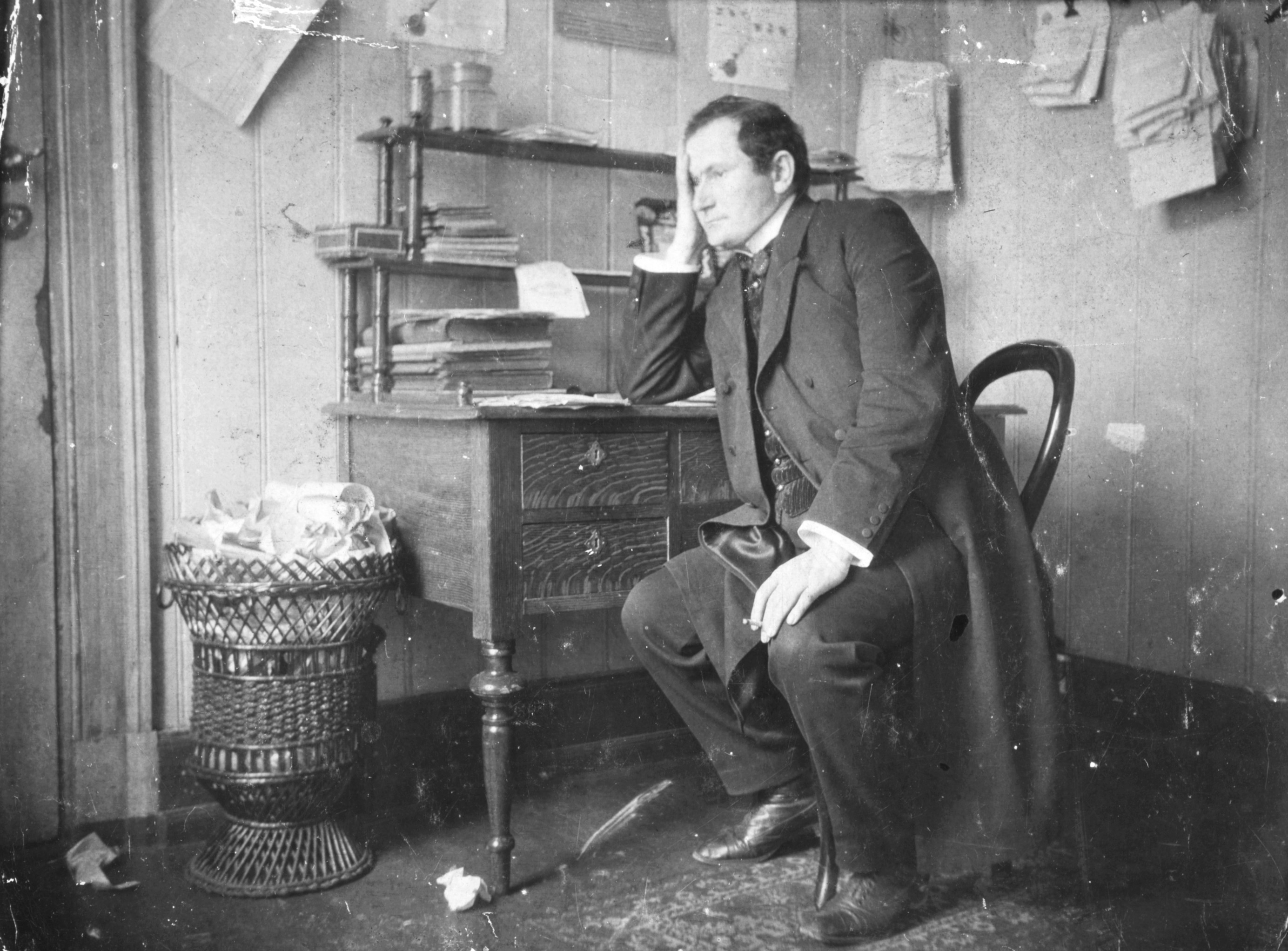
Matti Aikio, was a Norwegian Sami writer.
