= Local history book =

A local history book (also known as a (rural) farm book or local chronicle; Norwegian: bygdebok), is a Norwegian publication genre describing the history and population of one or more rural settlements. Many local history books feature a short history of each farm and a chronology of its owners dating back several generations or centuries. Norwegian local history books have usually been published under the auspices of or in collaboration with the municipality.

Such local history books began being published in Norway around 1910 starting with the work of Lorens Berg, but one can trace the roots of the phenomenon back to the topographic literature of the Enlightenment.

Local history books can be divided into three main categories, and many local history books contain volumes of several types:

- General rural and cultural history;
- Topic-based rural history with chapters on building practices, geology, dialects, school, churches, and the like; and
- Farm history and genealogy history, where the village is described based on the properties. For each farm, information is provided on its name, property tax, operating statistics, inheritance, division, and ownership or user change. In addition, with some variation, information about the inhabitants from historical archives (from the 15th or 16th century) is often presented by family based on the owner or user of the property. As a rule, a very brief presentation of individual biographies follows. It is common to list years of birth and death, years of marriages, spouses, and possibly destinations of emigration. The oldest local history books only presented farm owners, whereas newer local history books describe entire families and also crofters, tenants, and the homeless.

== See also ==
- One-place study
